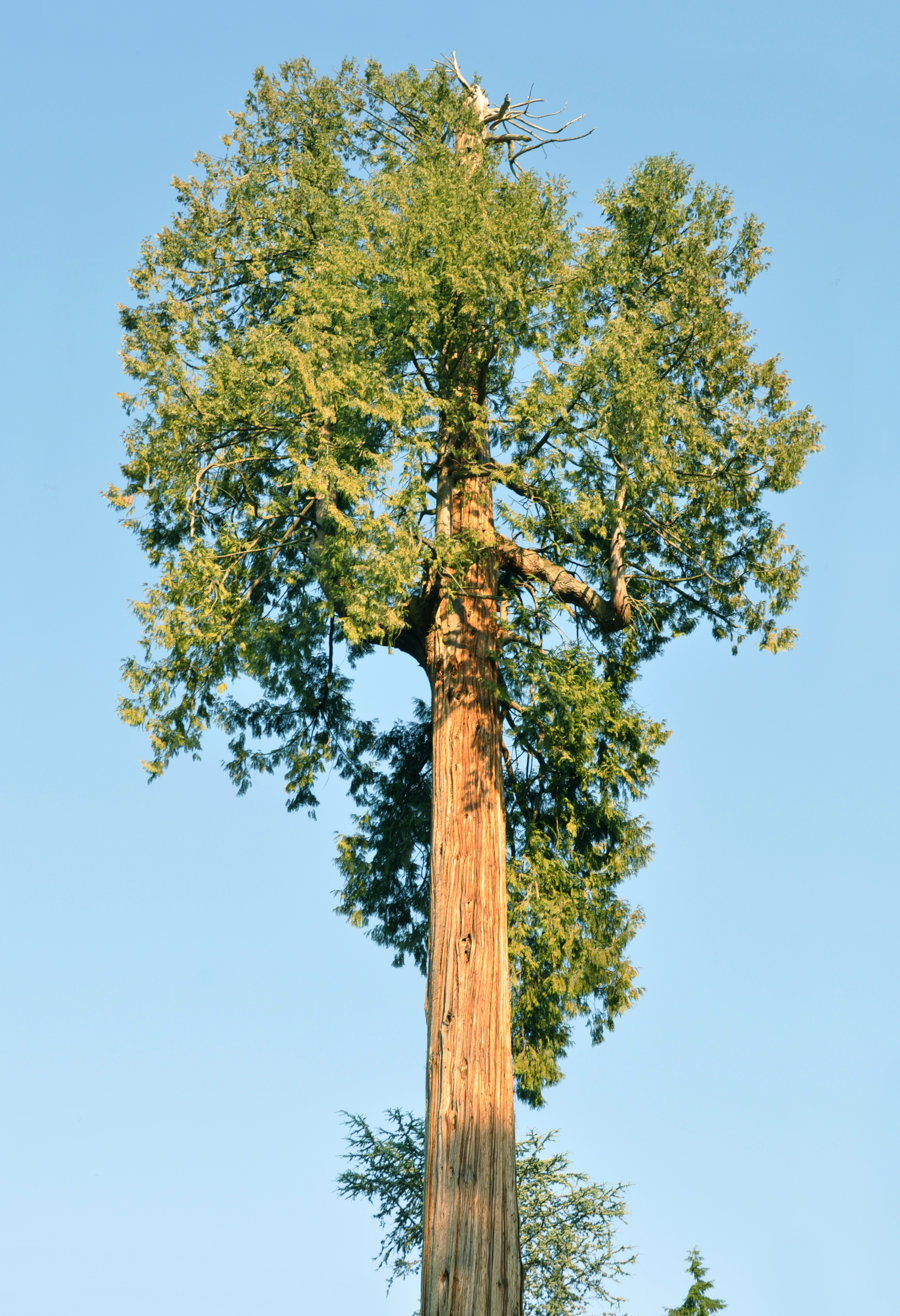
- An old tree in Vancouver

Conservation status
- Least Concern (IUCN 3.1)

Scientific classification
- Kingdom: Plantae
- Clade: Tracheophytes
- Clade: Gymnosperms
- Division: Pinophyta
- Class: Pinopsida
- Order: Cupressales
- Family: Cupressaceae
- Genus: Thuja
- Species: T. plicata

Binomial name
- Thuja plicata Donn ex D.Don
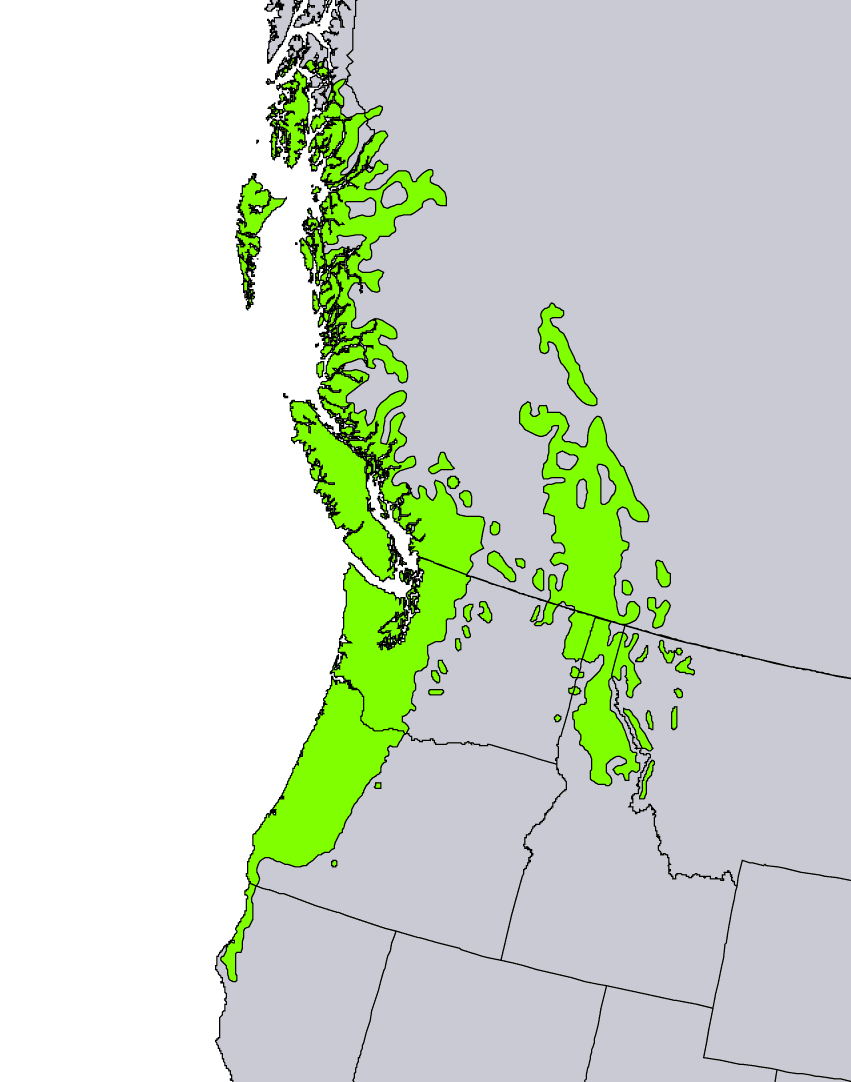
- Range of T. plicata in the Pacific Northwest

= Thuja plicata =

Species of conifer

Thuja plicata is a large coniferous tree in the cypress family, Cupressaceae, native to the Pacific Northwest of North America. Its common name is western redcedar, although it is not a true cedar. It is often spelled western red cedar in the Pacific Northwest, and is sometimes known as pacific red cedar, giant arborvitae, western arborvitae, just cedar, giant cedar, or shinglewood. T. plicata is the largest species in the genus Thuja, growing up to 70 metres (230 ft) tall and 7 m (23 ft) in diameter. It mostly grows in areas that experience a mild climate with plentiful rainfall, although it is sometimes present in drier areas on sites where water is available year-round, such as wet valley bottoms and mountain streamsides. The species is shade-tolerant and able to establish in forest understories and is thus considered a climax species. It is a very long-lived tree, with some specimens reaching ages of well over 1,000 years.

Indigenous peoples of the Pacific Northwest use the wood of this species for many purposes, such as building canoes, totem poles, and tools. The bark is harvested by indigenous peoples and processed into a fiber, which they use to make items such as rope, baskets, clothing, and rain hats. Because of its wide range of uses, the species is of great cultural importance to these people. Western redcedar wood is aromatic and rot-resistant and is used for applications such as the construction of shingles and siding. It has been introduced to cool temperate areas in other parts of the world, such as Northern Europe and New Zealand.

== Description ==
Thuja plicata is a large to very large tree, ranging up to 45 to 70 metres (150 to 230 feet) tall and 2.4 to 7 m (8 to 23 ft) in trunk diameter, larger than any other species in its genus. The trunk swells at the base and has shallow roots. The bark is thin, gray-brown, and fissured into vertical bands. Trees growing in the open may have a crown that reaches the ground, whereas trees densely spaced together will exhibit a crown only at the top, where light can reach the leaves. As the tree ages, the top is damaged by wind and replaced by inferior branches. The species is long-lived; some trees can live well over a thousand years, with the oldest verified aged 1,460.

The foliage forms flat sprays with scale-like leaves in opposite pairs, with successive pairs at 90 degrees to each other. The foliage sprays are green throughout but marked with whitish stomatal bands below; they emit a strong aroma reminiscent of pineapple when crushed. The individual leaves are 1 to 4 millimetres (1/32 to 5/32 in) long and 1 to 2 mm (1/32 to 3/32 in) broad on most foliage sprays but up to 12 mm (1/2 in) long on strong-growing lead shoots. The foliage of individual branchlets turns orange-brown before falling off in autumn. Branches growing in full sunlight produce denser foliage with more overlap, while shaded branches grow more horizontally, with less overlap.

The cones are slender, 10 to 18 mm (3/8 to 11/16 in) long, and 4 to 5 mm (5/32 to 3/16 in) broad, with 8 to 12 (rarely 14) thin, overlapping scales. They are green to yellow-green, ripening brown in fall about six months after pollination, and open at maturity to shed the seeds. The seeds are 4 to 5 mm (5/32 to 3/16 in) long and 1 mm (1/32 in) broad, with a narrow papery wing down each side. The pollen cones are 3 to 4 mm (1/8 to 5/32 in) long, red or purple initially, and shed yellow pollen in spring.

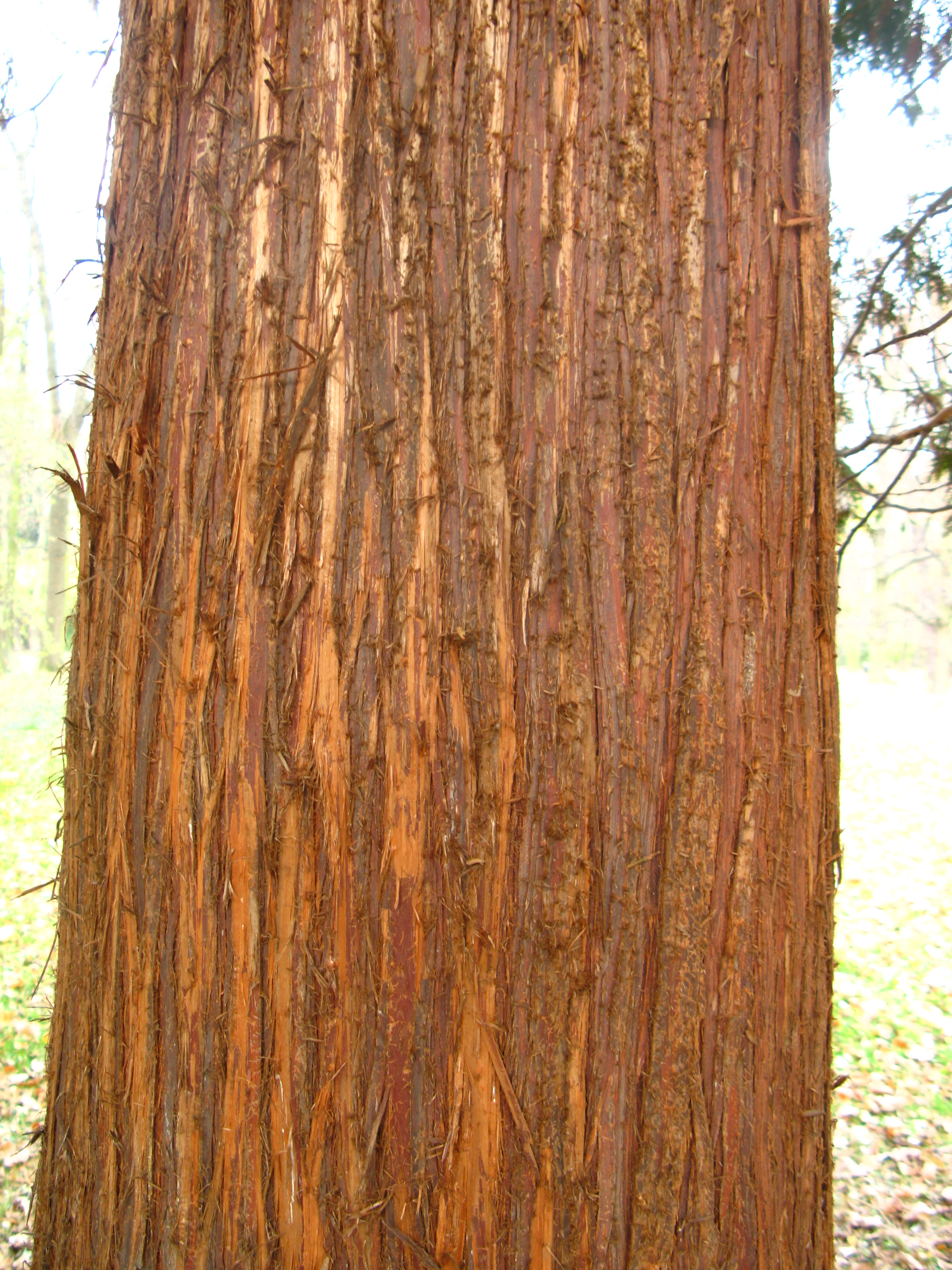
Bark

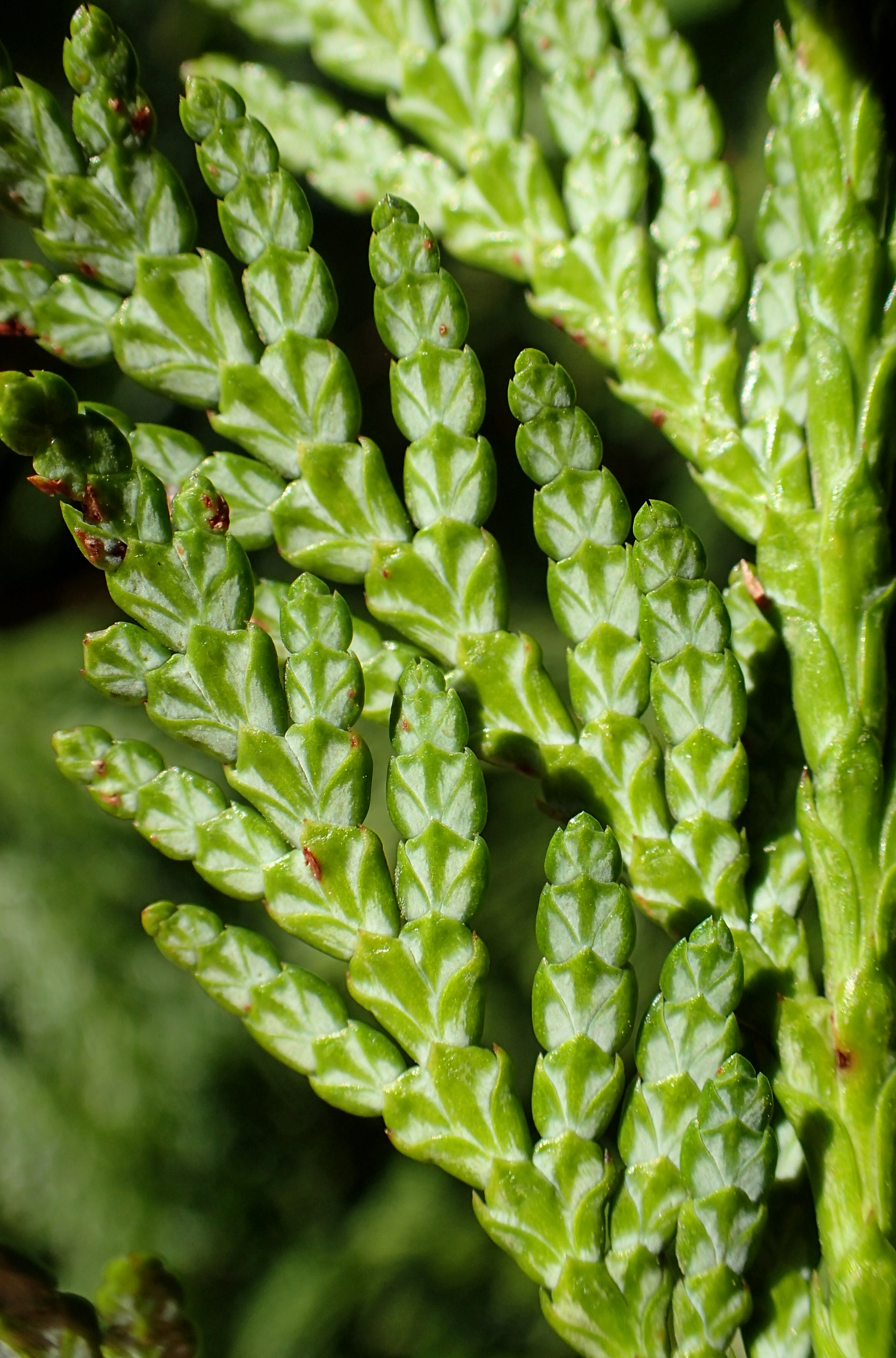
Leaves

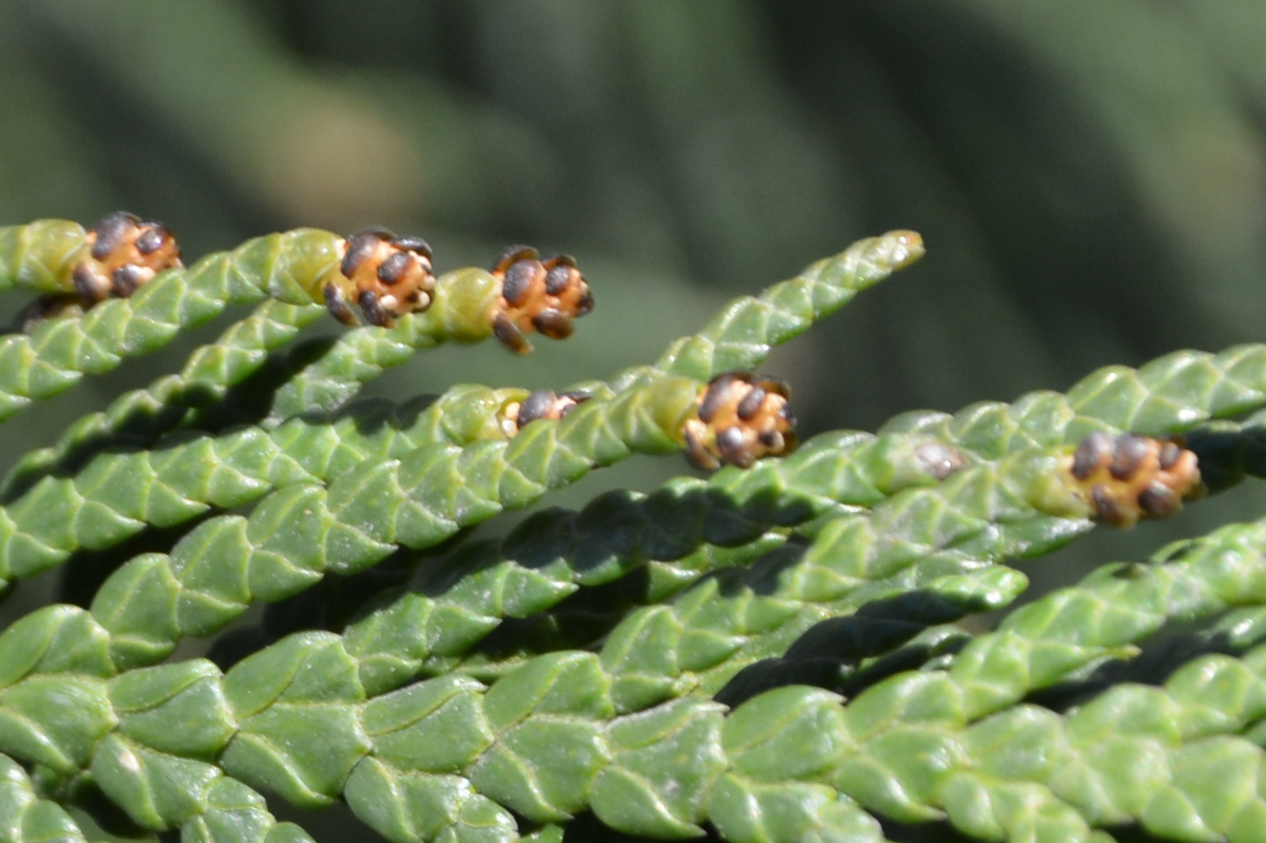
Shoot with pollen cones

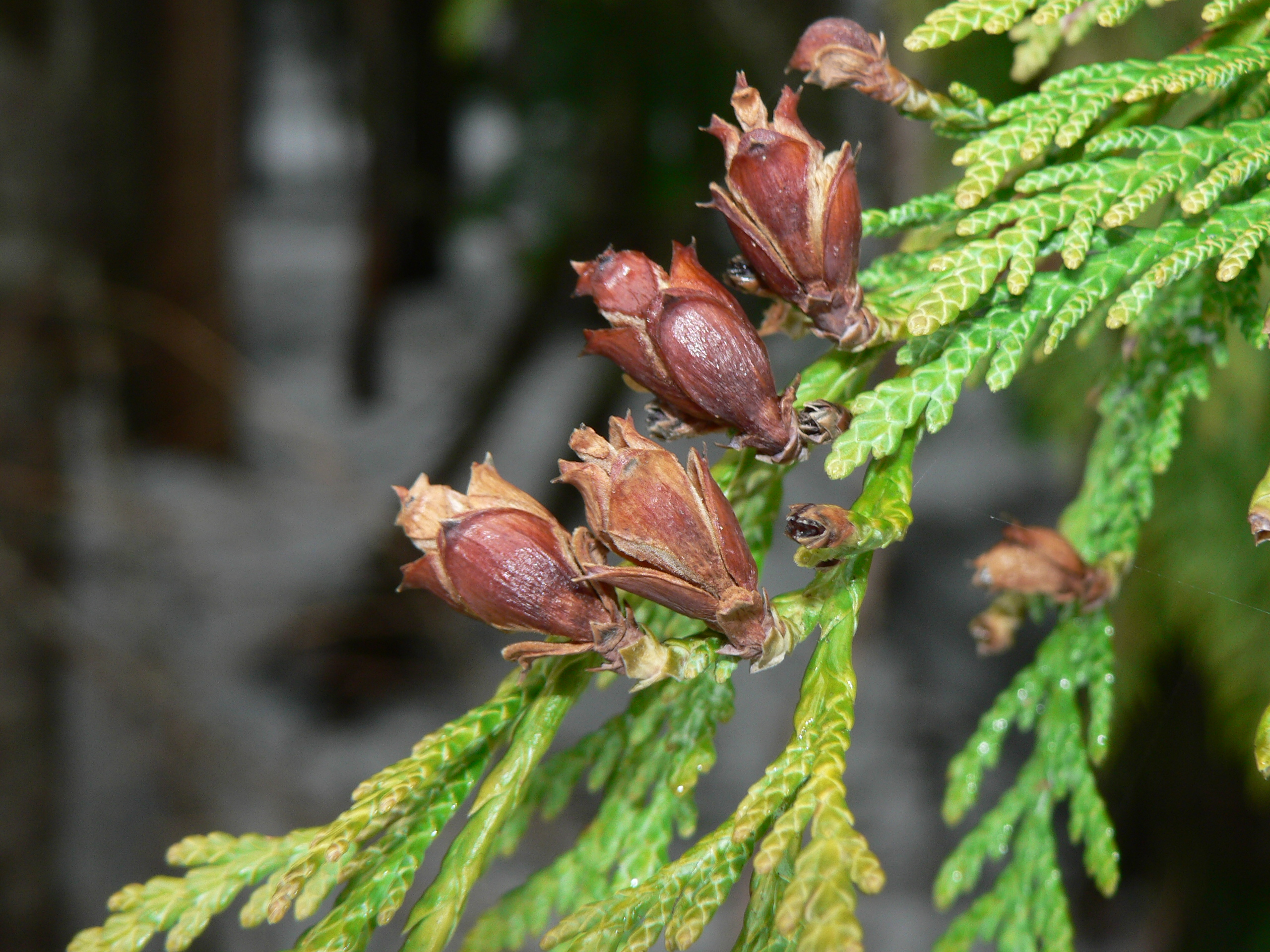
Shoot with mature seed cones

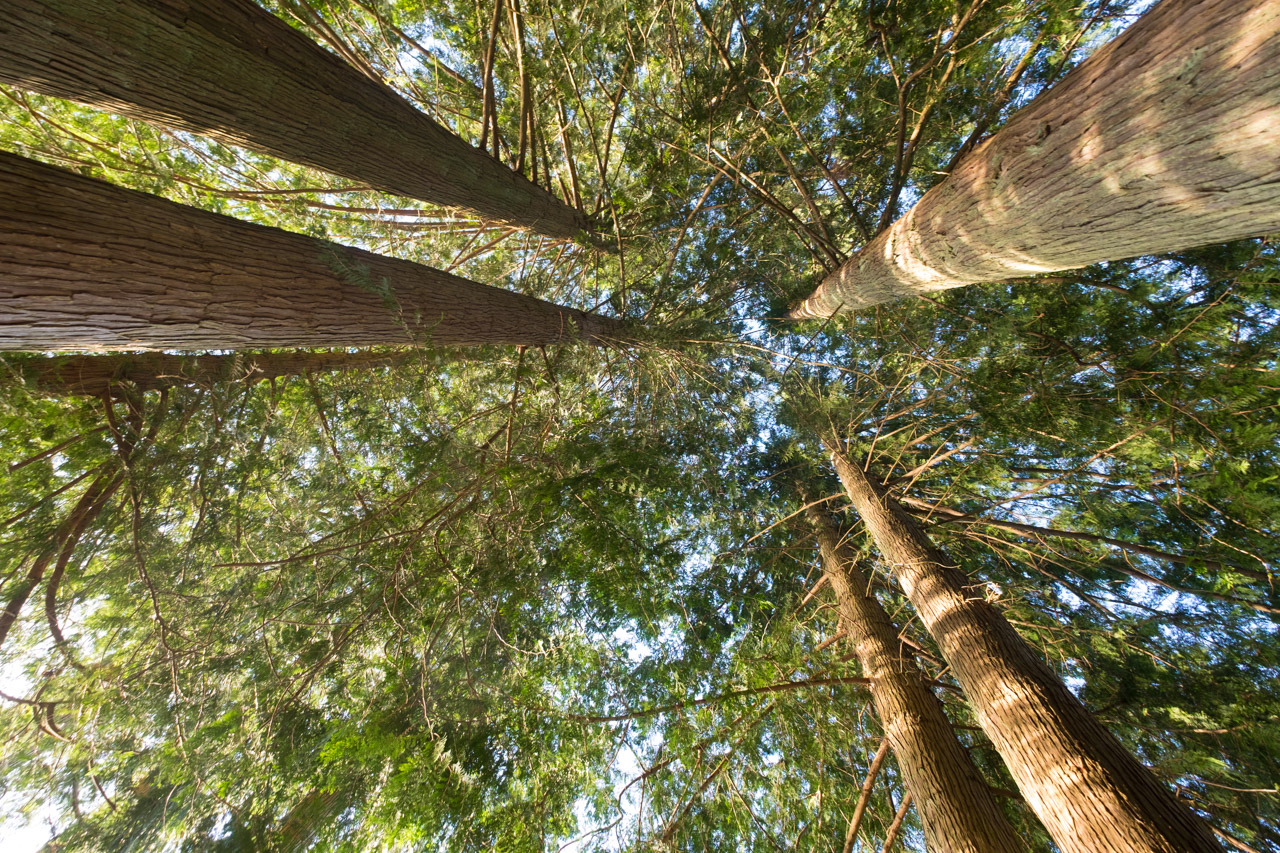
Keats Island

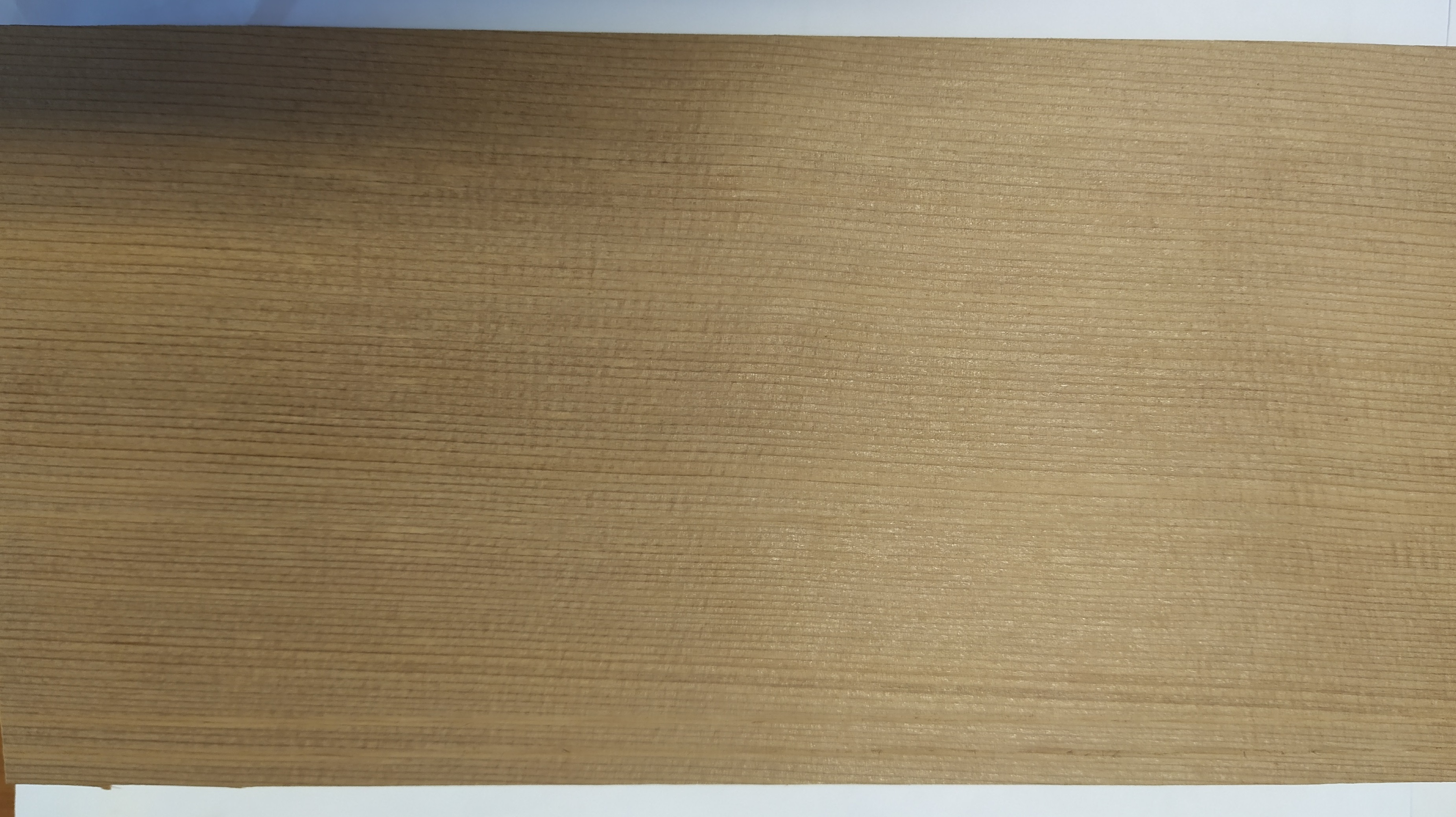
Wood specimen

=== Chemistry ===
The heartwood of western redcedar contains numerous chemical substances, such as plicatic acid, thujaplicatin methyl ether, hinokitiol and other thujaplicins, β-thujaplicinol, thujic acid, methyl thujate, 1,4-cineole, and γ-eudesmol. Plicatic acid is believed to be the main irritant and contact allergen responsible for provoking allergic reactions and asthma exacerbation. This leads to occupational asthma in woodworkers that are exposed to western redcedar wood dust. Thujaplicins serve as natural fungicides which prevent the wood from rotting. This effect lasts around a century even after the tree is felled. However, thujaplicins are only found in older trees. Saplings do not produce the chemical, causing them to often develop rot at an early stage, causing some trees to grow with a somewhat hollow trunk, as the tree moves to heal itself as it grows. Due to their fungicidal and anti-browning properties, thujaplicins are used in agriculture for fungal diseases and to prevent post-harvest decay. Thujaplicins, like other tropolones, are potent chelating agents and bind divalent metal ions. Basic and animal studies have shown that thujaplicins may have other biological properties, including antibacterial, antiviral, and antioxidant activities, however reliable evidence on their effectiveness is still lacking.

== Taxonomy ==
Thuja plicata is one of two Thuja species native to North America, the other being T. occidentalis. Nuclear genome analysis indicates that it is likely more closely related to T. koraiensis, which is native to the Korean Peninsula. The two species are hypothesized to have diverged in the Miocene.

A 2008 study found that western redcedar populations in coastal areas of Washington and Oregon are more genetically variable than populations in the Rocky Mountains and coastal British Columbia, indicating that the species most likely spread throughout its current range from a single refugium in the southern portion of its range after the Last Glacial Maximum. Some studies have suggested the existence of an inland refugium during the Last Glacial Maximum, likely in central Idaho. However, more recent genomic approaches corroborate the existence of only a single glacial refugium near the south of the current distribution, with subsequent expansion northward and inland since the last glacial maximum. Refugial populations may have undergone repeated population bottlenecks during the glacial maxima of the Pleistocene. Pollen cores indicate that T. plicata only became common in southern coastal British Columbia starting at approximately 6,000 YBP. This coincides with a transition from the warmer, drier climate of the early Holocene to a cooler, wetter climate. The species arrived later in the Canadian Rockies, as recently as 4,000–5,000 YBP. Pollen assemblages at Seeley Lake, on the eastern slope of the Coast Mountains east of Haida Gwaii, indicate that western redcedar became common there at approximately 2,200 YBP.

=== Etymology ===
The species name plicata derives from the Latin word plicāre and means 'folded in plaits' or 'braided,' a reference to the pattern of its small leaves.

Most authorities, both in Canada and the United States transliterate the English name in two words as 'western redcedar', or occasionally hyphenated as 'western red-cedar', to indicate that it is not a true cedar (Cedrus), but it also appears as 'western red cedar' in some popular works. In the American horticultural trade, it is also known as the giant arborvitae, by comparison with arborvitae for its close relative T. occidentalis. Other names include giant red cedar, Pacific red cedar, shinglewood, British Columbia cedar (being the province's official tree), canoe cedar, and red cedar. Arborvitae comes from the Latin for 'tree of life'; coincidentally, Native Americans of the West Coast also address the species as "long life maker".

One endonymous name for the tree is the Halkomelem word xepá:y, from the roots xíp, meaning 'scratch' or 'line', and á:y, 'bark'; the former root may be in reference to both the lined or "folded/braided" appearance of the bark and the tree's ubiquity in carving and other forms of woodwork. It is called x̱ápay̓ay in the Squamish language. Further south, in the Lushootseed language, the root for red cedar is x̌payʔ and x̌payʔac refers to a red cedar tree.

== Distribution and habitat ==
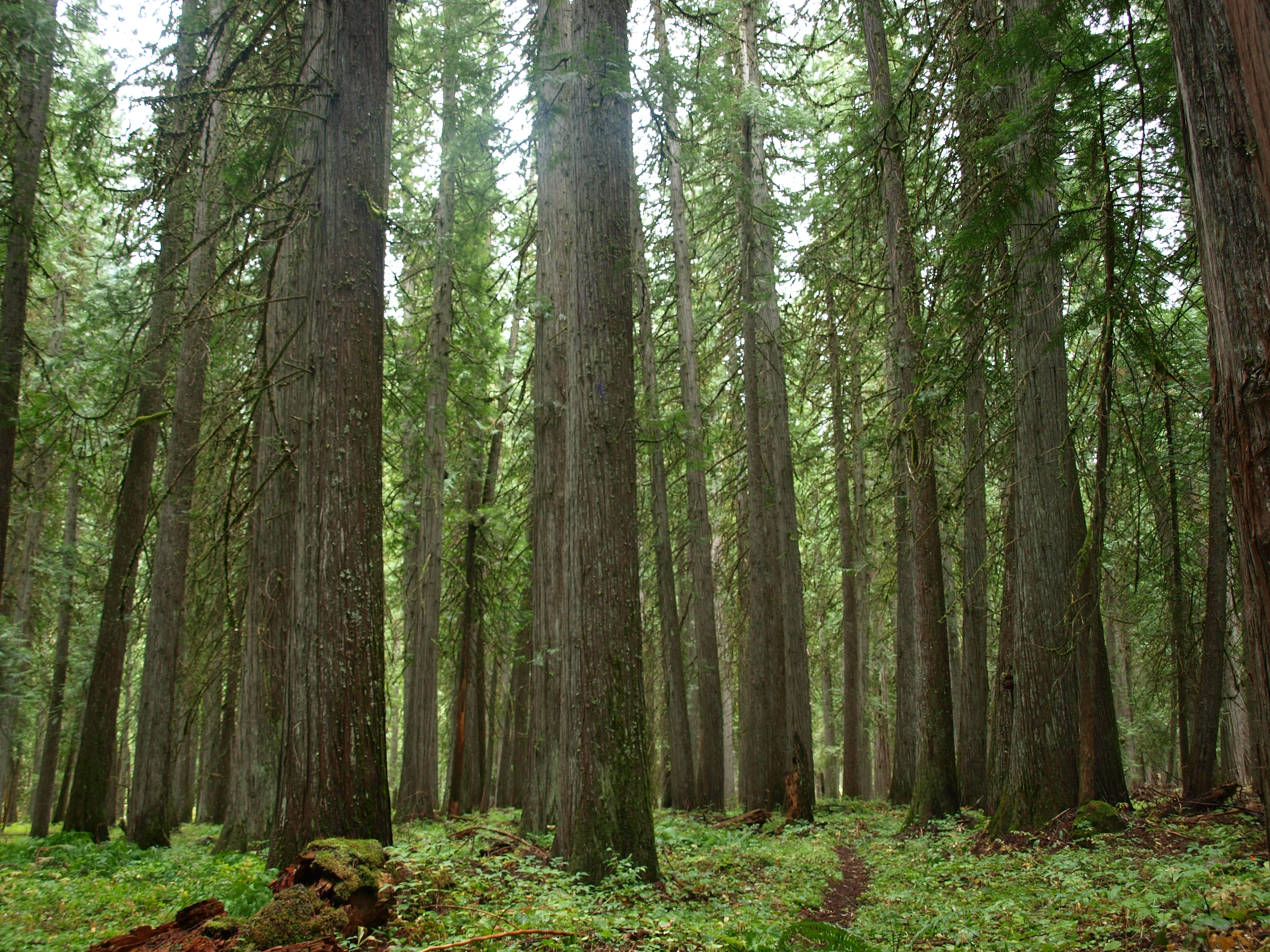
Thuja plicata often grows in moist valley bottoms.

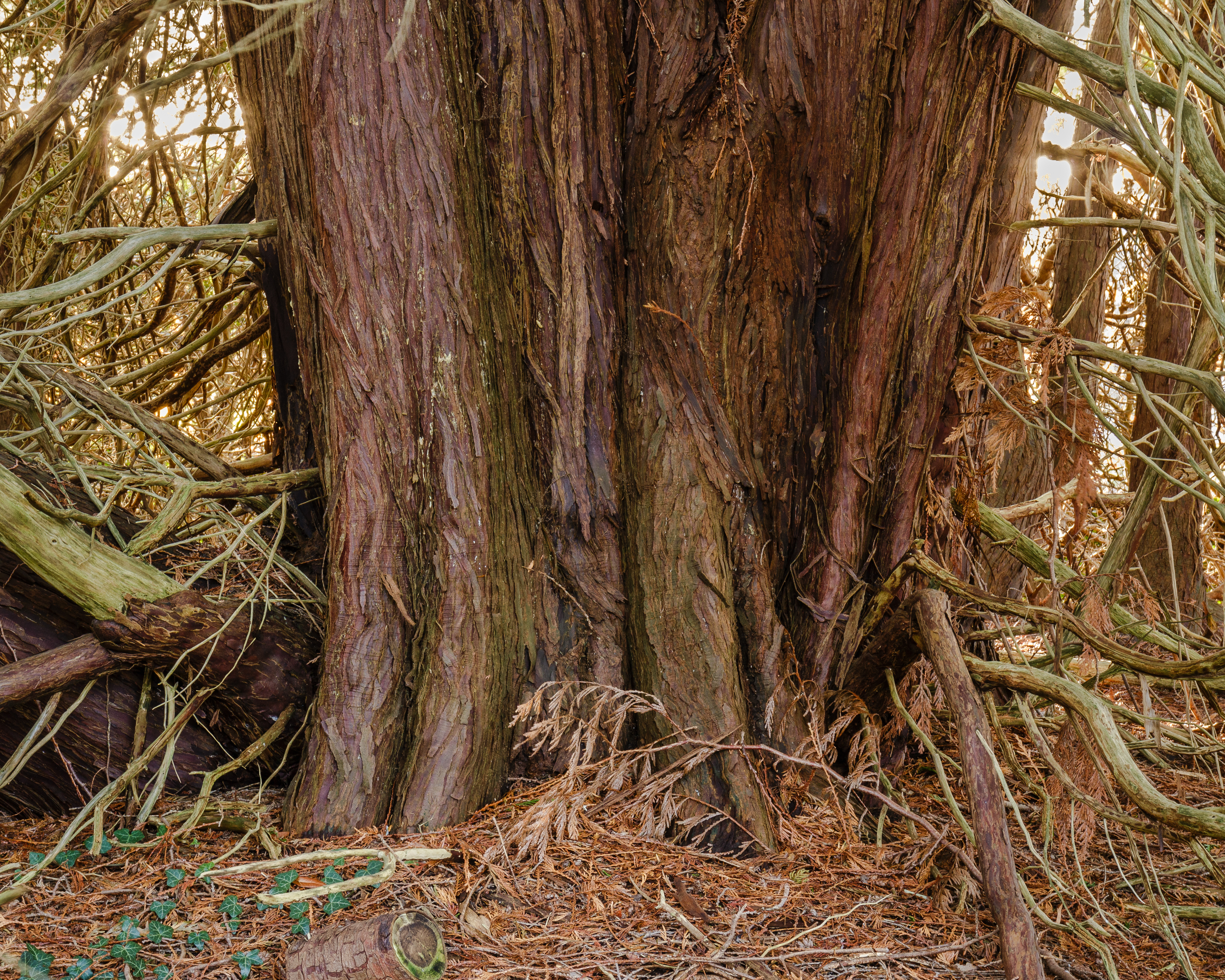
Typical rootstock of a Thuja plicata. (western redcedar)

Thuja plicata is among the most widespread trees in the Pacific Northwest. It is associated with Douglas-fir (Pseudotsuga menziesii) and western hemlock (Tsuga heterophylla) in most places where it grows. It grows best on moist sites in areas with a wet, maritime climate, and only occurs where precipitation exceeds 71 centimetres (28 in) annually. It grows from the Cascade Range and Coast Mountains westward to the Pacific Ocean, from central South East Alaska (near the village of Kake) to northern California (growing closer to the coast at the northern and southern extremes). A disjunct population occurs inland from central-southeast British Columbia through the Idaho Panhandle. The easternmost extent of its distribution occurs in Glacier National Park in Montana, where it is a major component of forests surrounding Lake McDonald. It is present east of the continental divide in the park, growing in a handful of small, isolated stands. It is usually found from sea level to elevations of 1,100 m (3,600 ft), but grows at altitudes of up to 2,290 m (7,510 ft) at Crater Lake in Oregon and 1,500 m (4,900 ft) in Idaho.

Western redcedar grows on many types of soils. It is present on all landforms and soil classes on Vancouver Island, but is restricted to wet, low-lying areas and streamsides in the drier eastern portions of its range. Unlike its associates western hemlock and Douglas-fir, western redcedar can grow well in environments with stagnant groundwater present less than 5 centimetres (2 in) below the soil surface in the winter. It does not grow as well in areas with flowing groundwater, unlike another common associate, Sitka spruce (Picea sitchensis). Western redcedars growing in the Rocky Mountains and along the eastern slope of the Washington Cascades are subject to higher mortality rates when growing on glacial till and sedimentary rocks than on other substrates. Western white pine (Pinus monticola) and Douglas-fir growing in these areas exhibit the opposite pattern, exhibiting low mortality rates on these substrates but high mortality rates on nutrient-poor metasedimentary rocks, a substrate on which western redcedar does not exhibit elevated mortality rates.

Western redcedar is less cold-tolerant than many conifer species that it shares its range with and is vulnerable to frost damage in late spring and early fall. Its northern range limit in Southeast Alaska and its upper elevational limits on Vancouver Island are controlled by temperature. In Southeast Alaska, it is absent from areas with mean summer temperatures less than 11 °C (52 °F). It does not grow in areas of coastal British Columbia with minimum temperatures of less than −30 °C (−22 °F), although some interior populations experience colder temperatures.

It has been introduced to other temperate zones, including further north in Alaska, western Europe, Australia (at least as far north as Sydney), New Zealand, and higher elevations of Hawaii. The species was described as invasive in Great Britain by a 2004 survey, although it is not listed as such by the United Kingdom Department for Environment, Food and Rural Affairs under the Wildlife and Countryside Act 1981 as of September 2022. Its presence has also been recorded in Poland, where it has been identified as a potentially problematic exotic species in the Białowieża Forest.

== Ecology ==
=== Use by wildlife ===
Western redcedar provides cover for bears, raccoons, skunks, and other animals which nest inside trunk cavities. It is used as a nest tree by cavity-nesting bird species such as yellow-bellied sapsuckers, hairy woodpeckers, tree swallows, chestnut-backed chickadees, and Vaux's swifts. Pileated woodpeckers on the Olympic Peninsula prefer very large western redcedars with heart rot when selecting roosting sites, but do not use them for nesting, instead relying on Pacific silver fir (Abies amabilis) for that purpose. Old-growth valley bottom forests of western redcedar and western hemlock are the preferred habitat for white-tailed deer in the Priest River drainage of northern Idaho. The dense canopies of these forests prevent deep snow accumulation, which makes movement difficult for the deer.

The foliage, especially that of saplings, is an important food source year-round for browsing ungulates such as Roosevelt elk and black-tailed deer, especially during the winter months when little else is available. Western redcedar foliage is more palatable for browsing herbivores than the commonly associated Sitka spruce and western hemlock. Browsing by introduced Sitka black-tailed deer is a major source of mortality for seedlings and saplings in old-growth forests on Haida Gwaii, where the deer lack natural predators. The presence of deer there has been linked to a decline in western redcedar recruitment. The seeds may be eaten by birds and rodents such as deer mice, but are apparently not the preferred food source for most species, possibly due to their small size or unpleasant odor. A 1937 study conducted in western Cowlitz County, Washington demonstrated a strong preference among deer mice for Douglas-fir and western hemlock seeds over western redcedar seeds. However, pine siskins apparently favor western redcedar seeds over those of Douglas-fir and western hemlock.

=== Forest succession ===
Western redcedar appears in all stages of forest succession, but as one of the most shade-tolerant species in the Rocky Mountains and Pacific Northwest it is considered to be a climax species along with western hemlock. It will readily establish and grow in the shade of other, less shade-tolerant species such as red alder (Alnus rubra), black cottonwood (Populus trichocarpa), or Douglas-fir, and prevent seedlings of those species from establishing themselves in its shade. However, western hemlock and Pacific silver fir are more tolerant of shade.

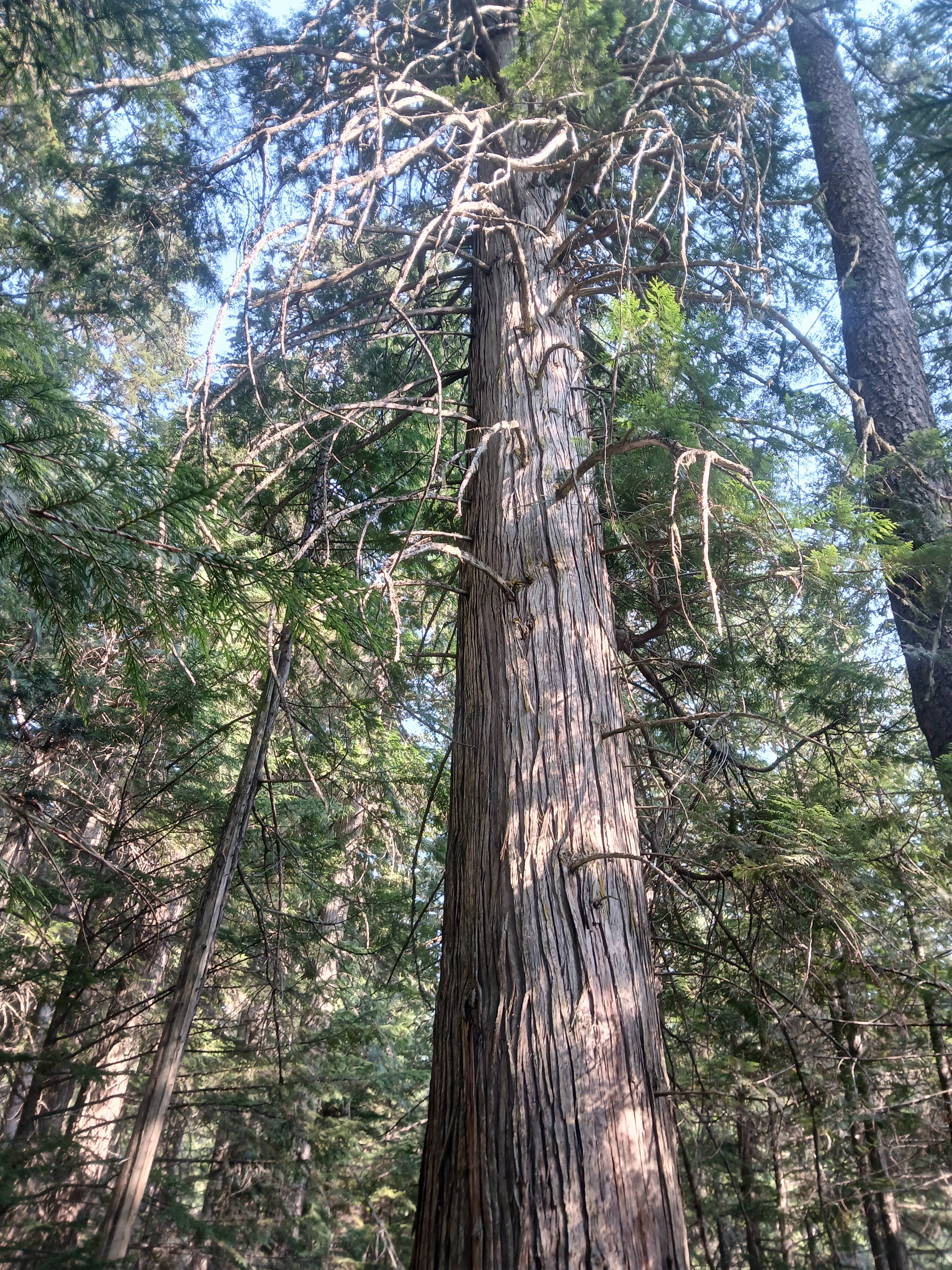
Western recedar in Glacier National Park

A 2010 study found that Thuja plicata growing in old-growth forests 300 to 700 metres (980 to 2,300 ft) above sea level in the North Shore Mountains of British Columbia have higher growth rates than associated western hemlock and Pacific silver fir when growing underneath a closed canopy. The study also found that western redcedars do not increase their growth rates in response to canopy gap formation that occurs after the death of a mature overstory tree as much as the two other species. This result indicates that western redcedar may be less reliant on canopy gaps for recruitment than western hemlock and Pacific silver fir. Western redcedar can also reproduce vegetatively via layering, as well as branch development from fallen branches or entire trees.

On northeastern Vancouver Island, western redcedar grows along with western hemlock in relatively open-canopied forests with an understory dominated by salal (Gaultheria shallon). Another type of forest characterized by dense stands of western hemlock and Pacific silver fir with sparse understory vegetation also occurs in the area. The two forest types occur in areas with very similar environmental conditions and are separated by sharp boundaries, often less than 10 metres (33 ft) wide. Western redcedar recruitment is nearly absent in the western hemlock-Pacific silver fir forest type, and there is no evidence of a transitional stage between the two types. It has been hypothesized that, once established, these forest types are self-sustaining and are unlikely to change unless a major disturbance occurs.

=== Fire ecology ===
It is considered to have low to moderate fire resistance, as its thin bark, shallow roots, low dense branching habit and flammable foliage offer little protection. Smaller trees are commonly killed by fire, but larger specimens often survive due to their size if they are not completely girdled. The intervals between fires within western redcedar stands tend to be very long, from 50 up to 350 years or more.

=== Pathology ===
Western redcedar shows susceptibility of varying degrees to the following soil pathogens: Armillaria ostoyae, Fomitopsis pinicola, Heterobasidion annosum, Phaeolus schweinitzii, Phellinus weirii, Rhizinia undulata, and Postia sericeomollis.

P. sericeomollis is responsible for brown cubical butt and pocket rot of cedar. It is the second-most common cause of decay in Western redcedar following P. weirii. Rather than forming a single column of decay in the heartwood, P. sericeomollis tends to cause rings or pockets of decay in the lower bole.

While Western redcedar is a host to P. weirii, the fungus which causes the disease laminated root rot, it is rated as resistant while other conifers are rated as highly susceptible or susceptible. P. weirii in Western redcedar expresses as a butt rot.

In addition to P. weirii, western redcedar is also less susceptible to H. annosum and A. ostoyae than other conifer species. Studies have found that western redcedar produces a phytochemical called thujaplicin which has been credited with granting the species its natural resistance to fungal attacks. Additional research has shown that western redcedar responds to A. ostoye infection by producing necrophylactic periderms and resin ducts near infection sites. Because of these natural defenses, it has been suggested that western redcedar may serve as a suitable alternative to other conifers when regenerating a site affected by these pathogens.

==== Cedar leaf blight ====
Western redcedar foliage can become infected by the ascomycete fungus Didymascella thujina, which causes cedar leaf blight. The fungus causes leaves to turn brown and does not spread between adjacent leaves through hyphae. It is present throughout the native range of western redcedar, but reproduces best when western redcedar foliage is wet for long periods of time, with minimal wind exposure. Significant variation in resistance to cedar leaf blight exists between populations of Thuja plicata; trees sourced from coastal populations exhibit higher resistance than trees from interior populations. Additional variation also occurs within populations. A study published in 2013 projected a decrease in the incidence of cedar leaf blight among western redcedars in coastal British Columbia by late 21st century as a result of warmer, drier summers due to climate change. The authors of the study conceded that they were unable to incorporate the impacts of warmer winter temperatures into their model because research on the topic was lacking at the time of their study. They hypothesized that warmer winter temperatures could result in increased incidence of cedar leaf blight and cautioned that management decisions should take this uncertainty into account.

==== Insect pathogens ====
Thuja plicata is a host to several destructive insect species such as the western cedar borer, cedar bark beetle, redcedar cone midge, and conifer seedling weevils. Redcedar cone midge (Mayetiola thujae) larvae hatch from eggs laid between the scales of immature cones, then feed on the cone scales and seeds. The application of insecticides has been used as a control measure.

=== Cedar dieback attributed to climate change ===
"Uncommonly hot, dry weather" in coastal Washington State, beginning in 2015, has been attributed as the underlying cause of a large dieback of this species that could not otherwise be attributed to any "killer pest or known pathogen."

== Cultivation ==
Like its relative Thuja occidentalis and many other conifer species, T. plicata is grown as an ornamental tree, and for screens and hedges, throughout the world in gardens and parks. A wide variety of forms, sizes, and colors are available.

Cultivars

The following cultivars have gained the Royal Horticultural Society's Award of Garden Merit:

- 'Atrovirens'
- 'Aurea'
- 'Stoneham Gold'
- 'Whipcord'
- 'Zebrina'

== Uses ==
=== In indigenous societies ===
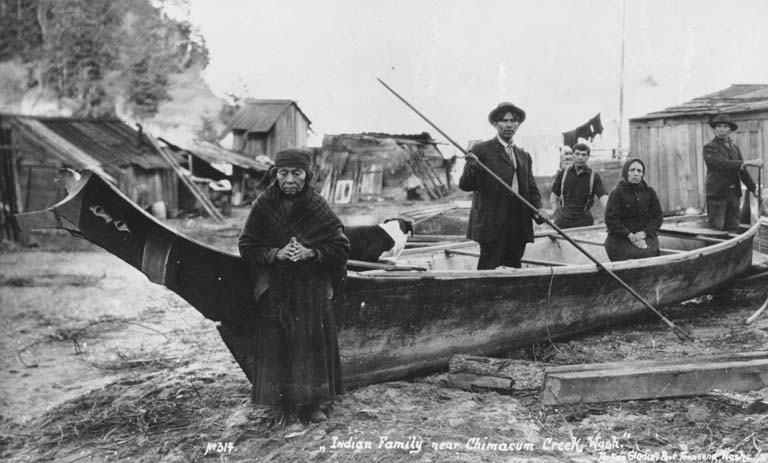
Klallam people and canoe, ca. 1914

Western redcedar is considered the Tree of Life by many of the First Nations of the Pacific Northwest, as the tree gave them everything that they needed for life: food, water (in the form of water tight woven cedar bark baskets), clothing, medicine, transportation (their canoes made from the wood), shelter (boards of wood used to build their long houses), and spirituality (the boughs being used in many ceremonies). Some northwest coast tribes refer to themselves as "people of the Red Cedar" because of their extensive dependence on the tree for basic materials. The wood has been used for constructing housing and totem poles, and crafted into many objects, including masks, utensils, boxes, boards, instruments, canoes, vessels, houses, and ceremonial objects. Western redcedar is also associated with a long tradition of curing and cooking fish over the open fire. Roots and bark are used for baskets, bowls, ropes, clothing, blankets, and rings.

A huge number of archaeological finds point to the continuous use of redcedar wood in native societies. Woodworking tools dating between 8,000 and 5,000 years ago, such as carved antlers, were discovered in shell middens at the Glenrose site, near Vancouver, British Columbia. In Yuquot, on the west coast of Vancouver Island, tools dating 4,000 to 3,000 years old have been found. The Musqueam site, also near Vancouver, yielded bark baskets woven in five different styles, along with ropes and ships dated to 3,000 years ago. At Pitt River, adzes and baskets were dated around 2,900 years ago. Wooden artefacts 1000 years old were unearthed on the east coast of Vancouver Island.

Western redcedar was used extensively wherever it was found along the northwest coast (British Columbia, Washington state, parts of Alaska). Evidence of this use is found in culturally modified trees (CMTs) that are found throughout the coast. When First Nations people removed the bark from cedars, it left a scar – which is considered a CMT. Other types of harvest (for planks, tinder, and other uses) leave different types of evidence of cultural modification.

A legend amongst the Coast Salish peoples describes the origins of the western redcedar. In this legend, there was a generous man who gave the people whatever they needed. When the Great Spirit saw this, he declared that when the generous man died, a great Red Cedar tree will grow where he is buried, and that the cedar will be useful to all the people, providing its roots for baskets, bark for clothing, and wood for shelter.

==== Tools ====
The wood was worked primarily with the adze, which was preferred over all other tools, even ones introduced by Europeans. Alexander Walker, an ensign on the fur trade ship Captain Cook, reported that the indigenous peoples used an elbow adze, which they valued over tools brought by the Europeans, such as the saw or the axe, going so far as to modify traded tools back into an adze. Tools were generally made from stone, bone, obsidian, or a harder wood such as hemlock. A variety of hand mauls, wedges, chisels, and knives are also used.

Excavations done at Ozette, Washington, turned up iron tools nearly 800 years old, far before European contact. When James Cook passed the area, he observed that almost all tools were made of iron. There has been speculation on the origin of these iron tools. Some theories include shipwrecks from East Asia or possible contact with iron-using cultures from Siberia, as hinted in the more advanced woodworking found in northern tribes such as the Tlingit.

==== Wood ====
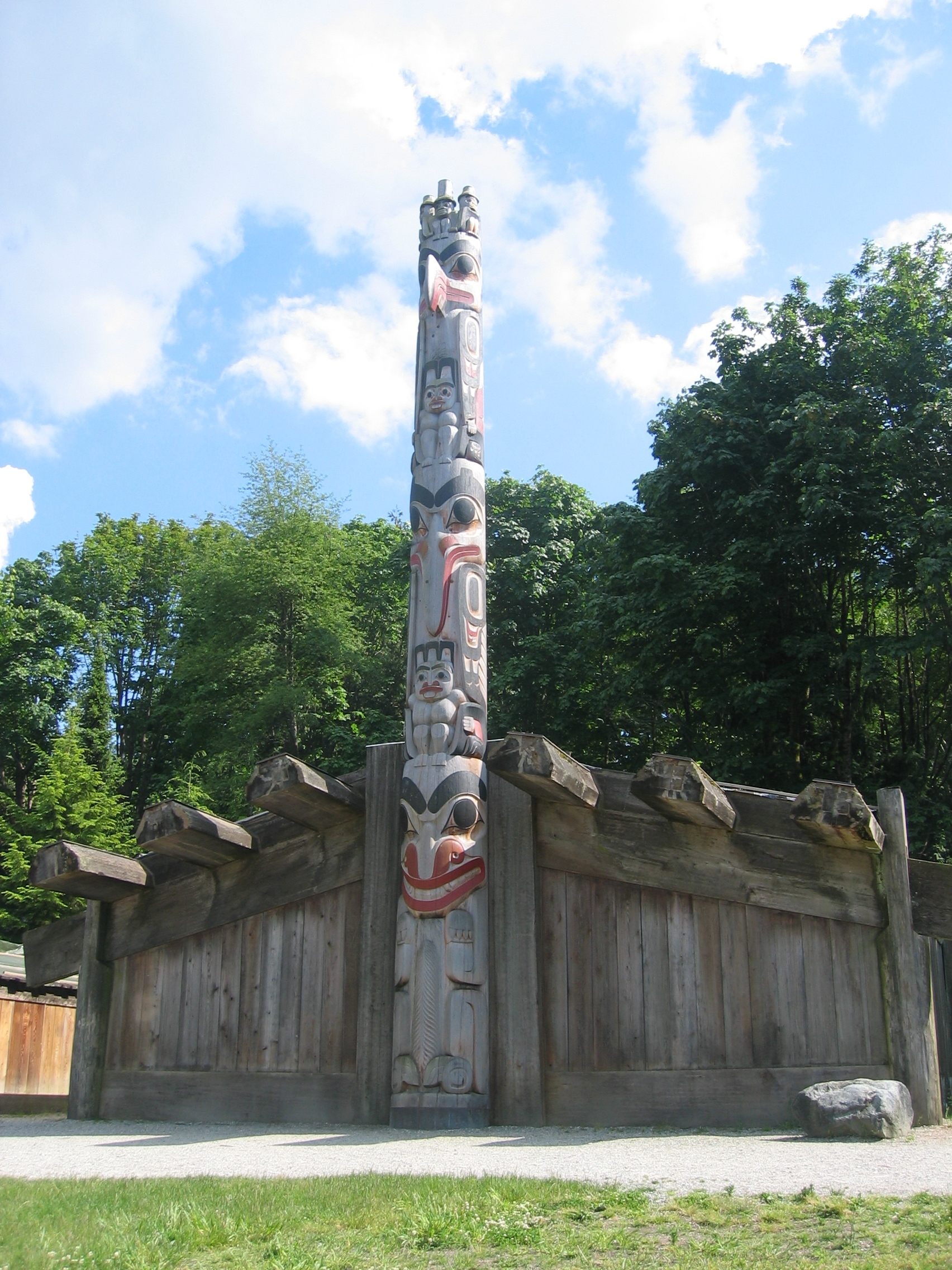
A totem pole outside a six-post house at the University of British Columbia

Harvesting western redcedar required some ceremony and included propitiation of the tree's spirits as well as those of the surrounding trees. In particular, many people specifically requested the tree and its brethren not to fall or drop heavy branches on the harvester, a situation which is mentioned in a number of different stories of people who were not sufficiently careful. Some professional loggers of Native American descent have mentioned that they offer quiet or silent propitiations to trees which they fell, following in this tradition.

Felling of large trees such as western redcedar before the introduction of steel tools was a complex and time-consuming art. Typically the bark was removed around the base of the tree above the buttresses. Then some amount of cutting and splitting with stone adzes and mauls would be done, creating a wide triangular cut. The area above and below the cut would be covered with a mixture of wet moss and clay as a firebreak. Then the cut would be packed with tinder and small kindling and slowly burned. The process of cutting and burning would alternate until the tree was mostly penetrated through, and then careful tending of the fire would fell the tree in the best direction for handling. This process could take many days. A constant rotation of workers was involved to keep the fires burning through night and day, often in a remote and forbidding location.

Once the tree was felled, the work had only just begun, as it then had to be stripped and dragged down to the shore. If the tree was to become canoes, then it would often be divided into sections and worked into rough canoe shapes before transport. If it were to be used for a totem pole or building materials, it would be towed in the round to the village. Many trees are still felled in this traditional manner for use as totem poles and canoes, particularly by artists who feel that using modern tools is detrimental to the traditional spirit of the art. Non-traditionalists simply buy redcedar logs or lumber at mills or lumber yards, a practice that is commonly followed by most working in smaller sizes such as for masks and staves.

Because felling required such an extraordinary amount of work, if only planks for housing were needed, these would be split from the living tree. The bark was stripped and saved, and two cuts were made at the ends of the planking. Then wedges would be pounded in along the sides and the planks slowly split off the side of the tree. Trees which have been so harvested are still visible in some places in the rainforest, with obvious chunks taken off of their sides. Such trees usually continue to grow perfectly well, since redcedar wood is resistant to decay. Planks are straightened by a variety of methods, including weighing them down with stones, lashing them together with rope, or forcing them between a line of stakes.

Redcedar wood is used to make huge monoxyla canoes in which the men went out to high sea to harpoon whales and conduct trade. One of those canoes, a 12-metre (38 ft) craft dug out about a century ago, was bought in 1901 by Captain John Voss, an adventurer. He gave her the name of Tilikum ('Relative' in Chinook jargon), rigged her, and led her in a hectic three-year voyage from British Columbia to London.

Redcedar branches are very flexible and have good tensile strength. They were stripped and used as strong cords for fishing line, nets, rope cores, twine, and other purposes where bark cord was not strong enough or might fray. Both the branches and bark rope have been replaced by modern fiber and nylon cordage among the aboriginal northwest coast peoples, though the bark is still in use for the other purposes mentioned above.

==== Bark ====
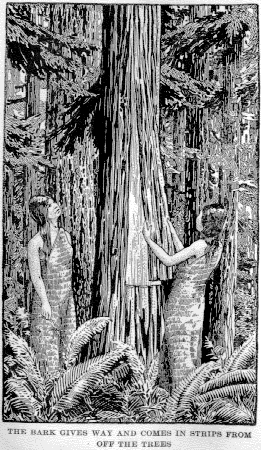
Illustration of women pulling bark from a tree, from Indian Legends of Vancouver Island by Alfred Carmichael

At the right time of year, the bark is easily removed from live trees in long strips. It is harvested for use in making mats, rope and cordage, basketry, rain hats, clothing, and other soft goods. The harvesting of bark must be done with care, as stripping too much bark will kill the tree. To prevent this, the harvester usually only harvests from trees that have not been stripped before. After harvesting, the tree is not used for bark again, although it may later be felled for wood. Stripping bark is usually started with a series of cuts at the base of the tree above any buttresses, after which the bark is peeled upwards. To remove bark high up, a pair of platforms strung on rope around the tree are used and the harvester climbs by alternating between them for support. Since western redcedars lose their lower branches as all tall trees do in the rainforest, the harvester may climb 10 m (33 ft) or more into the tree by this method. The harvested bark is folded and carried in backpacks. It can be stored for quite some time as mold does not grow on it and is moistened before unfolding and working. It is then split lengthwise into the required width and woven or twisted into shape. Bark harvesting was mostly done by women, despite the danger of climbing ten meters in the air, because they were the primary makers of bark goods.

Today bark rope making is a lost art in many communities, although it is still practiced for decoration or art in a few places. Other uses of bark are still common for artistic or practical purposes. In recent years there has been a revival of cedar weaving in some communities, and along with it, new forms of cedar bark products. For example, in some recent weddings cedar roses are used to decorate the tables.

=== Timber ===
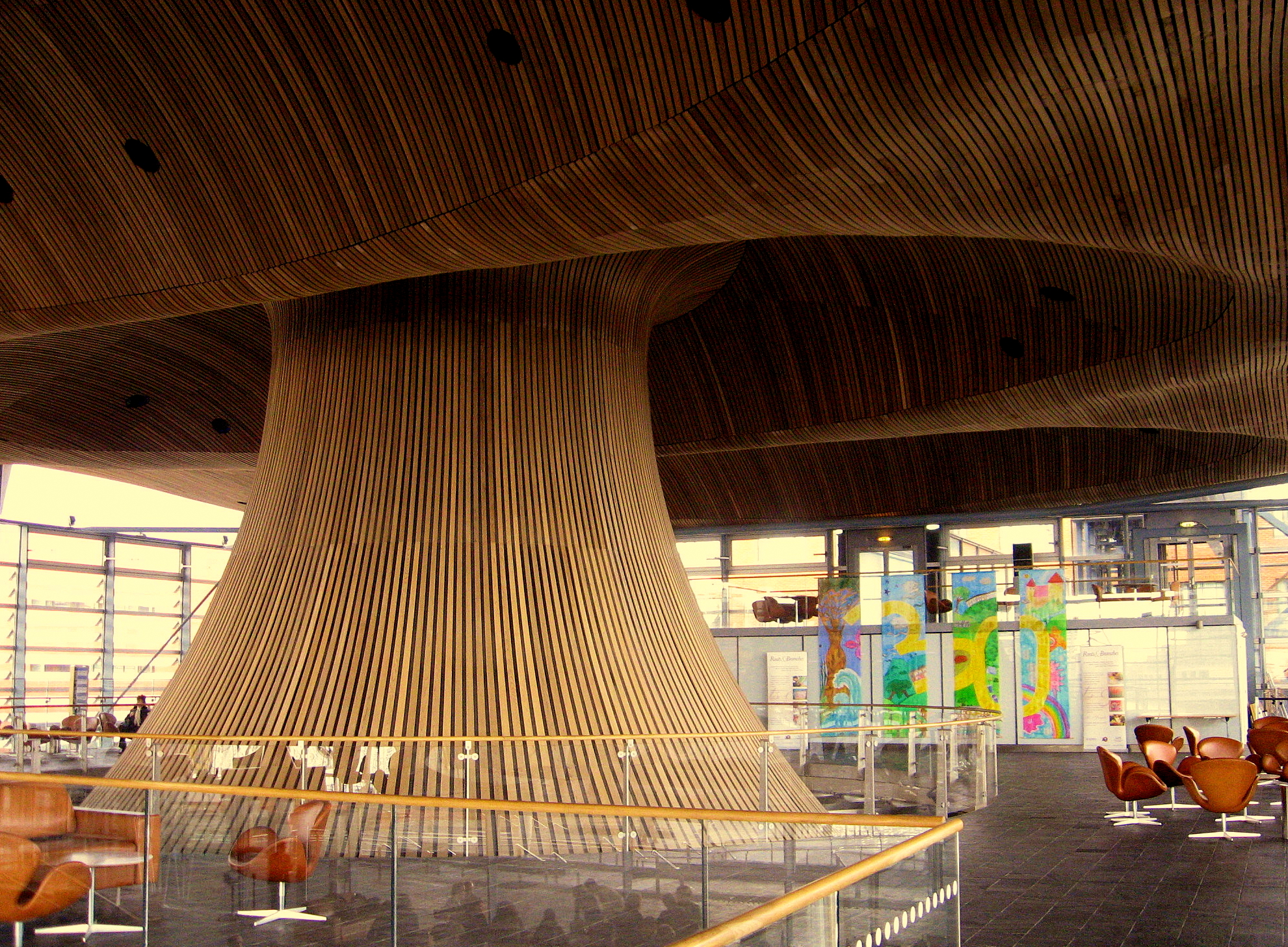
Canadian western redcedar cowl in the National Assembly for Wales

The soft red-brown timber has a tight, straight grain and few knots. It is valued for its distinct appearance, aroma, and its high natural resistance to decay, being extensively used for outdoor construction in the form of posts, decking, shingles, and siding. It is commonly used for the framing and longwood in lightweight sail boats and kayaks. In larger boats it is often used in sandwich construction between two layers of epoxy resin and/or fiberglass or similar products. Due to its light weight – 390 to 400 kg/m^{3} (24 to 25 lb/cu ft) dried – it is about 30% lighter than common boat building woods, such as mahogany. For its weight it is quite strong but can be brittle. It glues well with epoxy resin or resorcinol adhesive.

Its light weight, strength, and dark, warm sound make it a popular choice for guitar soundboards, particularly among European guitar builders such as Lowden and Furch.

Western redcedar wood is export-restricted in the United States. The tree is highly allergenic and woodworkers or loggers who work with it may have adverse reactions, including the development of occupational asthma, exacerbation of existing asthma, reduction of lung function, and eye irritation. Approximately 5% of workers are allergic to western redcedar. The US Occupational Safety and Health Administration has set a permissible exposure limit for western redcedar dust of 2.5 mg/m^{3} as a time-weighted average over eight hours.

=== Essential oil ===
The essential oil of western redcedar leaves contains natural compounds, such as α-thujone, β-thujone, fenchone, sabinene, terpinen-4-ol and beyerene, which have also been isolated from different other essential oils. Some of these substances are aroma compounds and are used in perfumery. Thujones are GABA_{A} receptor competitive antagonists, but do not have any pharmacological use due to their high toxicity and convulsive activity.

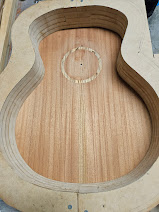
Western redcedar used as a guitar top for a steel stringed guitar

=== Other uses ===
It is also widely used throughout Europe and America for making beehive components.

Its bark has been studied for applications in polyurethane.

Used in the construction of windows and doors (joinery grade timber).

Western red cedar is still highly valued as "tonewood" for stringed instruments' sound boards.

== Notable specimens ==
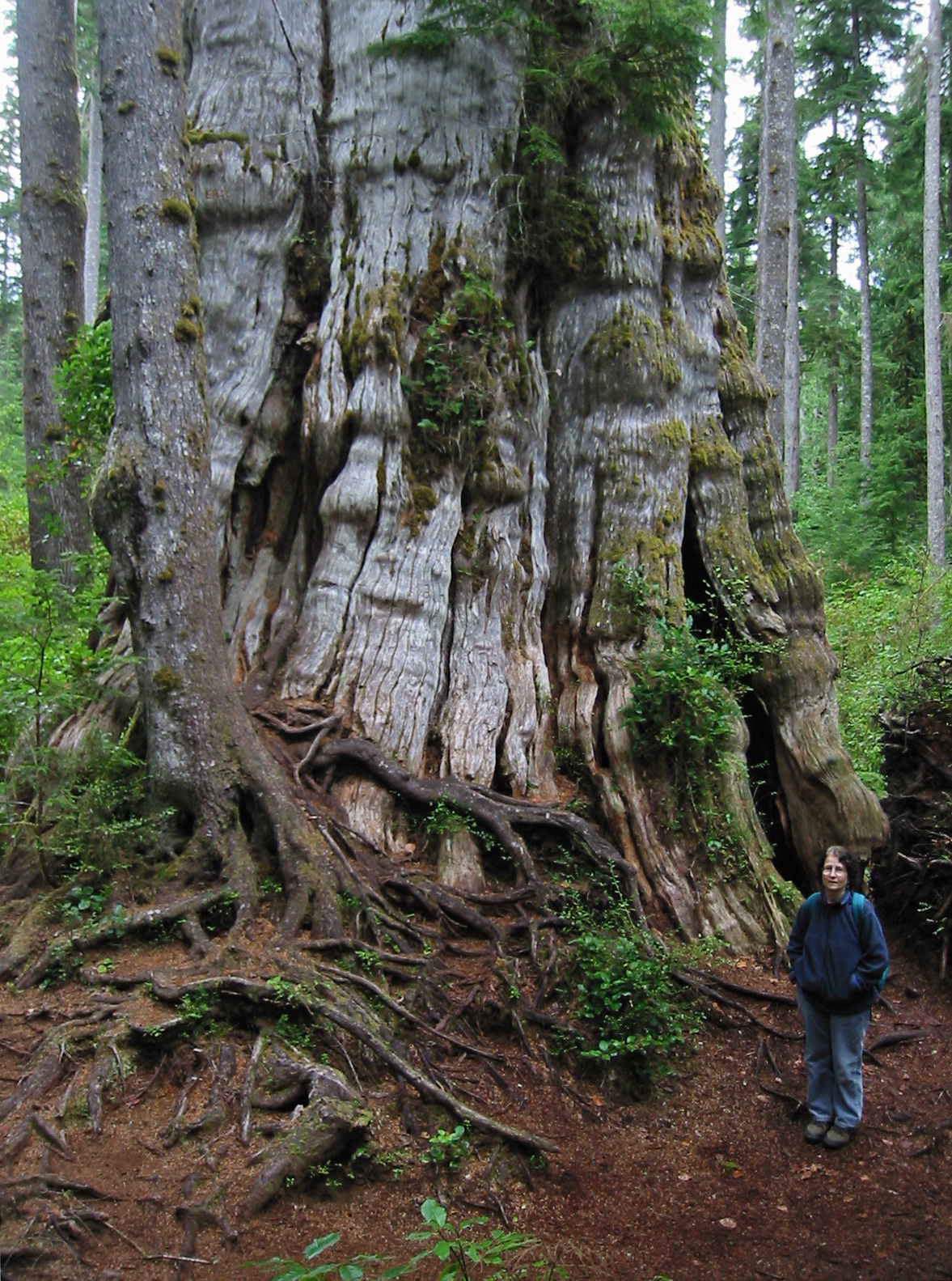
The Quinault Lake Redcedar was the world's largest western redcedar.

The largest living specimen is the Cheewhat Giant, in Pacific Rim National Park Reserve on Vancouver Island, at 450 cubic metres (15,870 cu ft), with a diameter of 5.8 m (19 ft). The tallest well-documented individual is a tree in Goldstream Provincial Park, on Vancouver Island. It stands 71.5m tall, although even taller ones are likely to exist further south in the species range. The 'Quinault Lake Redcedar' was the largest known western redcedar in the world, with a wood volume of 500 m^{3} (17,650 cu ft). Located near the northwest shore of Lake Quinault north of Aberdeen, Washington, about 34 kilometres (21 mi) from the Pacific Ocean, it was one-third the volume of the largest known tree, a giant sequoia named 'General Sherman'. The Quinault Lake Redcedar was 53 m (174 ft) tall with a diameter of 5.9 m (19.5 ft) at breast height. The Quinault Lake Redcedar was destroyed by a series of storms in 2014 and 2016 and is now only a stump. The fifth-largest known was the Kalaloch Cedar in Olympic National Park, at 350 m^{3} (12,370 cu ft), until it was destroyed by a storm in March 2014.

A redcedar over 71 m (233 ft) tall, 4.5 m (15 ft) in diameter, and over 700 years old stood in Cathedral Grove on Vancouver Island before it was set on fire and destroyed by vandals in 1972. That tree now lies in "Giant's Grave", a self-dug 'grave' created by the force of its own impact. A specimen measuring 5.5 m (18 ft) diameter and 54 m (177 ft) tall on the Giant Red Cedar National Recreation Trail in the Idaho Panhandle National Forests is designated the "Champion Tree of Idaho".

The Giant Cedar Stump is an ancient redcedar turned roadside attraction in Snohomish County, Washington.

== See also ==
- List of plants known as cedar
- List of superlative trees

== Works cited ==
- Bitner, Richard L. (2007). Conifers for Gardens: an Illustrated Encyclopedia. United Kingdom: Timber Press. ISBN 978-0-88192-830-3.
- Chambers, Kenton L. (1993). "Thuja plicata". In Flora of North America Editorial Committee (ed.). Flora of North America North of Mexico (FNA). Vol. 2. New York and Oxford: Oxford University Press – via eFloras.org, Missouri Botanical Garden, St. Louis, Missouri and Harvard University Herbaria, Cambridge, Massachusetts.
- Chedgy, Russell J.; Lim, Young Woon & Breuil, Colette (2009). "Effects of leaching on fungal growth and decay of western redcedar (Thuja plicata)". Canadian Journal of Microbiology. 55 (5): 578–586. doi:10.1139/W08-161. PMID 19483786.
- DeCapua, Sarah (2010). The Tlingit. First Americans. Tarrytown, New York: Marshall Cavendish Benchmark. ISBN 978-0-7614-4135-9.
- Dill, J. Gregory (2006). Myth, Fact, And Navigators' Secrets: Incredible Tales of the Sea And Sailors. Guilford, Connecticut: The Lyons Press. ISBN 1-59228-879-0.
- Farjon, A. (2005). Monograph of Cupressaceae and Sciadopitys. Royal Botanic Gardens, Kew. ISBN 1-84246-068-4.
- Gardner, J. A. F. (1963). The Chemistry and Utilization of Western Red Cedar. Ottawa, Ontario: Department of Forestry. OCLC 65814710.
- Hill, Anthony (1985). Antique Furniture in Australia. Victoria, British Columbia: Viking Press. ISBN 0-670-80319-7.
- McNeese, Tim (2002). Early North America. St. Louis, Missouri: Milliken Publishing. ISBN 0-7877-0527-6.
- Miller, Mike (2008). Alaska's Southeast: Touring the Inside Passage (11th ed.). Guilford, Connecticut: Globe Pequot Press. ISBN 978-0-7627-4535-7. ISSN 1545-1941.
- Pritzker, Barry M. (1998). Native Americans: An Encyclopedia of History, Culture, and Peoples. Vol. 1. Santa Barbara, California: ABC-CLIO. ISBN 0-87436-836-7.
- Stewart, Hilary (1984). Cedar: Tree of Life to the Northwest Coast Indians. Vancouver, British Columbia: Douglas & McIntyre. ISBN 0-88894-437-3.
- Van Pelt, Robert (2001). Forest Giants of the Pacific Coast. Global Forest Society and University of Washington Press. ISBN 0-295-98140-7.
- Zsolt Debreczy; Istvan Racz (2012). Kathy Musial (ed.). Conifers Around the World (1st ed.). DendroPress. p. 1089. ISBN 978-963-219-061-7. Archived from the original on 8 December 2015.
