= Mayetiola hordei =

Scientific classification
- Kingdom: Animalia
- Phylum: Arthropoda
- Class: Insecta
- Order: Diptera
- Family: Cecidomyiidae
- Genus: Mayetiola
- Species: M. hordei

Binomial name
- Mayetiola hordei Kieffer, 1909

Species of fly

Mayetiola hordei,, the barley stem gall midge, is a cereal pest in Tunisia, closely related to the Hessian fly.
