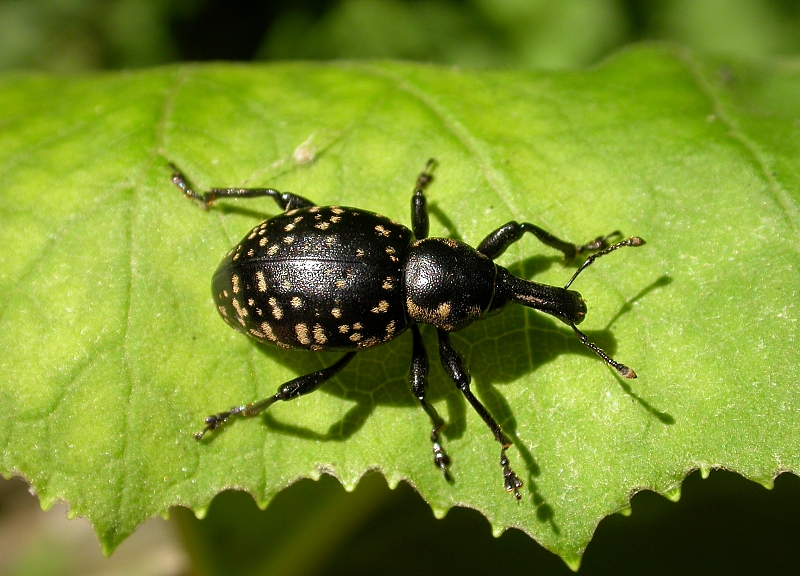
- Liparus glabrirostris

Scientific classification
- Kingdom: Animalia
- Phylum: Arthropoda
- Clade: Pancrustacea
- Class: Insecta
- Order: Coleoptera
- Suborder: Polyphaga
- Infraorder: Cucujiformia
- Superfamily: Curculionoidea
- Family: Curculionidae
- Subfamily: Molytinae
- Tribe: Molytini; C.J. Schönherr, 1823

Synonyms
- Molytides Schönherr, 1823

= Molytini =

Tribe of beetles

The Molytini are a tribe of weevil genera in the subfamily Molytinae, erected by Carl Schönherr in 1823. He described a type genus called Molytes Schönherr, 1823, which is now considered a synonym of Liparus Olivier, 1807.

== Subtribes and genera ==
As of October 2026, BioLib includes:

subtribe Molytina Schönherr, 1823

1. Anisorhynchus Schönherr, 1842
2. Euthycus Pascoe, 1885
3. Kyliparus Morimoto, 1982
4. Leiosoma Stephens, 1829
5. Liparus Olivier, 1807
6. Morimotodes Grebennikov, 2014

subtribe Plinthina Lacordaire, 1863

1. Adexius Schönherr, 1834
2. Alloplinthus F. Solari, 1941
3. Caulomorphus Faust, 1886
4. Freyianus Zumpt, 1932
5. Hoplopteridius K. Daniel, 1908
6. Iberoplinthus Meregalli, 1986
7. Kurilio Zherikhin & Egorov, 1991
8. Metahylobius Nakane, 1964
9. Minyops Schönherr, 1823
10. Mitoplinthus Reitter, 1897
11. Neoplinthus Bedel, 1884
12. Paraminyops G. Osella & Bellò, 2010
13. Plinthus Germar, 1817

unplaced genera

1. Abrotheus Broun, 1917
2. Gastrotaphrus Buchanan, 1936
3. Steremnius Schönherr, 1835
