= Steremnius =

- Steremnius carinatus

Scientific classification
- Kingdom: Animalia
- Phylum: Arthropoda
- Clade: Pancrustacea
- Class: Insecta
- Order: Coleoptera
- Suborder: Polyphaga
- Infraorder: Cucujiformia
- Superfamily: Curculionoidea
- Family: Curculionidae
- Subfamily: Molytinae
- Tribe: Molytini
- Genus: Steremnius; Schönherr, 1835

Genus of beetles

Steremnius is a genus of true weevils in the beetle family Curculionidae. There are at least four described species in Steremnius.

== Species ==
These four species belong to the genus Steremnius:

- Steremnius carinatus (Boheman, 1842) (conifer seedling weevil)
- Steremnius scrobiculatus Dalla Torre & Schenkling, 1932
- Steremnius shermani (Fiske, 1906)
- Steremnius tuberosus Gyllenhal, 1836
