= Mayetiola thujae =

Scientific classification
- Domain: Eukaryota
- Kingdom: Animalia
- Phylum: Arthropoda
- Class: Insecta
- Order: Diptera
- Family: Cecidomyiidae
- Genus: Mayetiola
- Species: M. thujae

Binomial name
- Mayetiola thujae Hedlin, 1959 (Originally Phytophaga thujae)

Synonyms
- Phytophaga thujae

Species of fly

Mayetiola thujae, the redcedar cone midge, is a species of gall midge that infects western redcedar (Thuja plicata) cones.

== Description ==
Males are 2.44 millimetres (0.096 in) long on average. Females are somewhat larger, averaging 2.77 millimetres (0.109 in) in length, and have retractible ovipositors. The adults of both sexes are dark gray.

== Ecology ==
Eggs are laid on the inner surface of female western redcedar cones in the March or April, shortly after pollination occurs. The eggs are oblong and translucent, but appear to be orange due to the color of the larvae. The eggs hatch in April or May after a month of incubation. The larvae, which grow up to 4 millimetres (0.16 in) long, feed on the seeds and tissue of the cone before beginning to pupate in late summer.

As a control measure, insecticides can be applied to western redcedar cones in the spring. The larvae are often infected by parasitoid wasps of the family Chalcididae.
