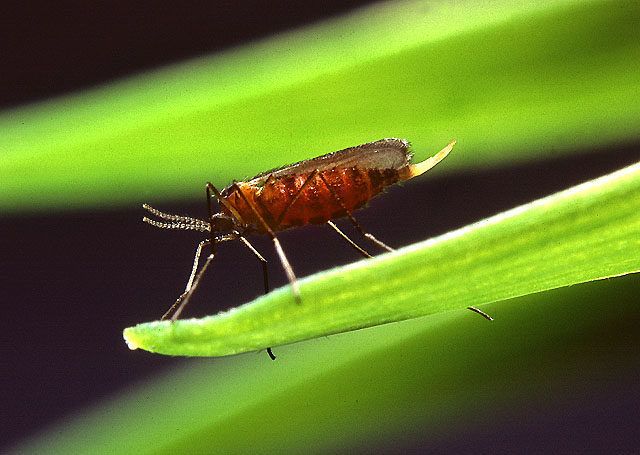
- Hessian fly (Mayetiola destructor)

Scientific classification
- Kingdom: Animalia
- Phylum: Arthropoda
- Clade: Pancrustacea
- Class: Insecta
- Order: Diptera
- Family: Cecidomyiidae
- Subfamily: Cecidomyiinae
- Supertribe: Lasiopteridi
- Tribe: Oligotrophini
- Genus: Mayetiola; Kieffer, 1896

Synonyms
- Caulomyia Rübsaamen, 1915; Chortomyia Kieffer, 1913; Mayetia Kieffer, 1896; Pemphigocecis Rübsaamen, 1915; Poomyia Rübsaamen, 1915

= Mayetiola =

Genus of flies

Mayetiola is a genus of flies in the family Cecidomyiidae. Most species are pests of cereal crops.

== Species ==
Contains:

- Mayetiola avenae (Marchal, 1895)
- Mayetiola bimaculata (Rübsaamen, 1895)
- Mayetiola dactylidis Kieffer, 1896
- Mayetiola destructor (Say, 1817)
- Mayetiola hellwigi (Rübsaamen, 1912)
- Mayetiola holci Kieffer, 1896
- Mayetiola hordei Kieffer, 1909
- Mayetiola joannisi Kieffer, 1896
- Mayetiola lanceolatae (Rübsaamen, 1895)
- Mayetiola moliniae (Rübsaamen, 1895)
- Mayetiola phalaris Barnes, 1928
- Mayetiola piceae Felt, 1926
- Mayetiola poae (Bosc, 1817)
- Mayetiola radicifica (Rübsaamen, 1895)
- Mayetiola thujae (Hedlin, 1959)
