= Mayetiola piceae =

Scientific classification
- Kingdom: Animalia
- Phylum: Arthropoda
- Class: Insecta
- Order: Diptera
- Family: Cecidomyiidae
- Genus: Mayetiola
- Species: M. piceae

Binomial name
- Mayetiola piceae Felt, 1926

Species of fly

Mayetiola piceae, the spruce gall midge, is a species of gall-forming flies in the Cecidomyiidae family.

An outbreak of spruce gall midge occurred in northern Alberta and adjacent areas in the Northwest Territories in 1992 (Brandt 2000). The infestation was widespread in white spruce stands, with 84% of surveyed sites infested and twig mortality as high as 81% among current-year shoots. Earlier, Rose and Lindquist (1985) had noted that severe injury to spruce is unusual, and had been recorded only from a number of locations in Yukon Territory. Levels of damage in the 1992 outbreak decreased at most sites in 1994, and by spring 1995 the outbreak had collapsed. About 15 million ha were affected at the peak. Other outbreaks have occurred in Yukon Territory in 1968 and 1969 (Tripp et al. 1970), in Connecticut in the early 1970s (Stephens 1985), and in New Brunswick and Nova Scotia in 1981 and 1982 (Magasi 1983). Typically, outbreaks have been localized and of short duration.

Spruce gall midges overwinter as orange larvae in galled current-year shoots (Felt 1926). Larvae are about 1.5 mm long when fully grown. The pupa is formed in the larval cell in early spring, often protruding from the cell before the adult emerges. Pupation usually occurs from mid-May to early June, and the 2-winged reddish-brown adult midge emerges through a conspicuous hole in the gall formed in the previous year's shoot. Mating occurs shortly thereafter, and eggs are laid on the newly developing shoots at the base of the needles (Smith 1952). As many as 100 larvae per shoot have been reported. Larvae bore immediately into the twig and form cells, the galls forming by the swelling of tissues surrounding the larval cells. Gall formation becomes noticeable within 10 days as a series of small, semi-globose swellings, which render the infected twig twice its normal diameter. Galled twigs usually remain on branches for several years.

According to data collected in 1993 and 1994 during an outbreak in Alberta and the Northwest Territories, galled current-year shoots caused by spruce gall midge displayed a negative binomial distribution described by the mean kp = 5.3333, the variance kpq = 83.0828, and the dispersion parameter k = 0.3007. The data were used to derive a sequential sampling plan for the classification of damage cause by spruce gall midge, of use to foresters and pest managers (Brandt 2000). Tiny parasitic wasps usually keep midge populations sufficiently in check to render control measures unnecessary.
