= Liparus =

- Liparus germanus

Scientific classification
- Kingdom: Animalia
- Phylum: Arthropoda
- Clade: Pancrustacea
- Class: Insecta
- Order: Coleoptera
- Suborder: Polyphaga
- Infraorder: Cucujiformia
- Superfamily: Curculionoidea
- Family: Curculionidae
- Subfamily: Molytinae
- Tribe: Molytini
- Genus: Liparus; Olivier, 1807

Genus of beetles

Liparus is a genus of weevils belonging to the subfamily Molytinae. The species of this genus are found in Europe.

== Species ==
The Curculionidae of the World Online project includes 15 species in two subgenera:

- Liparus subg. Liparus Olivier, 1807
  - Liparus (Liparus) baldensis Reitter, 1896
  - Liparus (Liparus) coronatus (Goeze, 1777)
  - Liparus (Liparus) dirus (Herbst, 1795)
  - Liparus (Liparus) engadinensis Reitter, 1897
  - Liparus (Liparus) germanus (Linnaeus, 1758)
  - Liparus (Liparus) glabrirostris Küster, 1849
  - Liparus (Liparus) grappensis Grandi, 1907
  - Liparus (Liparus) illyricus Gyllenhal, 1834
  - Liparus (Liparus) interruptus Magnano, 1955
  - Liparus (Liparus) laevigatus Gyllenhal, 1834
  - Liparus (Liparus) mariae Grandi, 1907
  - Liparus (Liparus) petrii Reitter, 1896
  - Liparus (Liparus) solarii Magnano, 1975
  - Liparus (Liparus) transsylvanicus Petri, 1895
- Liparus subg. Trysibius Schoenherr, 1842
  - Liparus (Trysibius) tenebrioides (Pallas, 1781)

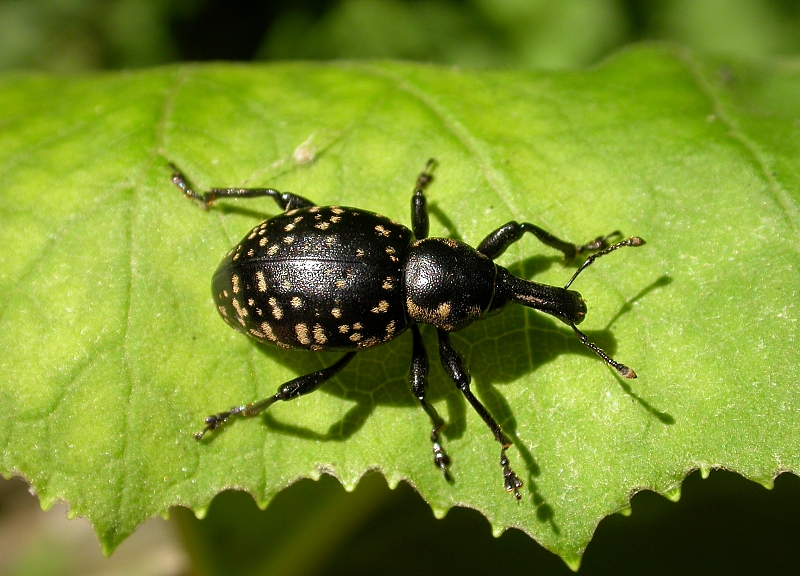
Liparus glabrirostris
