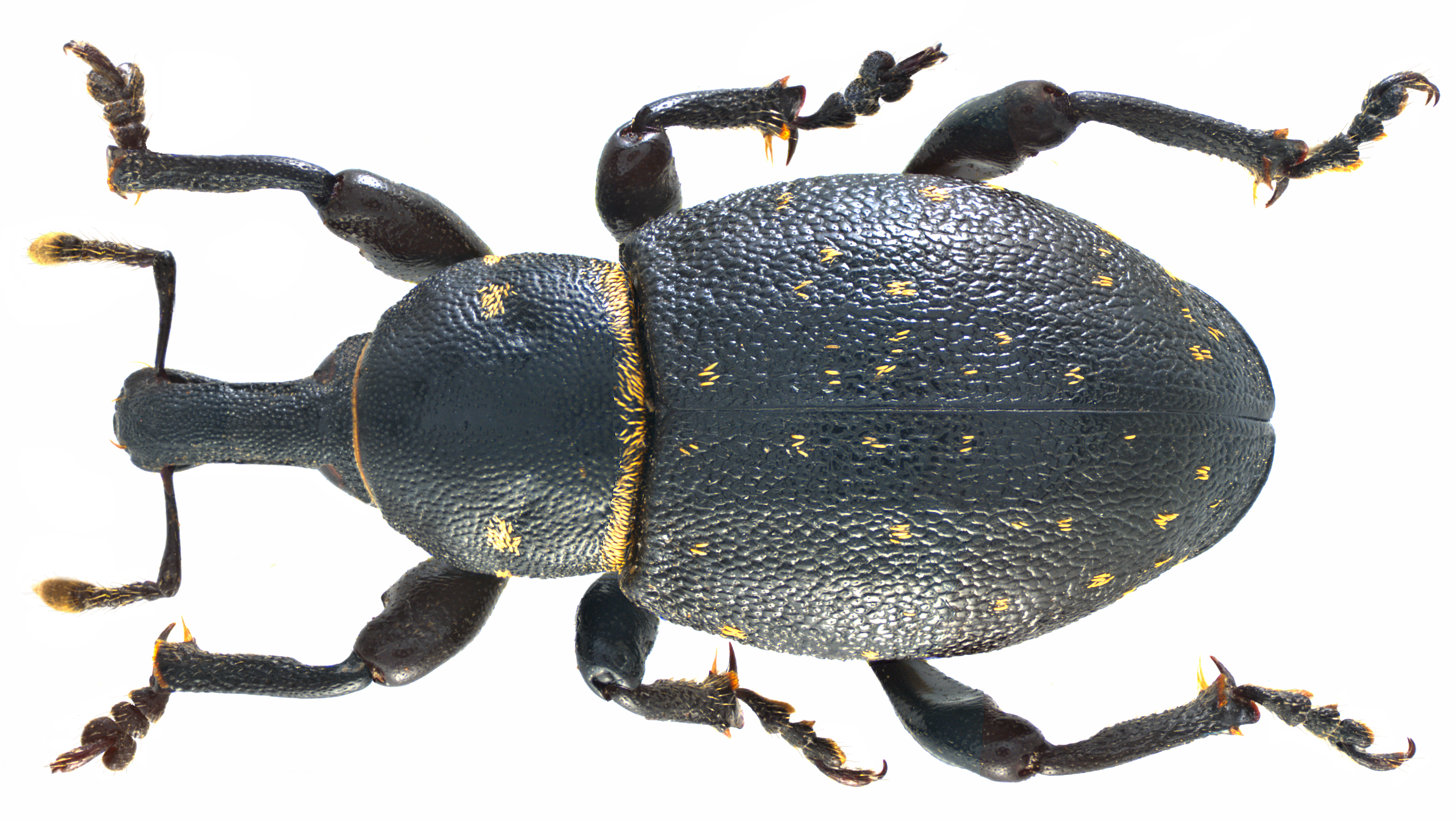

Scientific classification
- Kingdom: Animalia
- Phylum: Arthropoda
- Clade: Pancrustacea
- Class: Insecta
- Order: Coleoptera
- Suborder: Polyphaga
- Infraorder: Cucujiformia
- Superfamily: Curculionoidea
- Family: Curculionidae
- Genus: Liparus
- Species: L. coronatus

Binomial name
- Liparus coronatus (Goeze, 1777)

Synonyms
- Liparus (Liparus) coronatus (Goeze, 1777); Curculio coronatus Goeze, 1777; Liparus (Molytes) coronatus

= Liparus coronatus =

Species of beetle

Liparus coronatus is a species of beetles belonging to the family Curculionidae, native to Europe.

== Description ==
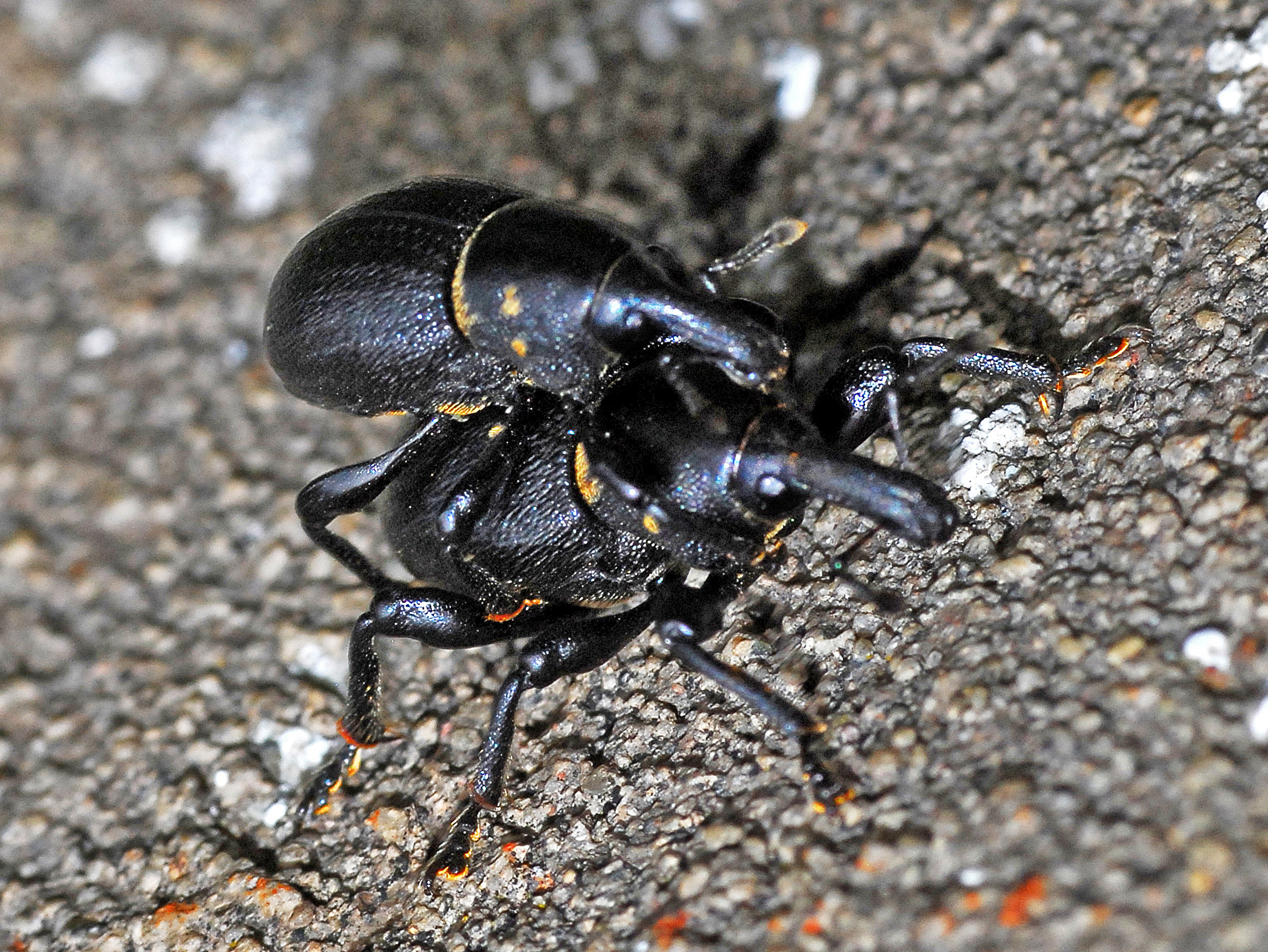
Liparus coronatus mating

Liparus coronatus can reach a body length of about 11–13 mm (0.43–0.51 in). These rather uncommon small weevils are almost completely shiny black. Pronotum is finely and densely punctured. The basal edge is lined with yellow scales throughout, with two large yellow scaly spots on each side. Femurs are strong and pointed.

== Biology ==
Adults of Liparus coronatus can be found from March to September. Larvae develop within rootstock. These weevils live on Apiaceae, mainly on chervil (Anthriscus sylvestris), Rough Chervil (Chaerophyllum temulum), wild carrot (Daucus species), Carrot (Daucus carota) and Pastinaca species.

== Bibliography ==
- Anderson, R., Nash, R., O’Connor, J.P. 2005. Checklist of Irish Coleoptera InvertebrateIreland Online, Ulster Museum, Belfast and National Museum of Ireland, Dublin
- Freude, H., Harde, K.W., & Lohse, G.A. (eds, 1981, 1983) Die Käfer Mitteleuropas. Band 10. Bruchidae, Anthribidae, Scolytidae, Platypodidae, Curculionidae. Band 11. Curculionidae II. Krefeld: Goecke & Evers.
- Hoffmann, A. (1950, 1954, 1958) Coléoptères curculionides. Parties I, II, III. Paris: Éditions Faune de France. Bibliothèque virtuelle numérique pdfs
- Host Plants of British Beetles: A List of Recorded Associations, Bullock, J.A., 1992
- Johnson, F.W & Halbert, J.N, 1902, A list of the Beetles of Ireland, Proceedings of the Royal Irish Academy, 6B: 535-827
- Morris, M.G. 1993, A Critical Review of the Weevils (Coleoptera, Curculionoidea) of Ireland and their Distribution., Proceedings of the Royal Irish Academy, 93B: 69-84
- True Weevils (Part I): Family Curculionidae, subfamilies Raymondionyminae to Smicronychinae, Morris, M.G., 2002
