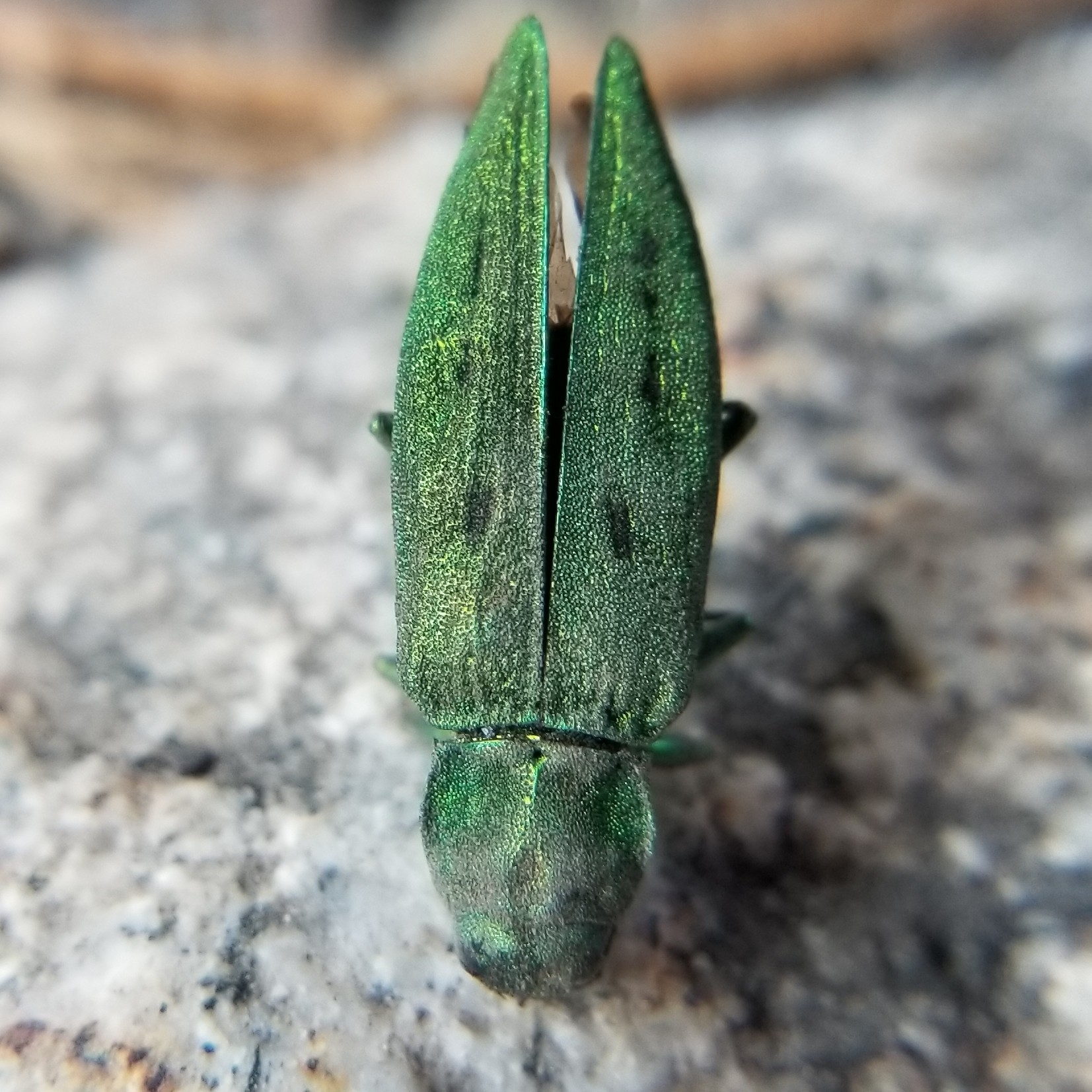
- Trachykele opulenta

Scientific classification
- Kingdom: Animalia
- Phylum: Arthropoda
- Class: Insecta
- Order: Coleoptera
- Suborder: Polyphaga
- Infraorder: Elateriformia
- Family: Buprestidae
- Tribe: Buprestini
- Genus: Trachykele; Marseul, 1865

= Trachykele =

Genus of beetles

Trachykele is a genus of beetles in the family Buprestidae, containing the following species:

- Trachykele blondeli Marseul, 1865
- Trachykele fattigi Knull, 1954
- Trachykele hartmani Burke, 1920
- Trachykele lecontei (Gory, 1841)
- Trachykele nimbosa Fall, 1906
- Trachykele opulenta Fall, 1906
