= Trachykele lecontei =

Scientific classification
- Domain: Eukaryota
- Kingdom: Animalia
- Phylum: Arthropoda
- Class: Insecta
- Order: Coleoptera
- Suborder: Polyphaga
- Infraorder: Elateriformia
- Family: Buprestidae
- Genus: Trachykele
- Species: T. lecontei

Binomial name
- Trachykele lecontei (Gory, 1841)

Species of beetle

Trachykele lecontei is a species of metallic wood-boring beetle in the family Buprestidae. It is found in North America.
