= Darius Kinsey =

American photographer (1869–1945)

Darius Kinsey (1869–1945) was a photographer active in western Washington state from 1890 to 1940. He is best known for his large-format images of loggers and phases of the region's lumber industry. He also photographed locomotives and landscapes and (especially early in his career) did studio work.

Kinsey, born in Maryville, Missouri, moved to Snoqualmie, Washington, where he took up photography in 1890.

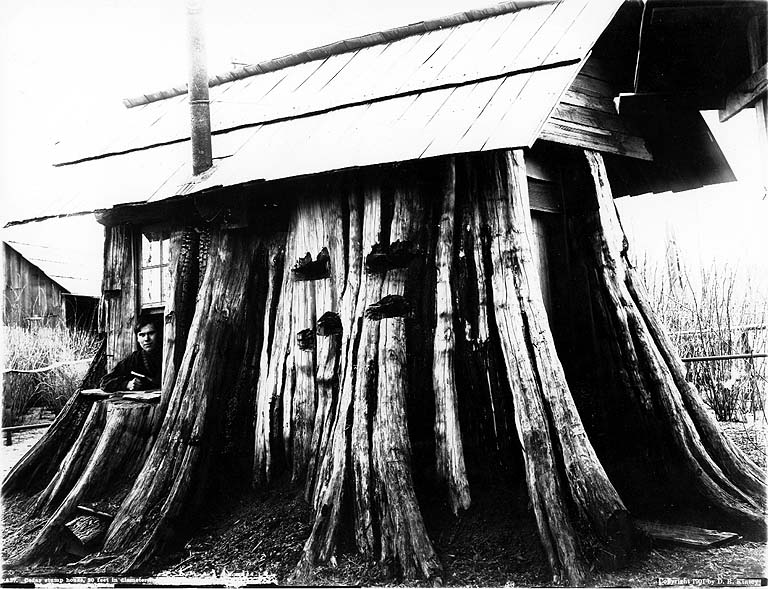
Cedar stump house, 1901

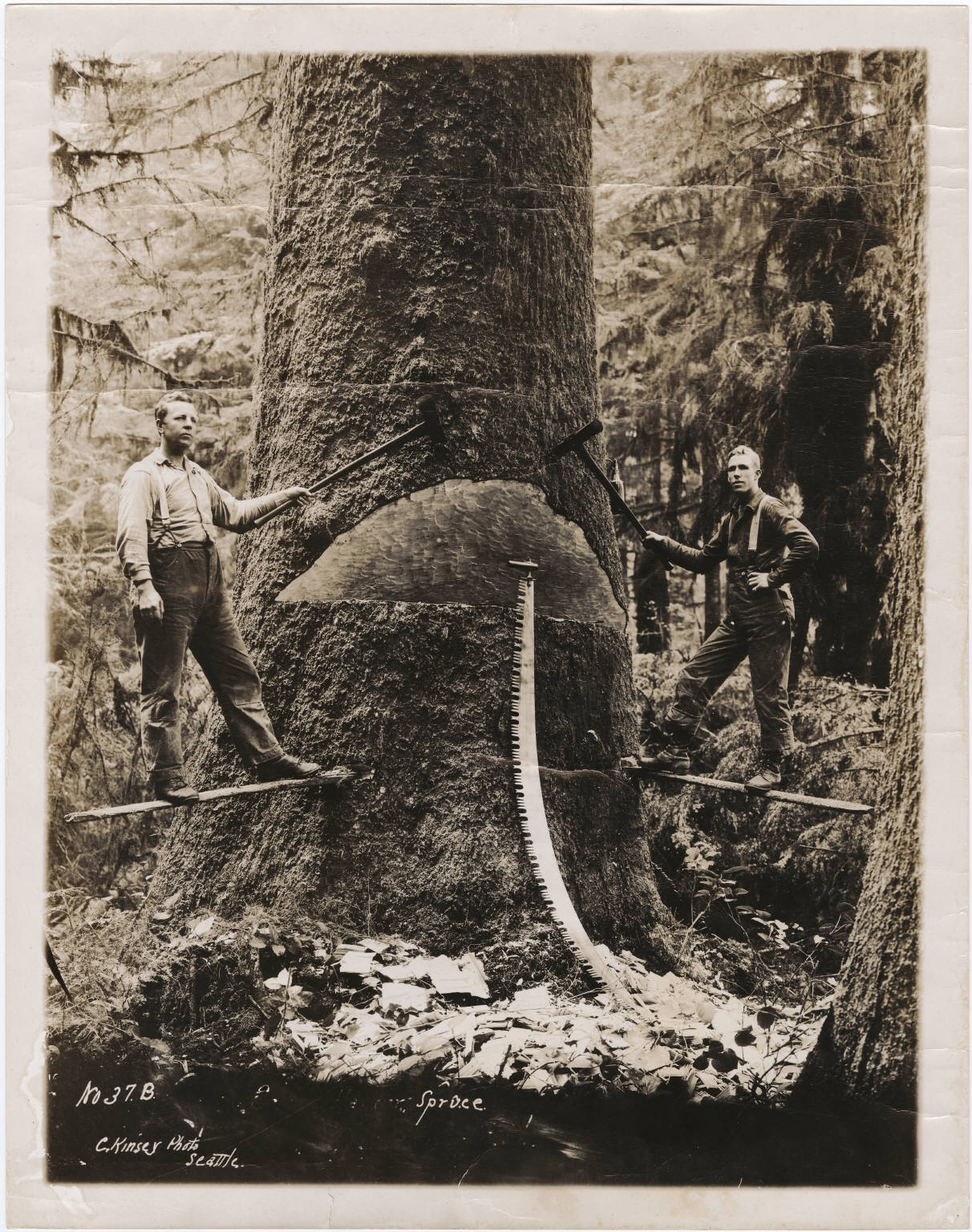
Spruce, c. 1906

He worked as an itinerant photographer for several years, until meeting Tabitha May Pritts at Nooksack, Washington. The couple married in 1896. The following year, they set up a photo studio in Sedro-Woolley, Washington. They had two children, Dorothea and Darius, Jr.

In 1906, the couple moved to Seattle. Darius gave up studio work and focused instead on the lumber industry and scenic photography. Tabitha developed the negatives and made the prints, which were sent back to the logging camps and sold to the loggers. Darius used an 11" X 14" Empire State view camera with a custom made tripod that could extend twelve feet high. He used glass plates until 1914, when he switched to film.

In 1920 Kinsey photographed the Giant Cedar Stump near Arlington.

After falling from a stump in October, 1940, Darius was forced to give up photography. He spent the last five years of his life sorting and organizing his negatives. He died in 1945 and is buried with his wife in Nooksack.

The major collection of his work is held by the Whatcom Museum in Bellingham, Washington. The University of Washington Libraries also has a collection of his work.

Darius' brother Clark Kinsey was also a photographer of early 20th Century logging in Washington.
