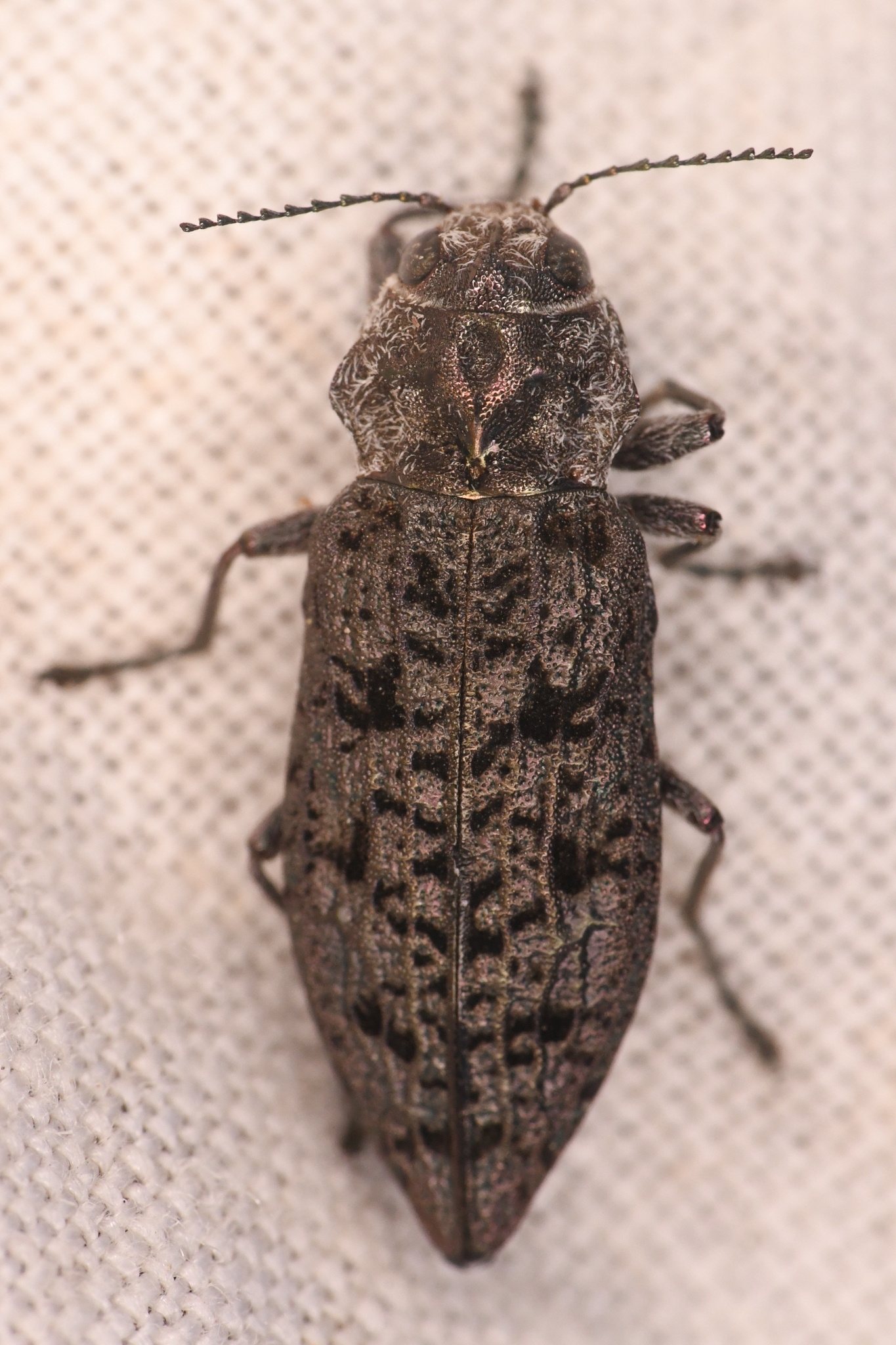

Scientific classification
- Domain: Eukaryota
- Kingdom: Animalia
- Phylum: Arthropoda
- Class: Insecta
- Order: Coleoptera
- Suborder: Polyphaga
- Infraorder: Elateriformia
- Family: Buprestidae
- Genus: Trachykele
- Species: T. nimbosa

Binomial name
- Trachykele nimbosa Fall, 1906

= Trachykele nimbosa =

Species of beetle

Trachykele nimbosa, the nimbose buprestid, is a species of metallic wood-boring beetle in the family Buprestidae. It is found in North America.
