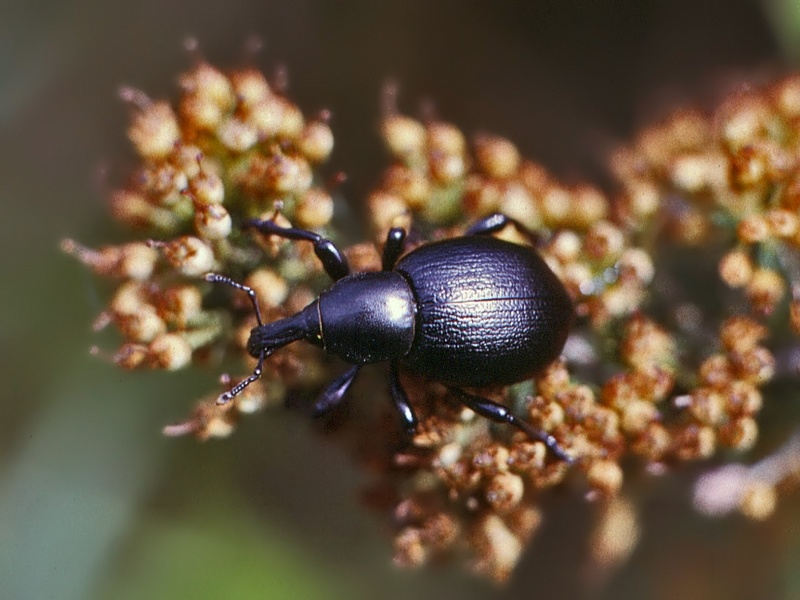

Scientific classification
- Kingdom: Animalia
- Phylum: Arthropoda
- Class: Insecta
- Order: Coleoptera
- Suborder: Polyphaga
- Infraorder: Cucujiformia
- Family: Curculionidae
- Genus: Liparus
- Species: L. dirus

Binomial name
- Liparus dirus (Herbst, 1795)

Synonyms
- Curculio dirus (Herbst, 1795)

= Liparus dirus =

Species of beetle

Liparus dirus is a species of weevil in the family Curculionidae, subfamily Molytinae.

It is mainly present in Austria, Bulgaria, Czech Republic, France, Germany, Italy, Poland, Romania, Slovenia and Spain.

Larvae and adults feed on Apiaceae species, mainly on Laserpitium latifolium, Laserpitium gallicum and Peucedanum cervaria. The adults grow up to 17–19 millimetres (0.67–0.75 in) long and can mostly be encountered from March through September.

The colour of this beetle is completely black, with the surface of elytra finely and densely dotted, without stains.

== Subspecies ==
- Liparus dirus var. punctatostriatus Bertolini, 1893
