= Clark Kinsey =

American photographer

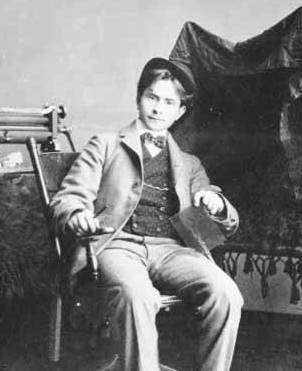
Clark Kinsey

Clark Kinsey (1877–1956) was a photographer from Snoqualmie, Washington. Kinsey concentrated on documentation of Washington State's forestry industry beginning at the turn of the 20th century, starting in 1913. His most productive period was in the 1920s and 1930s.

Clark and his brother Darius Kinsey were born in Grant Township, Nodaway County, Missouri, and spent their childhood in Snoqualmie, Washington as part of the first settler family household there. His brother Darius also worked in Washington; they divided the logging territory of Western Washington so that Clark worked south of Seattle and Darius north of the city.
