= Giant Cedar Stump =

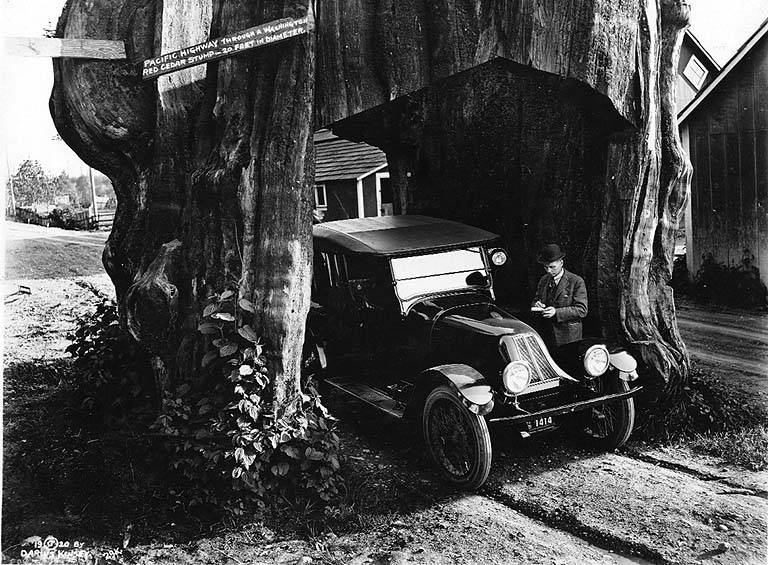
- "Relic of a Vanquished Forest"

- Location within Washington (state)
- 48°10′07.2″N 122°11′21.1″W

The Giant Cedar Stump is an ancient tree turned roadside attraction in Snohomish County, Washington.

== Natural history ==
The massive stump is the remain of an old-growth Thuja plicata giant arborvitae, known as the western redcedar.

== Roadside attraction ==
The stump was photographed by Darius Kinsey in 1920 as part of his series on the lumber industry in the Pacific Northwest.

In 1939 Crown Prince Olav and Princess Märtha of Norway drove through the stump on their way to nearby Stanwood for the dedication of a memorial to Washington's first Norwegian settlers.
