= Gastrotaphrus =

Scientific classification
- Domain: Eukaryota
- Kingdom: Animalia
- Phylum: Arthropoda
- Class: Insecta
- Order: Coleoptera
- Suborder: Polyphaga
- Infraorder: Cucujiformia
- Family: Curculionidae
- Tribe: Molytini
- Genus: Gastrotaphrus; Buchanan, 1936

Genus of beetles

Gastrotaphrus is a genus of true weevils in the beetle family Curculionidae. There is one described species in Gastrotaphrus, G. barberi.
