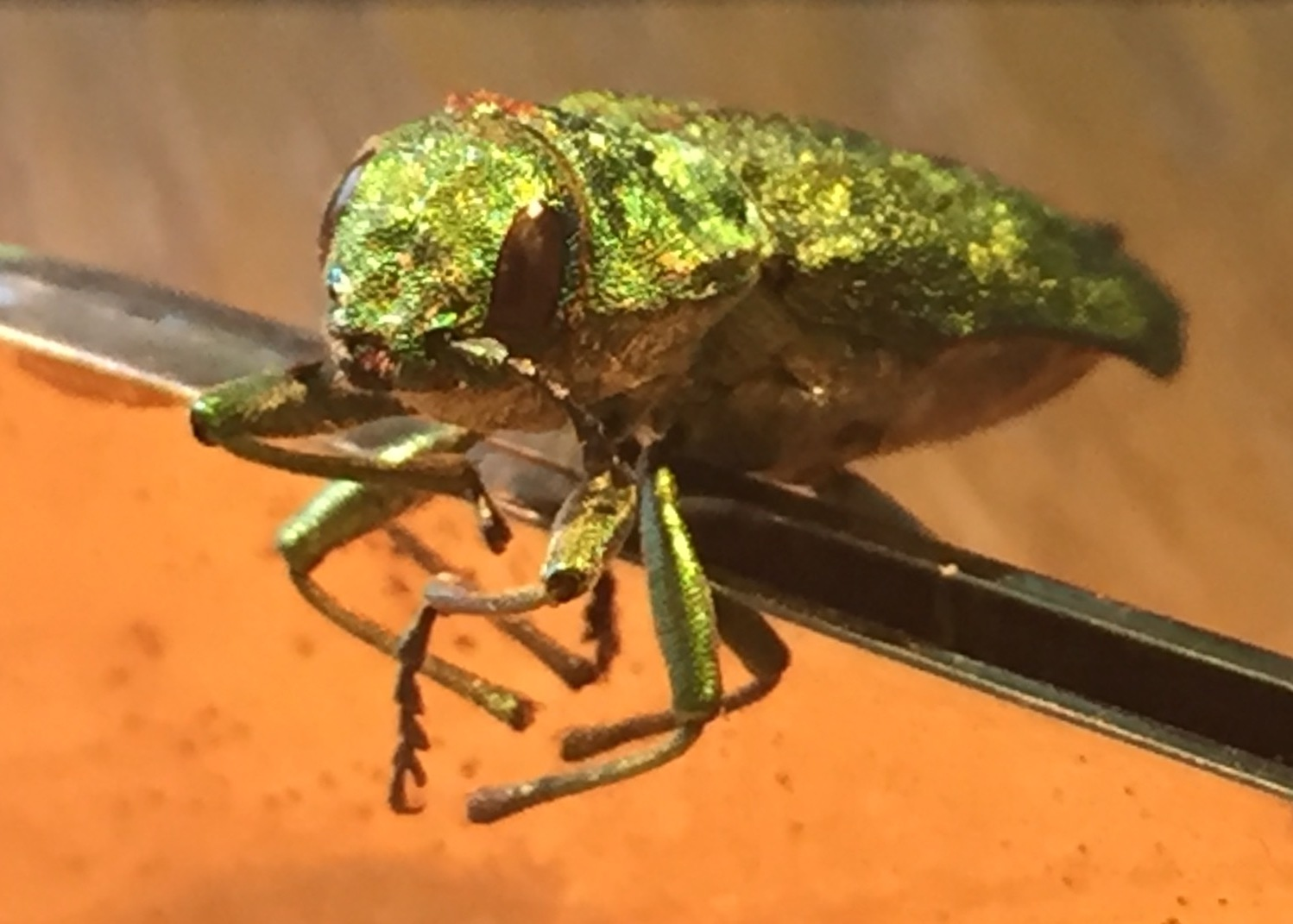

Scientific classification
- Domain: Eukaryota
- Kingdom: Animalia
- Phylum: Arthropoda
- Class: Insecta
- Order: Coleoptera
- Suborder: Polyphaga
- Infraorder: Elateriformia
- Family: Buprestidae
- Genus: Trachykele
- Species: T. blondeli

Binomial name
- Trachykele blondeli Marseul, 1865

= Trachykele blondeli =

Species of beetle

Trachykele blondeli is a species in the family Buprestidae ("metallic wood-boring beetles"), in the order Coleoptera ("beetles"). Common names include "western cedar borer", "powder worm beetle" and "western red cedar borer". They live in Central America and North America.
