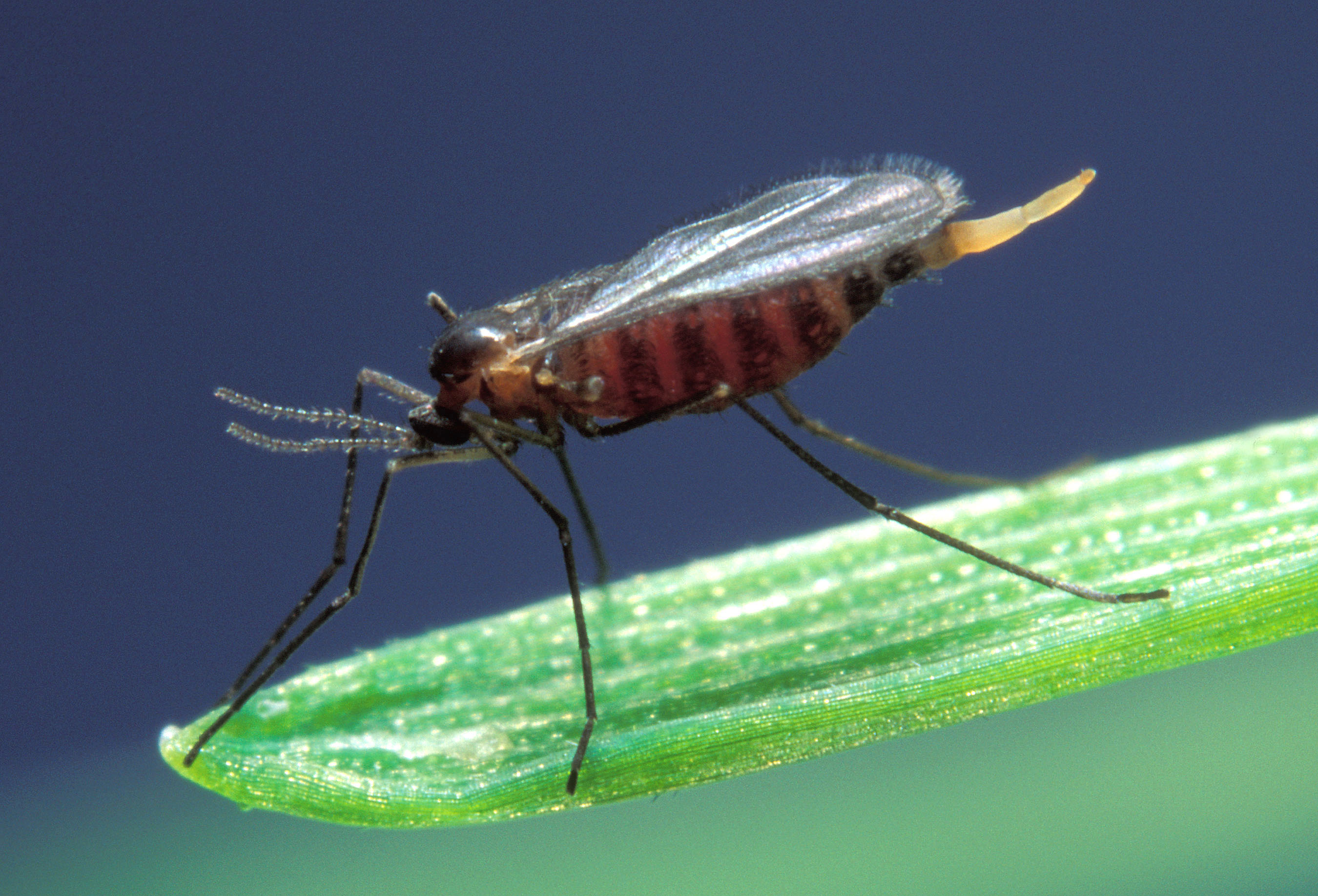

Scientific classification
- Kingdom: Animalia
- Phylum: Arthropoda
- Class: Insecta
- Order: Diptera
- Family: Cecidomyiidae
- Genus: Mayetiola
- Species: M. destructor

Binomial name
- Mayetiola destructor (Say, 1817)

Synonyms
- Cecidomyia destructor Say, 1817; Cecidomyia culmicola Morris, 1849; Cecidomyia frumentaria Rondani, 1864; Cecidomyia secalina Loew, 1859; Mayetiola orientalis Bollow, 1955; Mayetiola secalis Bollow, 1955; Phytophaga cerealis Rondani, 1843; Rhabdophaga elymi Felt, 1909; Rhabdophaga pratensis Felt, 1908

= Hessian fly =

Species of fly

The Hessian fly (Mayetiola destructor), or barley midge, is a species of fly that is a significant pest of cereal crops, including wheat, barley and rye. Though a native of Asia, upon its discovery it was believed to have been transported into North America in the straw bedding of Hessian troops during the American Revolution (1775–1783), thus the origin of its common name. However, the report of an inquiry made in 1788 by Sir Joseph Banks states that "no such insect could be found to exist in Germany or any other part of Europe". Nonetheless, it appears that this species, or one exactly like it in habits, had been known for at least a century prior to the American Revolution from a locality near Geneva, and also for a long time from some regions in France.

The Hessian fly was described by Thomas Say in 1817. It is a very harmful insect. It mainly attacks the stem, although if it is especially hungry it will eat any part of the plant it can find.

In 1836, a severe infestation of Hessian flies resulted in a crop shortage aggravating the financial problems of farmers prior to the Panic of 1837.

== Distribution ==
M. destructor is believed to have originated in the Fertile Crescent of the Middle East, parasitizing wild grass species of the tribe Triticeae. With the global development of agriculture, particularly of wheat, it is now present in throughout Europe, North Africa, North America, and New Zealand.

== Appearance ==
Hessian fly eggs are tiny and elliptical, being most easily recognized by their distinctive orange color. Larvae resemble white cylindrical grubs similar to other members of the family Cecidomyiidae. As they age, larvae also develop a translucent green stripe down the center of the back. There are three larval instars, each varying in size. Individuals between the first and second instars can widely differ in size, with larvae doubling in size from the first instar (0.56-1.70 mm) to the second (1.70-4.00 mm). Pupae develop within the cuticle of the second instar, known as the puparium. This stage is also called the flax-seed stage, as the hard, sclerotized, dark-brown cuticle the larva develops within resembles a seed of flax. Adult flies are brown or black. Females can sometimes be distinguished more easily due to their occasional reddish-brown coloring, a product of the eggs developing within the abdomen.

== Life cycle ==
The Hessian fly is a short-lived gall-forming insect, living for around 30 days. Typically, multiple generations of the fly are seen, although the exact number of generations depends largely on region and its associated climate. For example, in the Coastal Plains region of Georgia and South Carolina, five to six total generations can be observed in a year; two in fall, one in winter, and one or two in spring. Females lay up to 200 eggs on wheat, but will lay on other cereals, such as oats and barley, albeit in smaller clutches. Eggs are most commonly laid and found in grooves on the upper side of the leaf blade in a host plant. Oviposition sites are carefully chosen through chemical, visual, and tactile cues, taking into account intrinsic factors that could maximize survival of offspring, such as number and depth of vascular grooves on the leaf surface.

After hatching, first-instar larvae migrate down to the leaf base, where they feed by attacking the abaxial surface of the sheath on the plant's youngest leaves. Feeding lasts between 2–3 weeks over two instars, with five-day old larva consuming the greatest amount of plant fluid. The second instar is largely immobile, lacking the creeping pads of the first stage. Following feeding, larvae enter the third instar/pupal stage, which can last between 7–35 days. Eclosure, or emergence, can be delayed if environmental conditions are not ideal, with pupae entering either aestivation or diapause if conditions are too warm or too cold respectively.

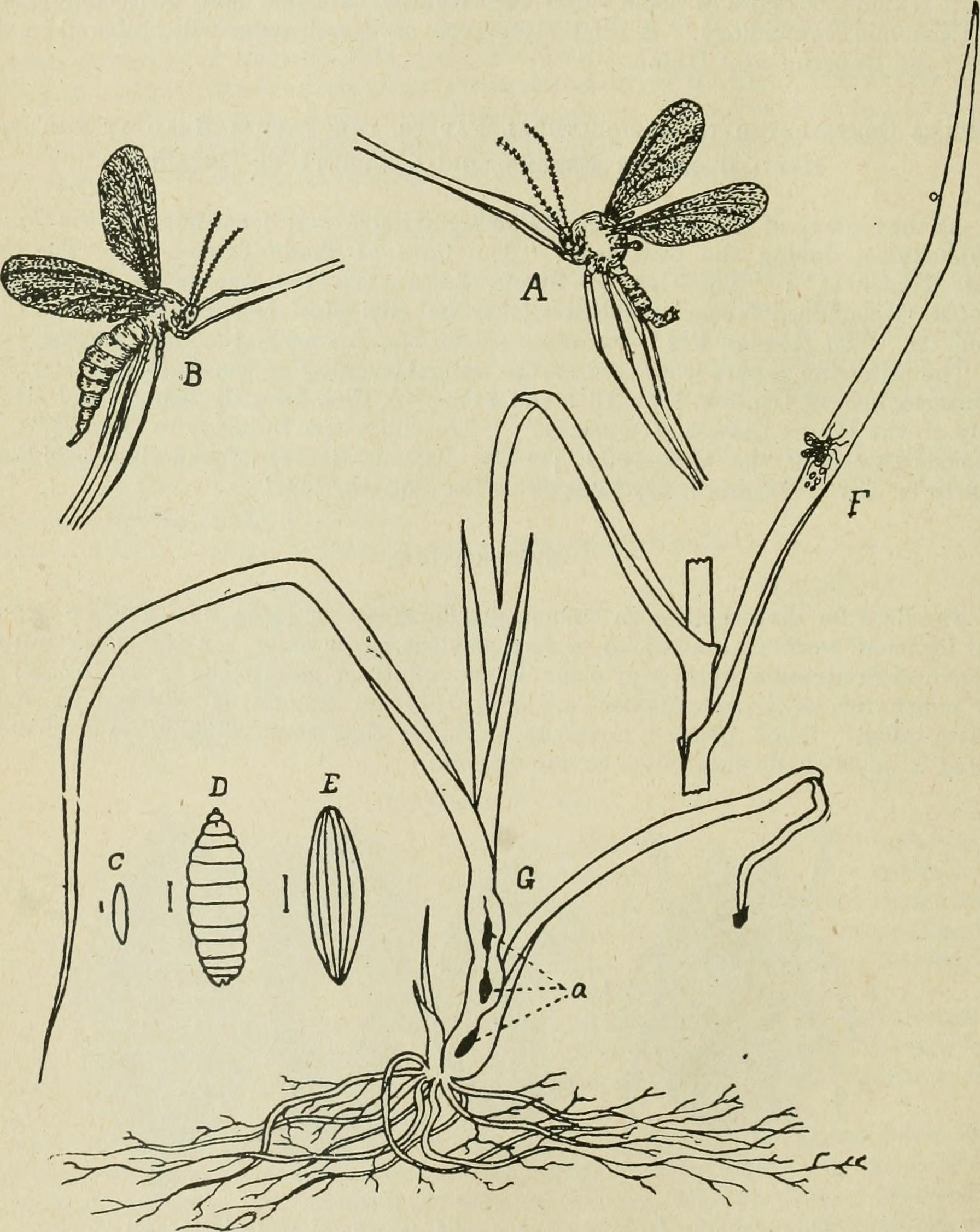
Illustration of adults, egg, larva, pupa, oviposition and galls in a wheat plant

Adults are the short-lived stage of life, lasting only 1–4 days. During this time, females mate and oviposit on host plants.

== Feeding ==
The larvae of M. destructor feed on the nutritive tissue of cereal plants. This tissue is created by the interaction of specialized enzymes in the insect's saliva with cells in the epidermis and mesophyll of the plant, causing organelles to break down and rupture. Larvae also have paired mandibles that act similarly to nematode stylets, puncturing tiny holes in the epidermal wall where food can be accessed.

Like in other plant-feeding cecidomyiid species, larvae have a simplified digestive system that allows for extra-intestinal digestion. Lytic enzymes, present within the midgut via holocriny, act along with salivary secretions to break down complex cellulose-based plant materials into liquid sugars and proteins, which are then easily consumed by the larva. While it primarily serves the purpose of transforming food into a usable form for the larva, this special combination of chemicals also produces a wide range of effects in the host plant, the exact scope of which is unknown. One such effect is carbon/nitrogen shift. As the plant interacts with the saliva of the larva, avirulence (Avr) genes in the saliva match up with similarly structured genes in the host that coordinate plant defense. The resulting gene-to-gene compatibility causes changes in numerous metabolic processes, such as glycolysis and amino-acid synthesis, leading to free-containing carbon compounds being directed away from the plant and leached out as a liquid. These interactions can cause up to a 36% loss of free-carbon compounds and a 46% increase of free-containing nitrogen compounds.

== Host defense ==
M. destructor is one of the most destructive wheat pests worldwide, hence its name. This has brought it much attention from wheat breeders and genetics researchers. As a result, the highest number of mapped R genes for resistance to insects in wheat are R genes for this pest specifically, with the unrelated Russian wheat aphid (Diuraphis noxia) also being of serious interest.
