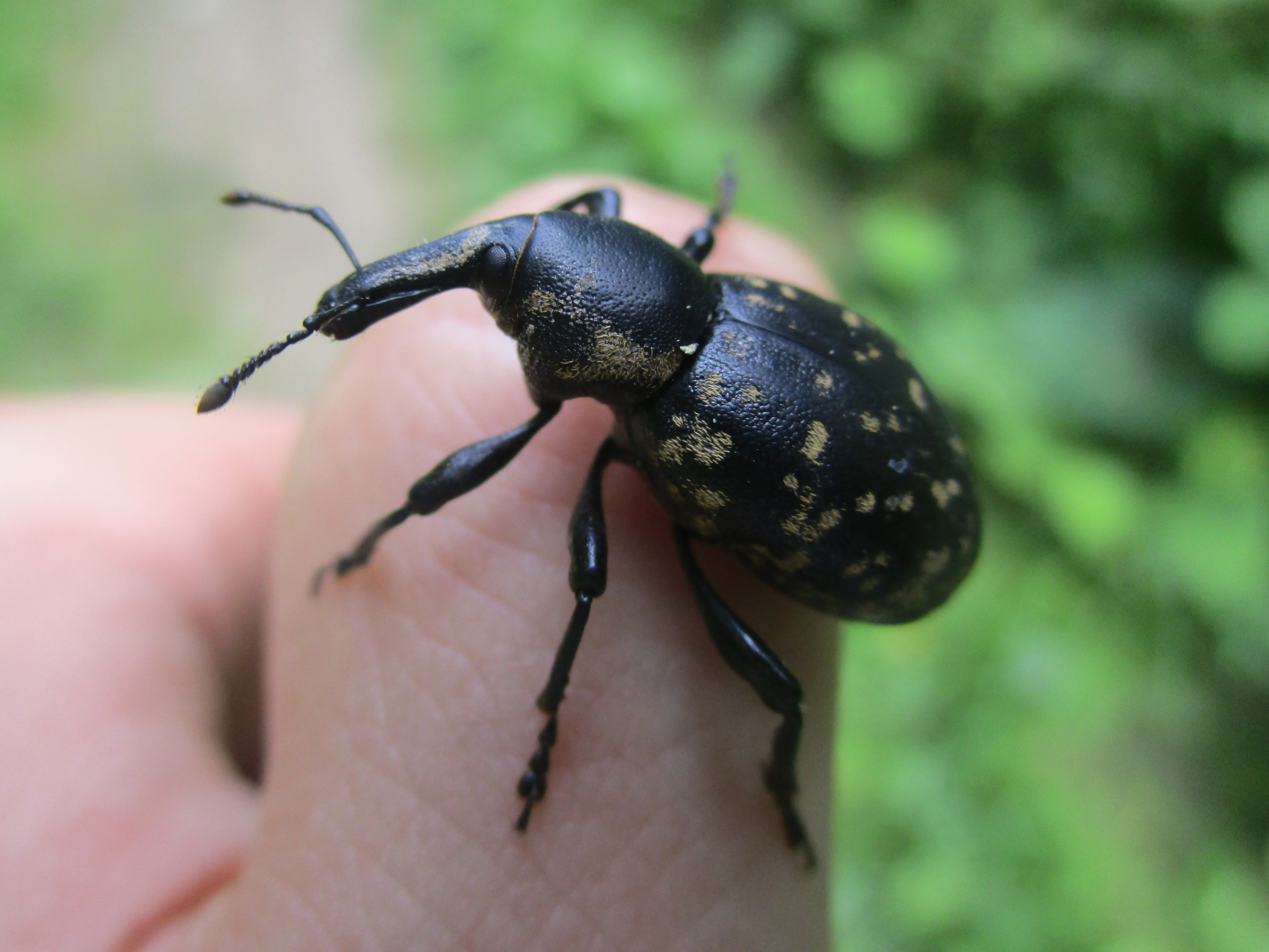

Scientific classification
- Kingdom: Animalia
- Phylum: Arthropoda
- Clade: Pancrustacea
- Class: Insecta
- Order: Coleoptera
- Suborder: Polyphaga
- Infraorder: Cucujiformia
- Superfamily: Curculionoidea
- Family: Curculionidae
- Genus: Liparus
- Species: L. glabrirostris

Binomial name
- Liparus glabrirostris (Küster, 1849)

= Liparus glabrirostris =

Species of weevil

Liparus glabrirostris, the butterbur weevil, is a western Palaearctic species of weevil belonging to the subfamily Molytinae, named after its larvae's most common genus of host plants, butterburs.

When threatened, it can exhibit apparent death, becoming temporarily unresponsive.

== Description ==
Butterbur weevils are one of the largest weevil species in Europe, with the adult weevils reaching an approximate size of 14–19 mm (0.55–0.75 in) in length. They are dark black with irregular patches of light brown spots on the abdomen and thorax. Less noticeable light brown hairs can also be found on the legs and head.

== Habitat ==
This species is characteristic to high altitude riparian woodland zones in the mountains of Europe.

== Distribution ==
The butterbur weevil is native to Central Europe, from Spain to Ukraine. The species is most commonly observed in the Alpine and Tatra mountain range, and in the Bohemian Massif.
