= Steremnius carinatus =

Scientific classification
- Kingdom: Animalia
- Phylum: Arthropoda
- Class: Insecta
- Order: Coleoptera
- Suborder: Polyphaga
- Infraorder: Cucujiformia
- Family: Curculionidae
- Genus: Steremnius
- Species: S. carinatus

Binomial name
- Steremnius carinatus (Boheman, 1842)

Species of beetle

Steremnius carinatus, the conifer seedling weevil, is a species of true weevil in the beetle family Curculionidae.
