= Choquette =

Choquette may refer to:

- Choquette (surname)
- Choquette (avocado), a commercial avocado cultivar that originated in Florida
- Choquette Hot Springs Provincial Park - A provincial park in British Columbia, Canada
- Choquette River, a tributary of the Stikine River in British Columbia, named for Buck Choquette
  - Choquette Glacier, the source of that river
  - Mount Choquette, a mountain in the same area

== See also ==
- Chouquette, a French Choux pastry
