= Maluma (disambiguation) =

Maluma (born 1994) is a Colombian reggaeton singer.

Maluma may also refer to:

- Maluma (avocado), a commercial cultivar of avocado
- Maluma, a test word of the bouba/kiki effect

== People with the surname ==
- Alfred Leonhard Maluma (1955–2021), Tanzanian Roman Catholic bishop
- Larry Maluma, Zambian-Australian reggae artist

== See also ==
- Malouma
