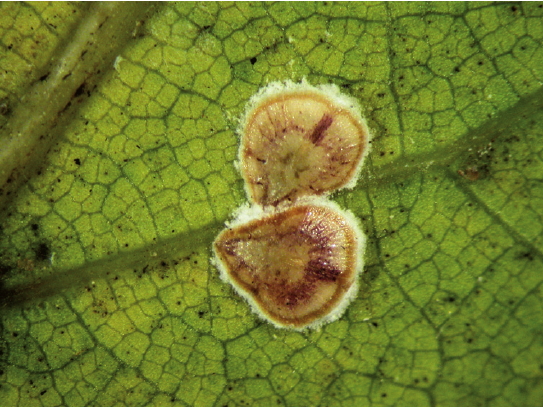
- Protopulvinaria pyriformis (Coccidae) on a leaf

Scientific classification
- Kingdom: Animalia
- Phylum: Arthropoda
- Class: Insecta
- Order: Hemiptera
- Suborder: Sternorrhyncha
- Family: Coccidae
- Genus: Protopulvinaria
- Species: P. pyriformis

Binomial name
- Protopulvinaria pyriformis Cockerell, 1894

= Protopulvinaria pyriformis =

Species of insect (pyriform scale)

Protopulvinaria pyriformis, commonly known as the pyriform scale, is a species of soft scale insect in the family Coccidae. It is a pest of avocado and is found in many countries around the world where avocados grow.

== Description ==
The adult female pyriform scale is pear-shaped or heart-shaped, about 3 mm (0.12 in) in length, and is protected by a reddish-brown scale with radial stripes. In mature individuals, the scale hardens and the fluffy white ovisac projects slightly from underneath the scale. Male individuals are not known in South Africa, but have been observed in Florida. The nymphs are pale green, flat and oval, and the eggs are pale yellow.

== Distribution ==
The pyriform scale is known from Australia, South Africa, Israel, Italy, France, Spain, Cuba, Florida, and Peru. It is normally found on avocado, and in Peru it is said to be the worst insect pest of avocado, but in Spain it has also been found on citrus. Certain cultivars of avocado seem more susceptible to attack than others.

== Life cycle ==
The mature adult female produces a batch of two to three hundred eggs, by parthenogenesis in most populations, and stores them in her ovisac until they hatch. The first instar nymph is known as a crawler and moves away from the mother scale. After about 10 days it becomes a second instar, and after a further 17 days, a third instar. After another 25 days, this becomes an immature adult, a stage that lasts for about 28 days, after which the mature adult starts to produce eggs and lives for about 45 days. Unlike most soft scale insects, the female of this species is able to move around. There are two generations per year in South Africa and in Israel.

== Damage ==
Both adults and nymphs feed by sucking sap from the host plant. The main damage done by this pest is as a result of the copious amounts of honeydew it secretes. Sooty mould grows on this and photosynthesis is reduced, the plant is weakened, leaves may fall, shoots dry up and fruits may be reduced in size and number.
