= World Avocado Congress =

The World Avocado Congress (WAC) is a quadrennial meeting of avocado producers, researchers, marketers and other interested parties from several countries, for the purpose of information sharing and networking.

== History ==
The congress was founded by Jan Toerien. The first WAC was held in Johannesburg, South Africa in 1987. During the planning session for the second WAC in 1991 Dr. Mary-Lu Arpaia, a researcher from the University of California Riverside, proposed that an International Avocado Society (IAS) be formed and charged with the responsibility of organizing the WAC every four years. It was accepted by vote and the IAS was formed, with representatives from different countries selected for its initial organizing committee. At the first meeting of these representatives on 26 April 1991, Hank Brokaw and Dr. Arpaia was elected as co-chairs.

=== List of Congresses ===
Congress	Dates	Location	President(s)
I	May 1987	Johannesburg, South Africa	Jan Toerien
II	21–26 April 1991	Orange, California	Hank Brokaw
III	22–27 October 1995	Tel Aviv, Israel	Amos Blumenfeld
IV	1999	Mexico	Daniel Teliz
V	2003	Málaga, Spain	Fernando Pliego-Alfaro
VI	2007	Viña del Mar, Chile	Monica Castro
VII	2011	Cairns, Australia	Antony Allen
VIII	13–18 September 2015	Lima, Peru	James Bosworth Crovetto
IX	24–26 September 2019	Medellín, Colombia	
X	2–5 April 2023	Auckland, New Zealand	
XI	6-9 September 2027	Cape Town, South Africa	
