= Maluma (avocado) =

Avocado cultivar

Persea americana Mill. cv. 'Maluma'
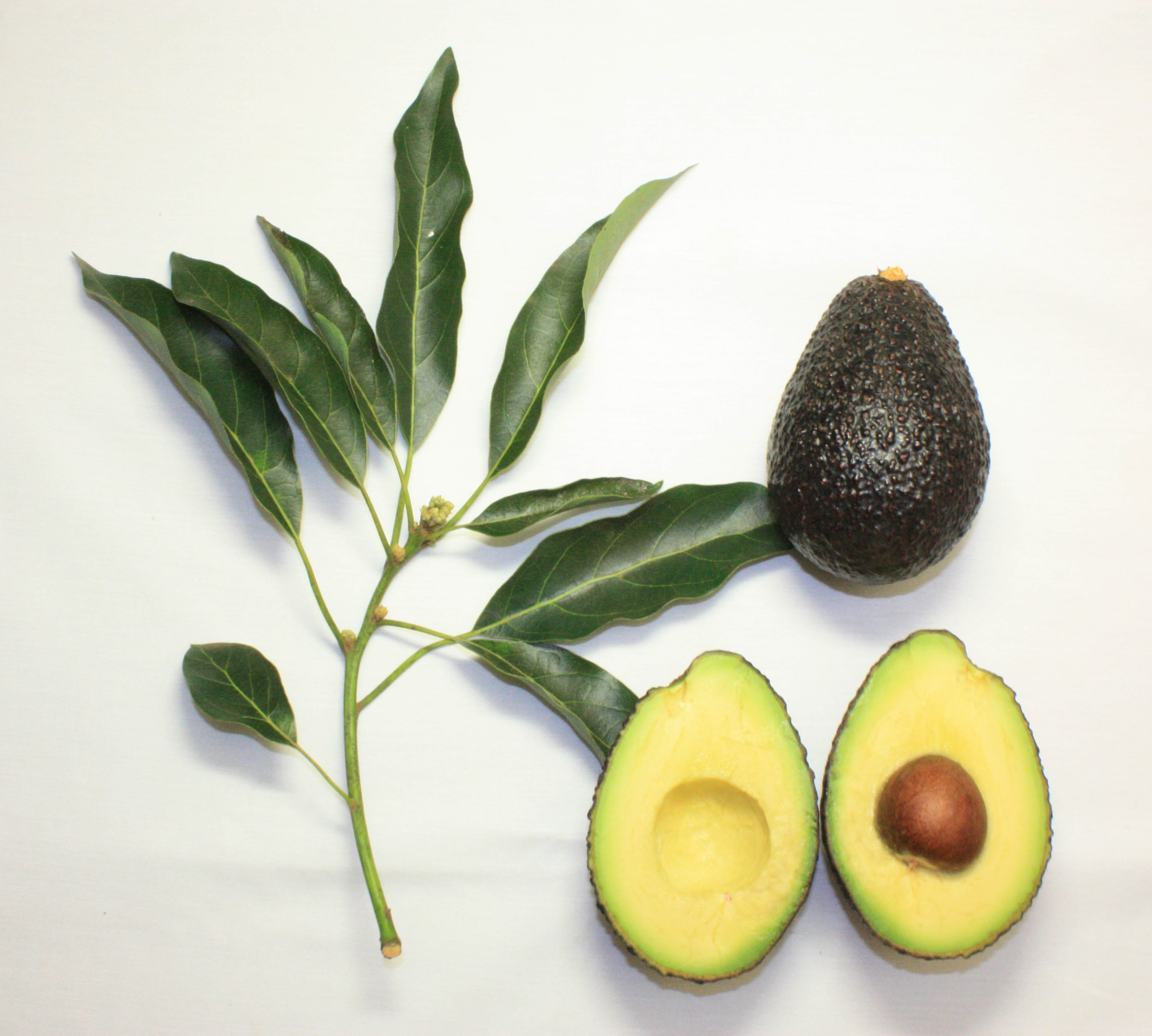
- Cultivar: 'Maluma'
- Origin: Discovered on the farm 'Maluma' of Mr. Dries Joubert in Levubu, South Africa in the early 1990s. It is a chance seedling of unknown parentage.

Maluma (Persea Americana Mill. cv. 'Maluma') is a commercial cultivar of avocado that was discovered in South Africa. It is marketed simply as 'Maluma', but sometimes also as 'Maluma Hass', referring to its similarity in appearance to the well-known Hass cultivar. Its name originated from the fact that it was discovered by Mr. Dries Joubert, a farmer from Levubu in South Africa, on his farm 'Maluma'.

Maluma is considered a large fruit with individual fruit weights ranging from 150 gram to 400 gram, with most fruit being in the 250 to 300 gram range. It is known as a black-skinned avocado cultivar due to the dark purple-black colour of the skin when ripe.

== History ==
Maluma was discovered by Mr. A.G. (Dries) Joubert on his farm 'Maluma' in the Levubu region in northern South Africa in the early 1990s. Maluma was noted by Joubert due to its proportionally larger fruit, precociousness and high yield compared to the regular 'Hass' trees in his commercially cultivated orchard.

Joubert approached Allesbeste Nursery in South Africa, an avocado nursery specialising in reproducing avocado trees asexually using a proprietary method called micro-cloning, in the latter part of the 1990s to investigate the uniqueness and commercial viability of the observed avocado fruit. Allesbeste Nursery then proceeded with semi-commercial field trials and found the fruit to be sufficiently unique and commercially viable as a new avocado cultivar. Until this point the fruit was referred to informally as 'Dries Hass' (from Joubert's first name) and sold simply as 'Hass'. Allesbeste Nursery proceeded to formally name the cultivar Maluma after the farm where it was discovered and also applied and was granted a plant breeders' right in South Africa on 7 November 2004. It was granted full export status under its own name by South African authorities in 2006, after which it was revealed to the international avocado world at the VI World Avocado Congress held in Viña del Mar, Chile, in 2007. Maluma has subsequently been planted in most avocado producing regions of the world and has been granted registered plant protection in most of those countries, while pending in others.

== Botanical characteristics ==
Maluma was discovered as a chance seedling and because it did not originate from a breeding program, the parentage of the cultivar is unknown. However, it appears to be related to Guatemalan varieties with some Mexican gene characteristics. Maluma trees produce A-type flowers. The tree is a slow, upright grower while being precocious. It has an axial-irregular branching habit. The fruit are of a pyriform shape with weights ranging from 150 gram to 400 gram, peaking at 250 to 300 gram with an asymmetrical pedicel. The fruit are green when unripe and turn dark purple-black when ripe. The fruit skin is rough and pebbly.

Botanical characteristics illustrated
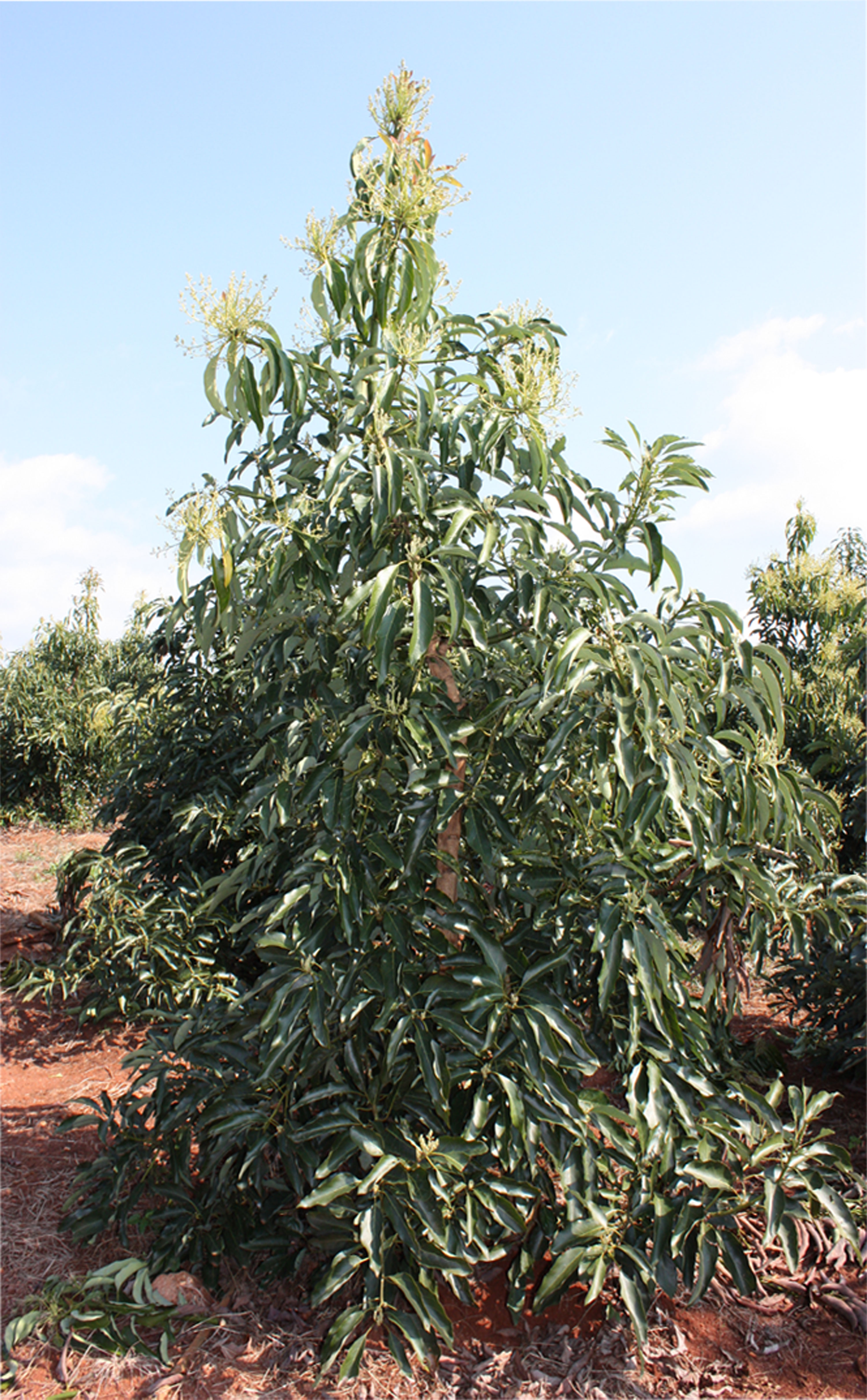
An unpruned Maluma tree. Notice the upright growth and central leader tendency.

== Suitability for high density cultivation ==
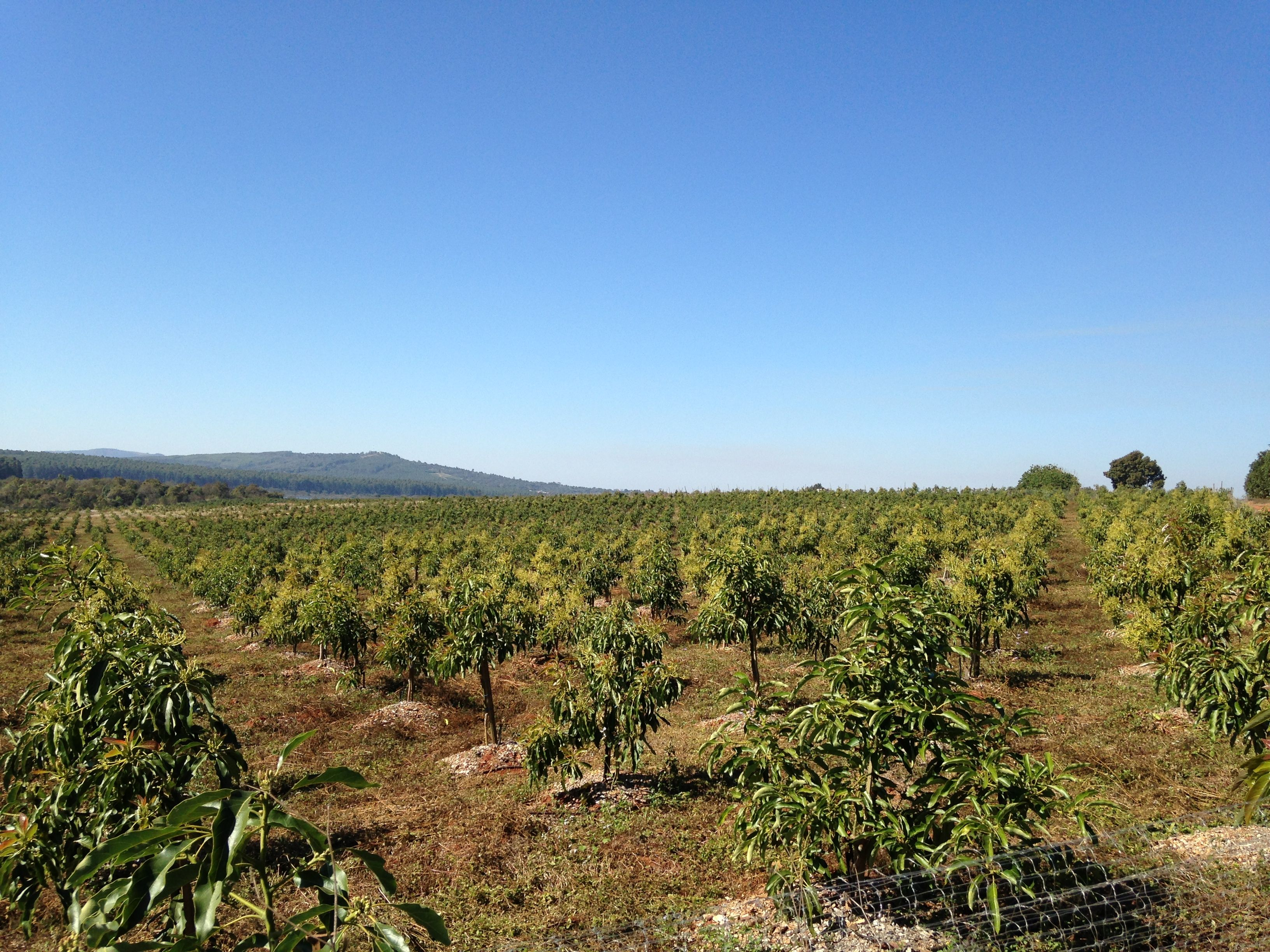
High density Maluma orchard in South Africa, planted 2.5m x 2.5m

Maluma trees tend to grow slower and therefore more compact compared to 'Hass' trees. Together with its ease of pruning and relatively high yield potential, this makes it well suited for high density cultivation practices.
