= Lula (avocado) =

Avocado cultivar

Avocado 'Lula'
- Genus: Persea
- Species: P. americana
- Cultivar: 'Lula'
- Origin: Florida

The 'Lula' avocado (Persea americana 'Lula') is an avocado cultivar that originated in South Florida.

'Lula' became a widely propagated avocado after its introduction due to favorable characteristics, including its eating qualities.

== History ==
The original tree reportedly grew from a 'Taft' avocado seed – named after Charles Parkman Taft (1856–1934) – planted in 1915 on the property of nurseryman George B. Cellon in Miami, Florida, and was named after Cellon's wife, Lula Cellon. DNA analysis has indicated 'Lula' was likely the result of a cross between Guatemalan and Mexican type avocados. The tree first fruited in 1919 and was recognized for its excellent eating qualities. Propagation of 'Lula' began in 1921.

'Lula' became recognized for its excellent eating qualities, steady production, and cold hardiness. It did have a drawback, however, in that the fruit was susceptible to scab. 'Lula' was widely propagated both for the commercial trade and home growing. It continues to be sold on a large scale despite the availability of newer cultivars, and it is often used as a rootstock for grafted avocado trees.

'Lula' trees are planted in the collections of the USDA's germplasm repository in Miami, Florida.

== Description ==
'Lula' fruit has a glossy green skin and is pear-shaped. The flesh has high oil content, around 12–16%. The fruit matures from October to February in Florida. 'Lula' produces A-type flowers.

== Gallery: Taft avocado ==
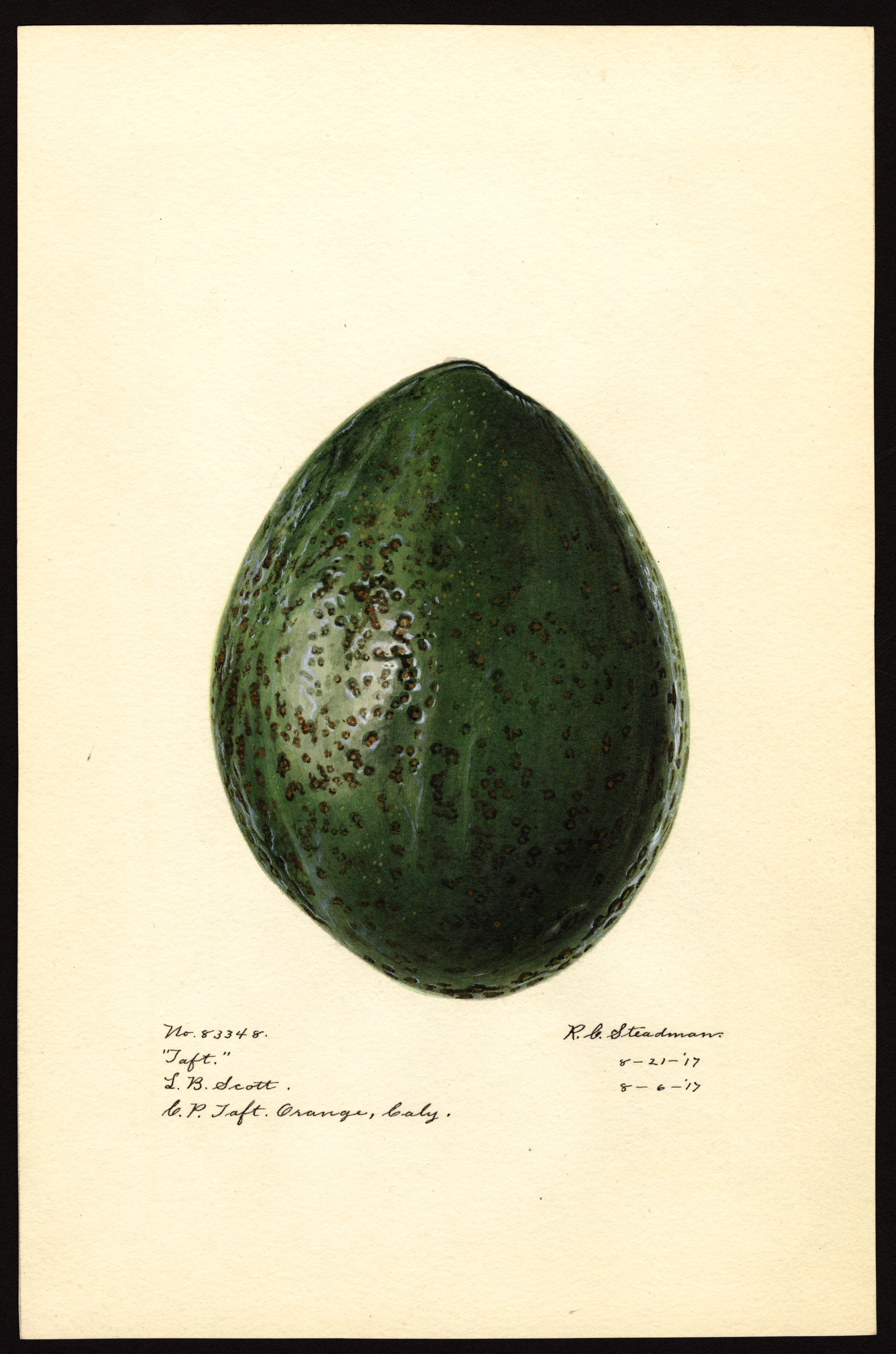

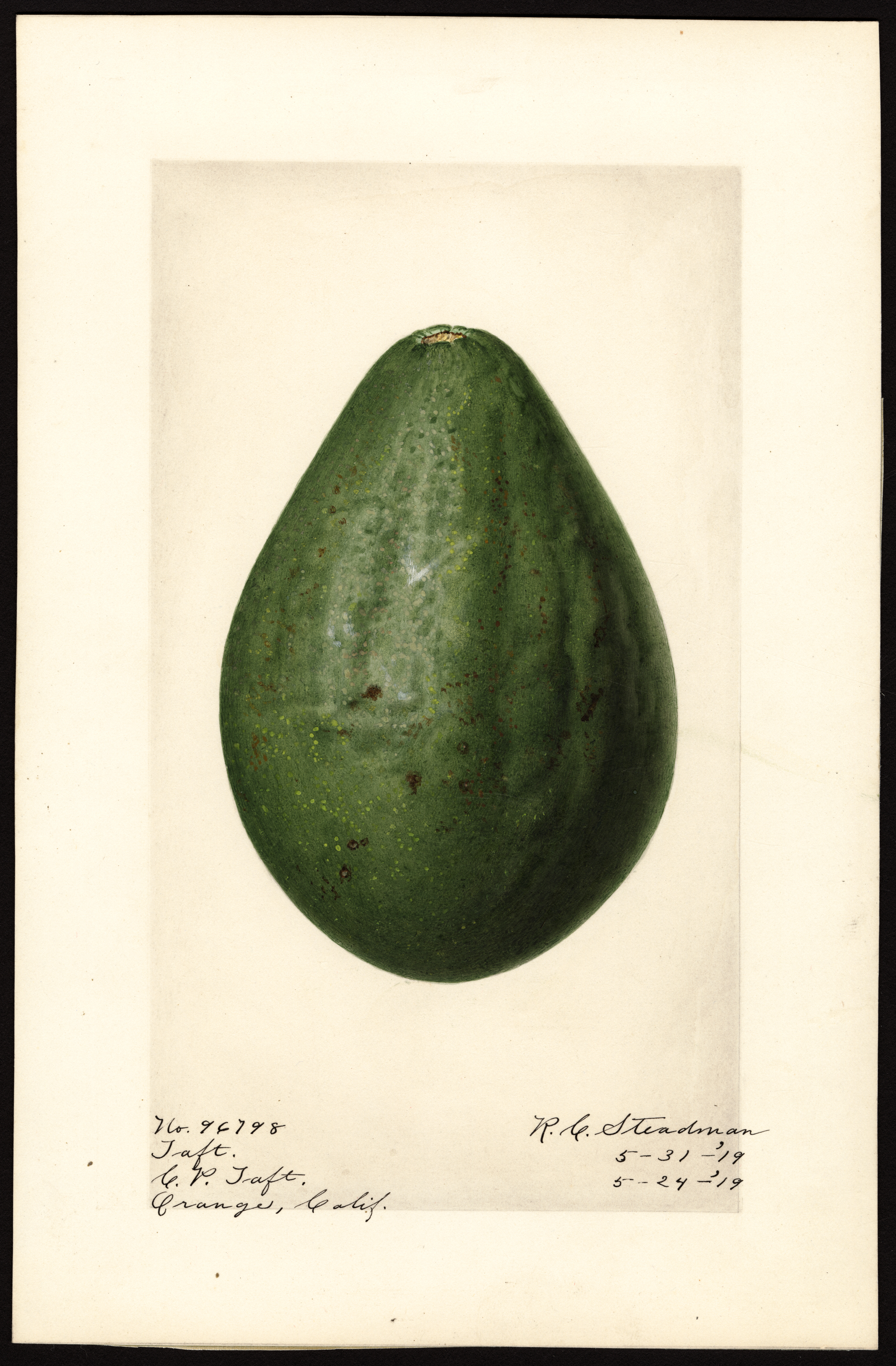

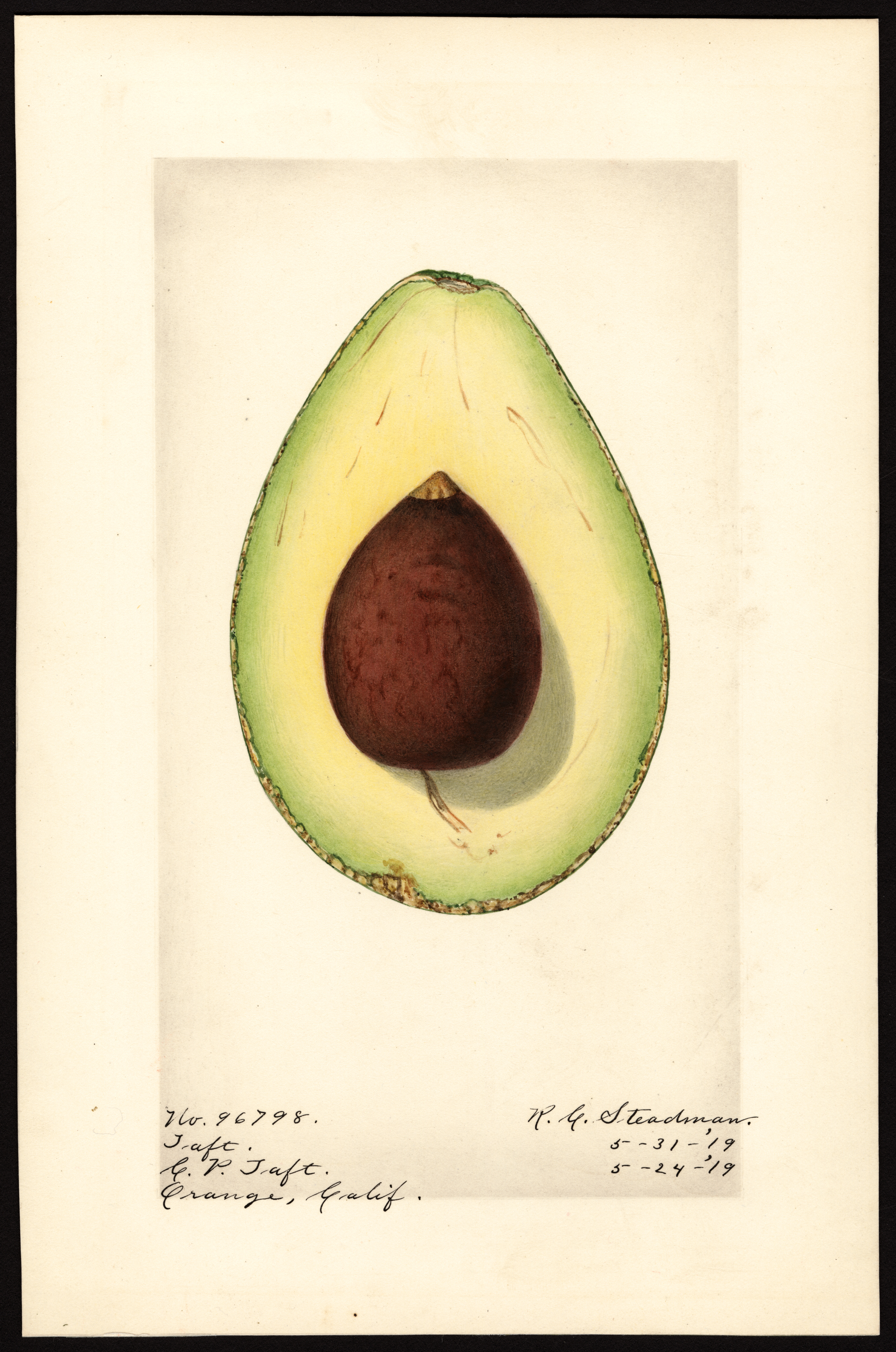

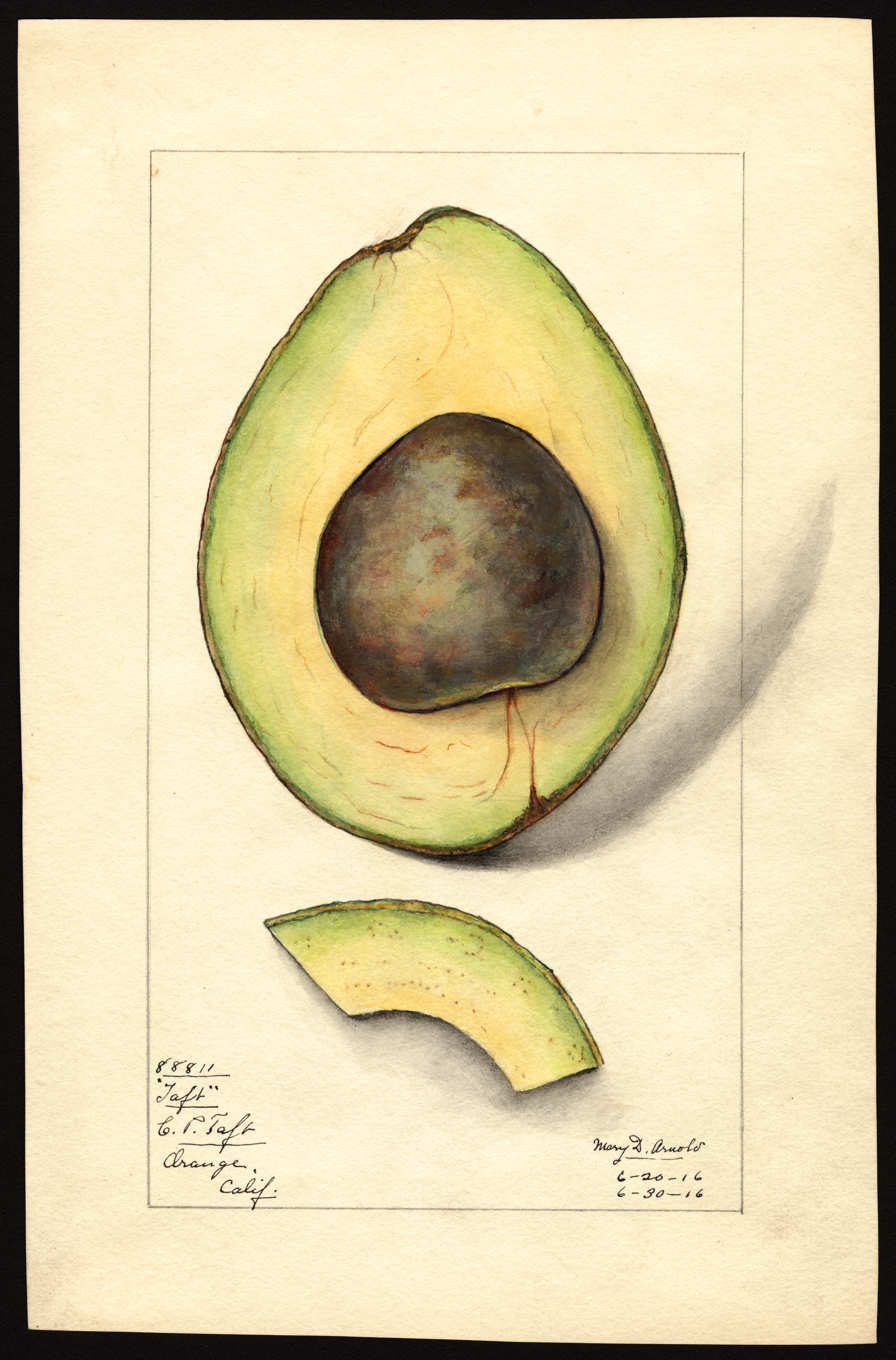

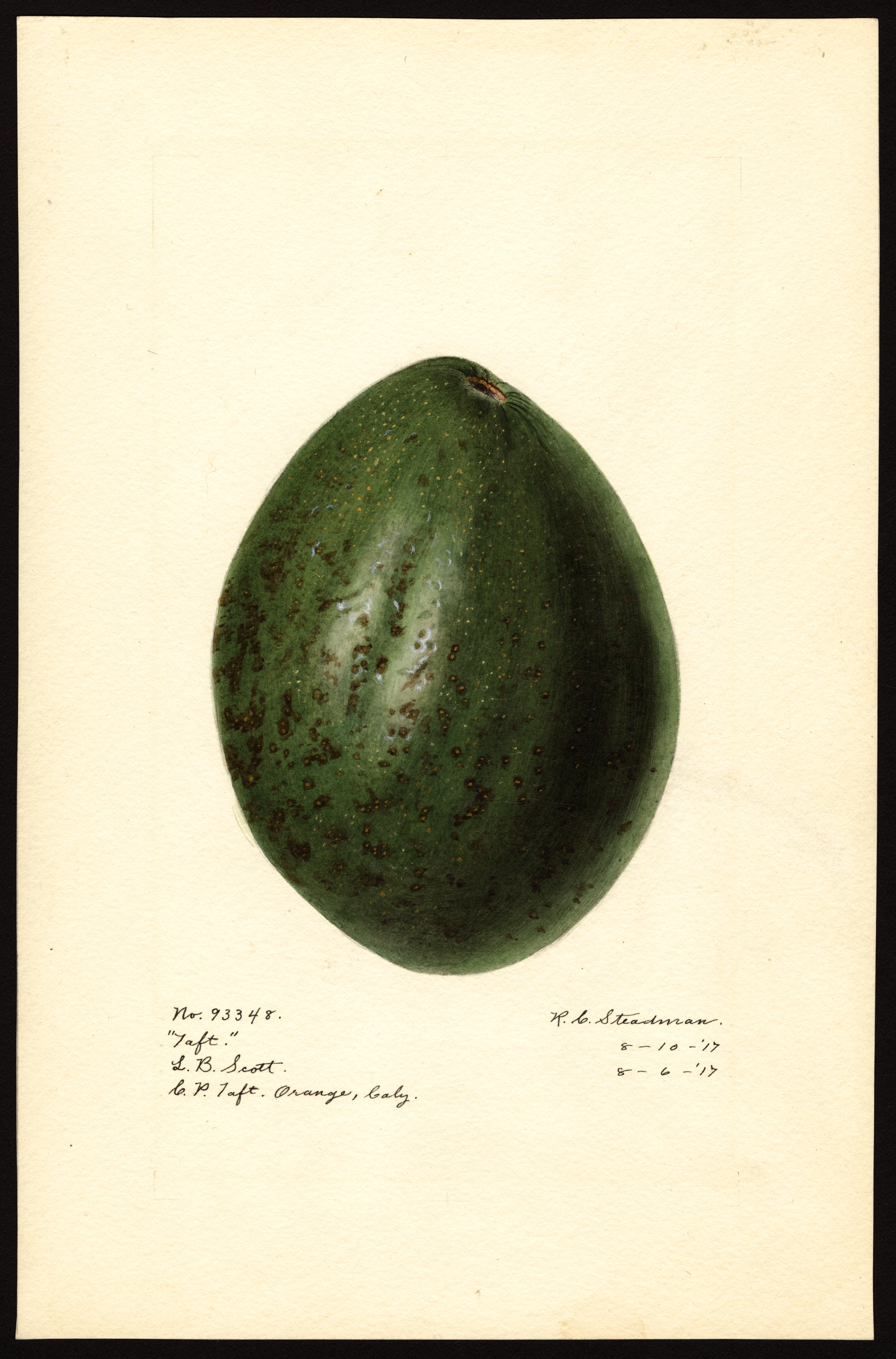

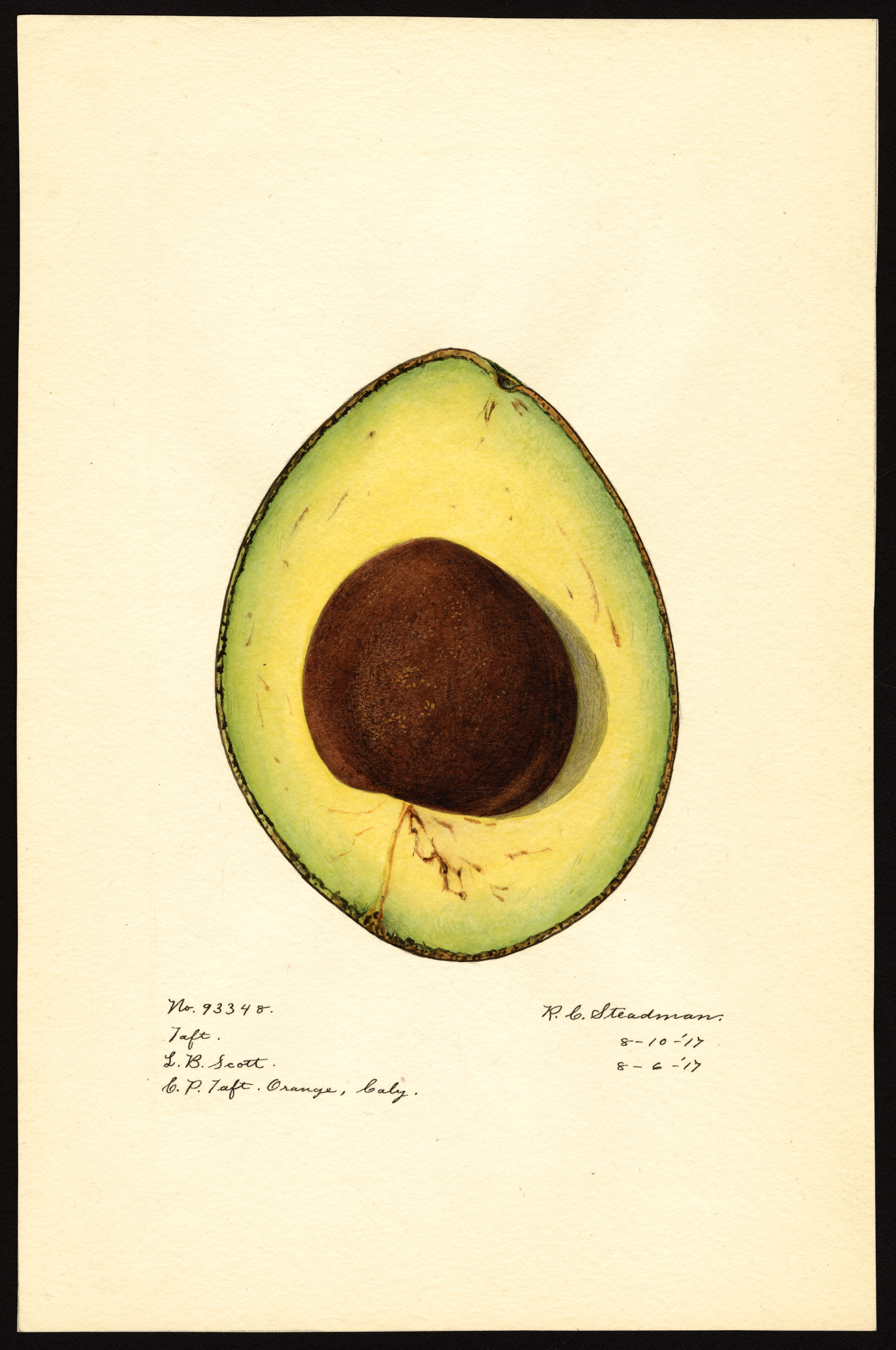
