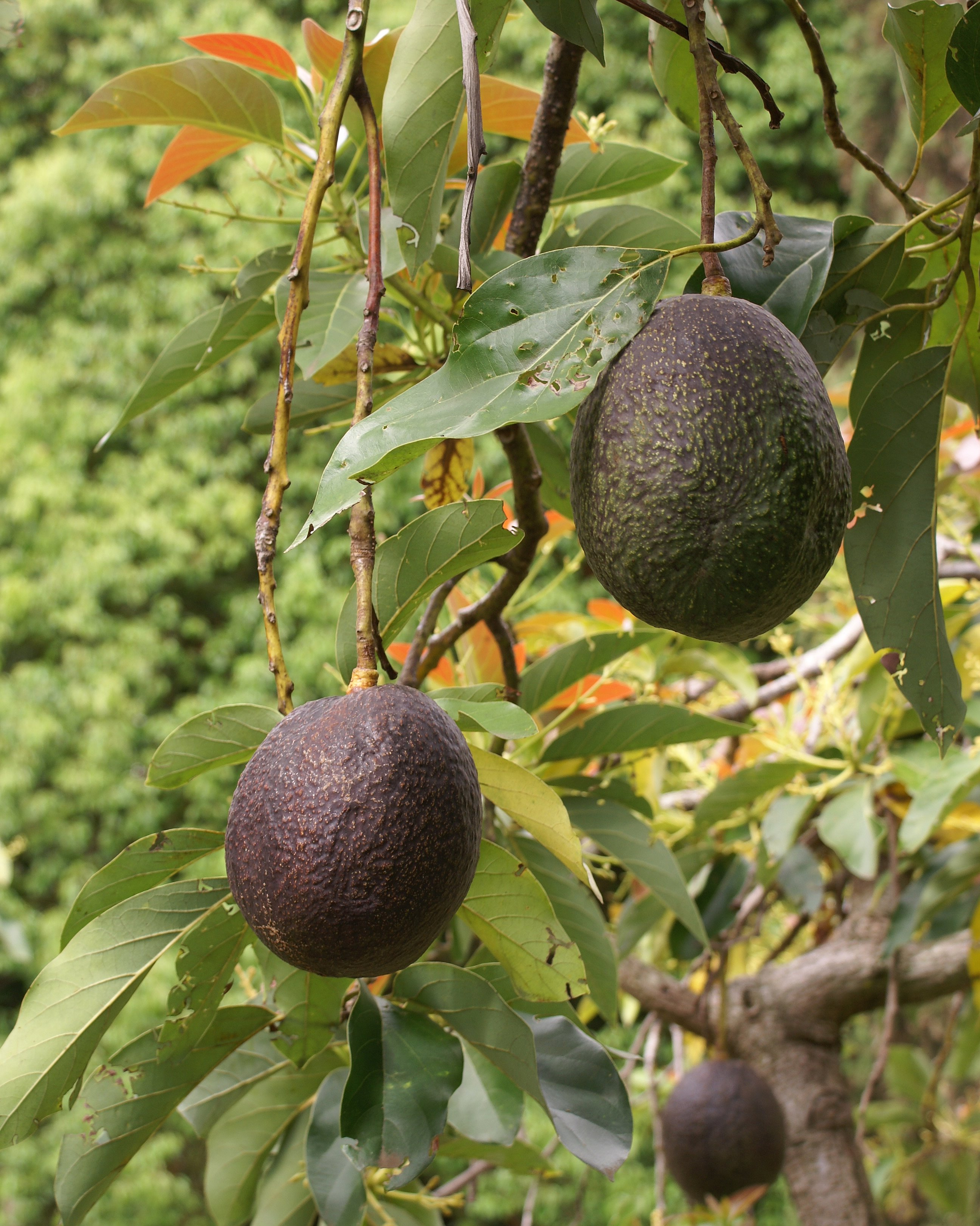
- Avocado fruit and foliage, Réunion island
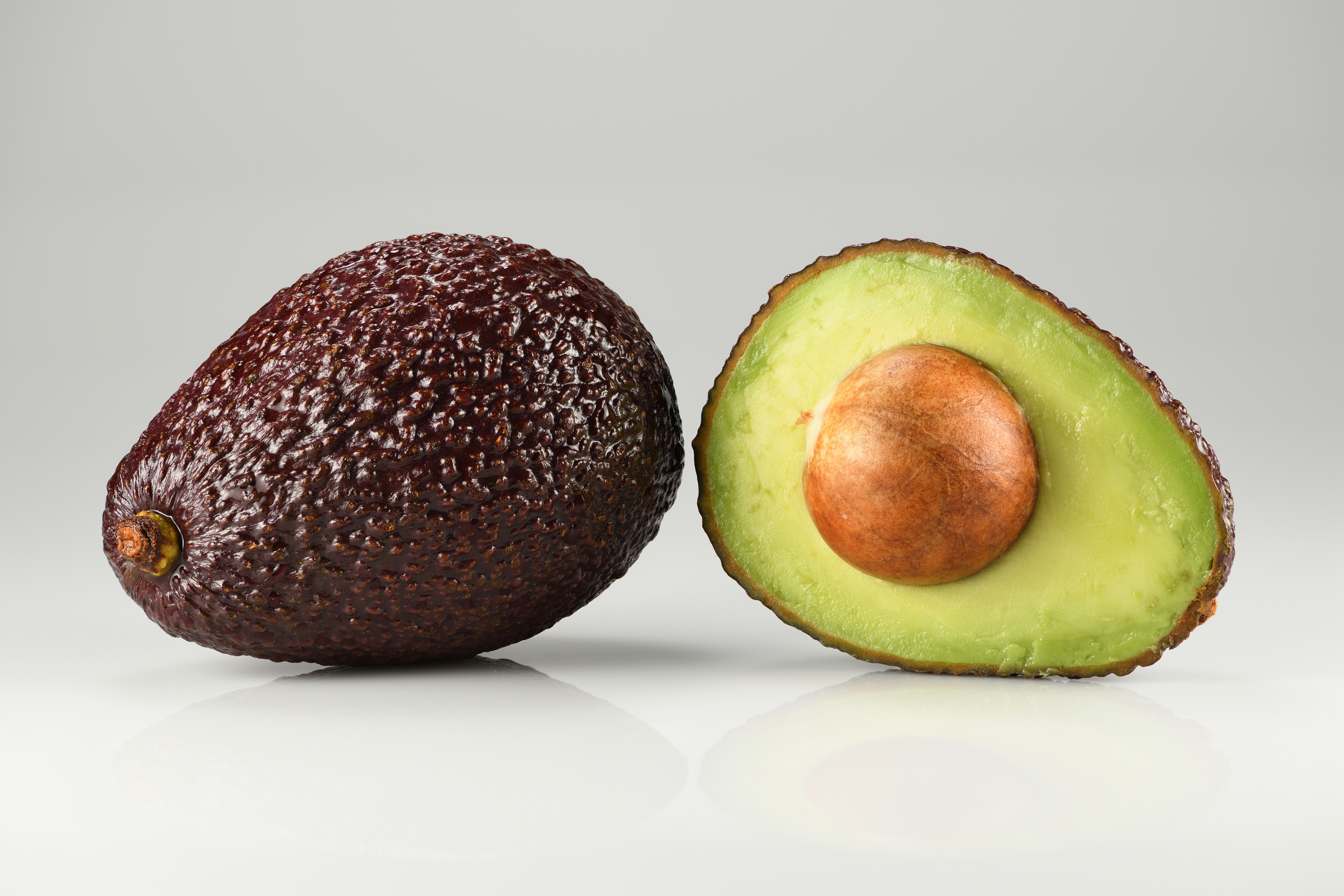
- Whole and halved Hass avocados grown in Colombia

Conservation status
- Least Concern (IUCN 3.1)

Scientific classification
- Kingdom: Plantae
- Clade: Tracheophytes
- Clade: Angiosperms
- Clade: Magnoliids
- Order: Laurales
- Family: Lauraceae
- Genus: Persea
- Species: P. americana

Binomial name
- Persea americana Mill.

Synonyms
- synonymy: Laurus persea L.; Persea americana var. angustifolia Miranda; Persea americana var. drymifolia (Cham. & Schltdl.) S.F. Blake; Persea americana var. nubigena (L.O. Williams) L.E. Kopp; Persea drymifolia Cham. & Schltdl.; Persea edulis Raf.; Persea floccosa Mez; Persea gigantea L.O. Williams; Persea gratissima C.F.Gaertn.; Persea gratissima var. drimyfolia (Schltdl. & Cham.) Mez; Persea gratissima var. macrophylla Meisn.; Persea gratissima var. oblonga Meisn.; Persea gratissima var. praecox Nees; Persea gratissima var. vulgaris Meisn.; Persea leiogyna Blake; Persea nubigena L.O. Williams; Persea nubigena var. guatemalensis L.O. Williams; Persea paucitriplinervia Lundell; Persea persea (L.) Cockerell; Persea steyermarkii C.K. Allen

= Avocado =

Species of flowering plant in the laurel family

The avocado, alligator pear or avocado pear (Persea americana) is an evergreen tree in the laurel family (Lauraceae). It is native to the Americas, with archaeological evidence of early human avocado use dating back thousands of years across various regions of Central and South America. It was prized for its large and unusually oily fruit. The native range of avocado (Persea americana) extends from Mexico to Peru, encompassing much of Central America and parts of northern and western South America.

Its fruit is botanically a large berry containing a single large seed. Sequencing of its genome showed that the evolution of avocados was shaped by polyploidy events and that commercial varieties have a hybrid origin. Avocado trees are partly self-pollinating, and are often propagated through grafting to maintain consistent fruit output. Avocados are currently cultivated in the tropical and Mediterranean climates of many countries. In 2024, Mexico was the world's leading producer of avocados, supplying 25% of the global harvest of 11.2 million tonnes.

The fruit of domestic varieties have smooth, buttery, golden-green flesh when ripe. Depending on the cultivar, avocados have green, brown, purplish, or black skin, and may be pear-shaped, egg-shaped, or spherical. For commercial purposes, the fruits are picked while unripe and ripened after harvesting. The nutrient density and high fat content of avocado flesh are advantages for various cuisines, including vegetarian eating styles.

In major production regions like Mexico and California, the water demands of avocado farms place strain on local resources. Avocado production is implicated in other externalities, including deforestation and human rights concerns associated with the partial control of their production in Mexico by organized crime. Global warming is expected to result in significant changes to the suitable growing zones for avocados, and place additional pressures on the locales in which they are produced due to heat waves and drought.

== Description ==
Persea americana is a tree that grows to 9–20 m (30–66 ft) with a trunk diameter between 0.3–0.6 m (1–2 ft). The leaves are 8–25 cm (3–10 in) long and alternately arranged.

=== Flower ===
Panicles of flowers with deciduous bracts arise from new growth or the axils of leaves. The tree produces thousands of blossoms every year. Avocado blossoms sprout from racemes near the leaf axils; they are small and inconspicuous 5–10 mm (3/16–3/8 in) wide. They have no petals but instead two whorls of three pale-green or greenish-yellow downy perianth lobes, each blossom has 9 stamens with 2 basal orange nectar glands.

=== Fruit ===
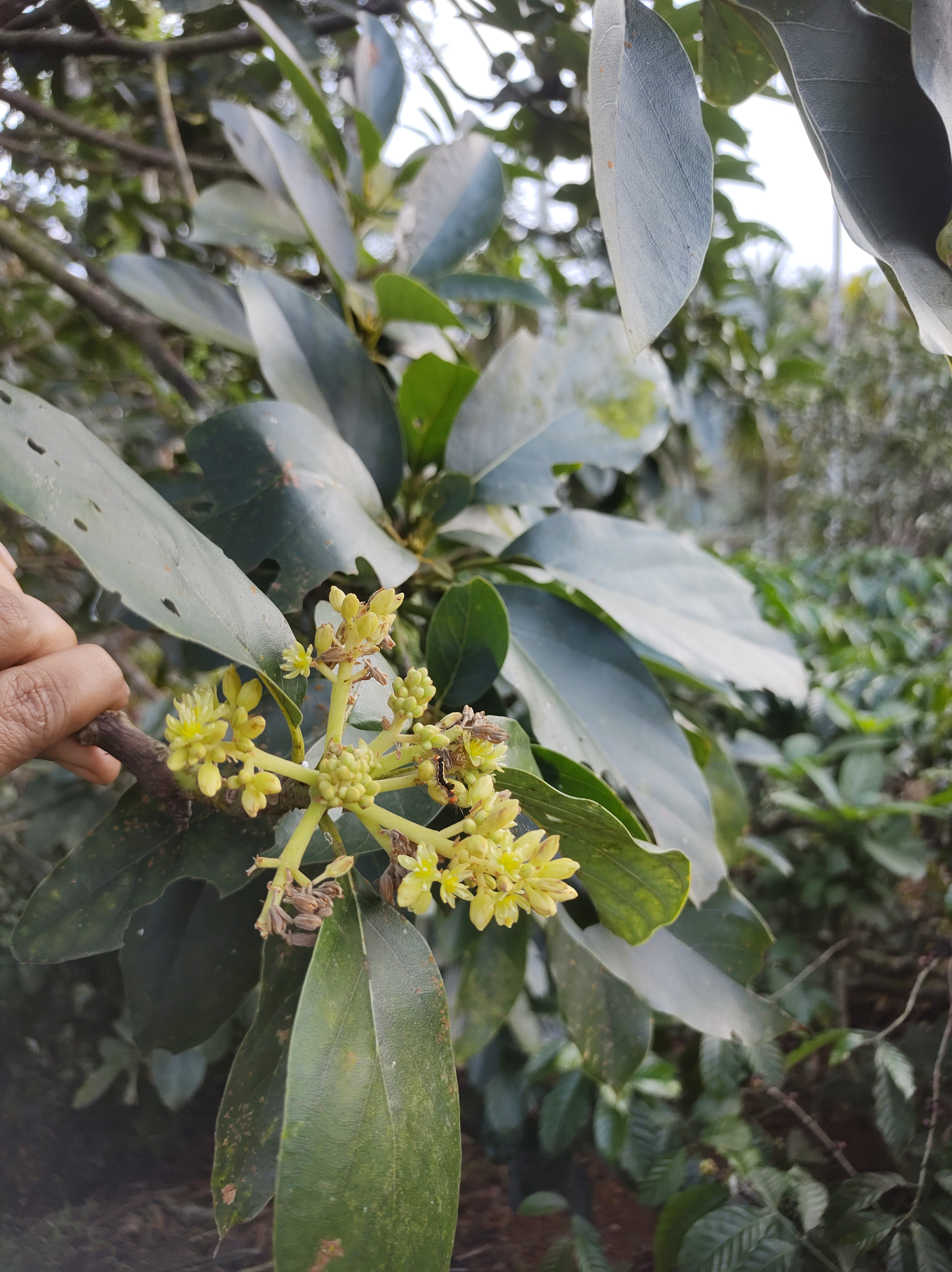
Avocado flower

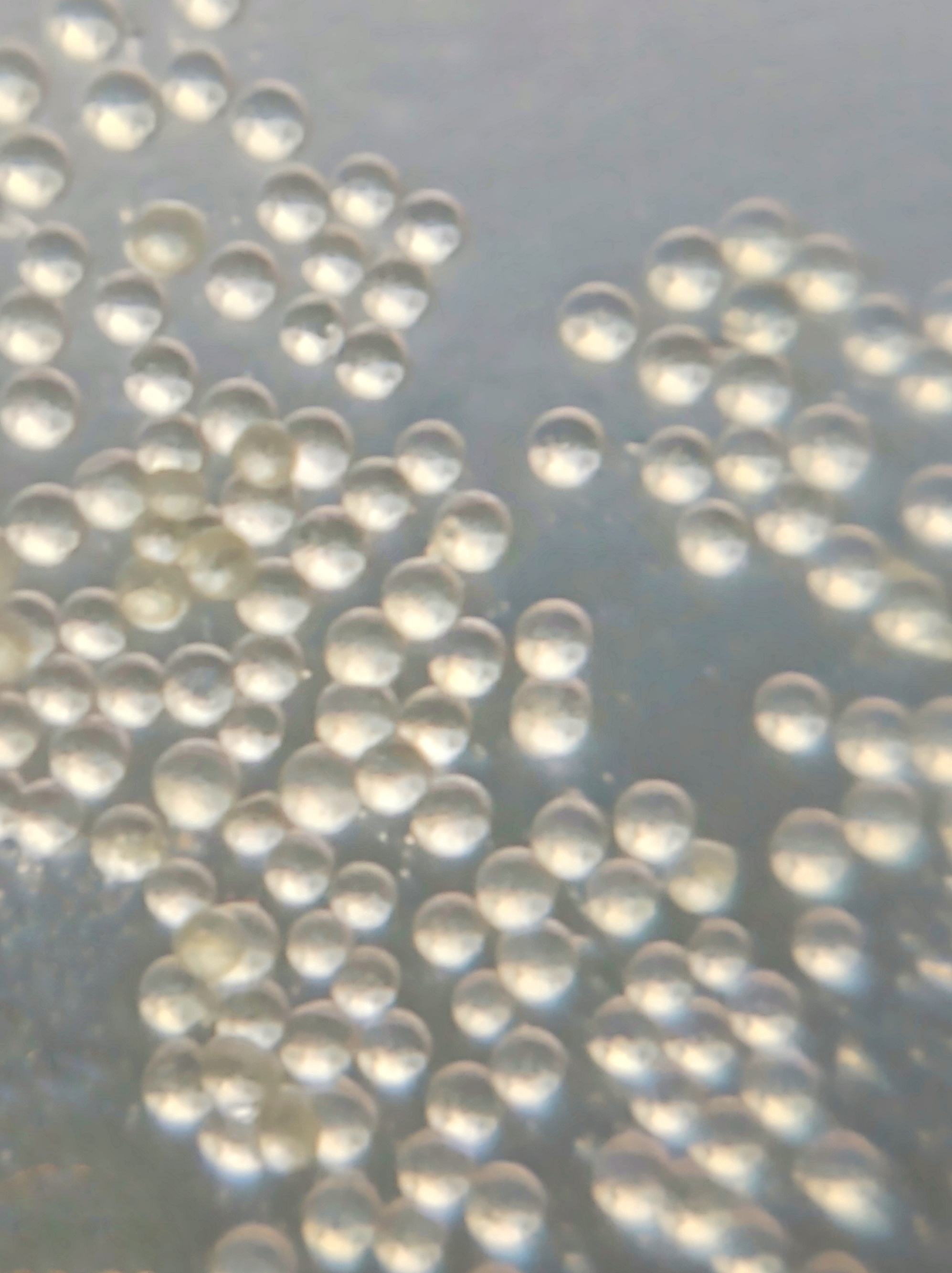
Pollen grains of avocado

The avocado fruit is climacteric, and is defined botanically as a single-seeded berry with an imperceptible endocarp covering the seed; it is not a drupe. The pear-shaped fruit is usually 7–20 cm (3–8 in) long, weighs between 100 and 1,000 g (3 1/2 and 35 1/2 oz), and has a large central seed, 5–6.4 cm (2–2 1/2 in) long. Early wild avocados prior to domestication had much smaller seeds around 2.1–2.2 centimetres (0.83–0.87 in) in diameter, likely corresponding to smaller fruit size.

Various cultivars with larger, fleshier fruits and a thinner exocarp have been developed by selective breeding.

== Taxonomy and evolution ==
The species was scientifically named by the British botanist Philip Miller in 1768. The genus Persea to which the avocado belongs is considered to have a North American origin, with Persea suggested to have diversified in Central America during the Pleistocene epoch. The modern avocado is thought to have speciated from other Persea during the Pleistocene, estimated at around either 1.3 million or 430,000 years ago. A number of authors, including Connie Barlow in her 2001 book The Ghosts of Evolution, have speculated that the avocado is an "evolutionary anachronism" with megafaunal dispersal syndrome (a concept originally proposed in the 1980s by Paul S. Martin and Daniel H. Janzen), arguing that the avocado likely coevolved dispersal of its large seed by now-extinct megafauna. Barlow proposed that the dispersers included the gomphothere (elephant relative) Cuvieronius, as well as ground sloths, toxodontids, and glyptodonts. The concept of evolutionary anachronisms/megafaunal dispersal syndrome has been criticised by some authors, who note that many large fruit are readily dispersed by non-megafaunal animals, with agoutis and spectacled bears having been observed eating avocados.

== History ==
First international air shipment of avocados from Los Angeles to Toronto for the Canadian National Exhibition, 1927

The earliest known written account of the avocado in Europe is that of Martín Fernández de Enciso (c. 1470 – 1528) in 1519 in his book, Suma De Geographia Que Trata De Todas Las Partidas Y Provincias Del Mundo, while describing the native settlement of Yaharo (present-day Dibulla, Colombia). The first detailed account that unequivocally describes the avocado was given by Gonzalo Fernández de Oviedo y Valdés in his work Sumario de la natural historia de las Indias in 1526, while holding administrative Spanish colonial duties in Santo Domingo and visiting Castilla de Oro. The first written record in English of the use of the word 'avocado' was by Hans Sloane, who coined the term, in a 1696 index of Jamaican plants.

=== Etymology ===
The word avocado comes from the Spanish aguacate, which derives from the Nahuatl (Mexican) word āhuacatl [aːˈwakat͡ɬ], which goes back to the proto-Aztecan *pa:wa. In Molina's Nahuatl dictionary "auacatl" is given also as the translation for compañón "testicle", and this has been taken up in popular culture where a frequent claim is that testicle was the word's original meaning. This is not the case, as the original meaning can be reconstructed as "avocado" – rather the word seems to have been used in Nahuatl as a euphemism for "testicle".

The modern English name comes from a rendering of the Spanish aguacate as avogato. The earliest known written use in English is attested from 1697 as avogato pear, later avocado pear (due to its shape), a term sometimes corrupted to alligator pear.

==== Regional names ====
In Central American, Caribbean Spanish-speaking countries, and Spain, it is known by the Spanish name aguacate, while Argentina, Chile, Perú and Uruguay use a Quechua-derived word palta. In Portuguese, it is abacate. The Nahuatl āhuacatl can be compounded with other words, as in ahuacamolli, meaning avocado soup or sauce, from which the Spanish word guacamole derives.

In Trinidad and Tobago, it is known as zaboca, which is derived from the French Creole, 'l'avocat'.

In the United Kingdom the term avocado pear, applied when avocados first became commonly available in the 1960s, is sometimes used. The clipped form, avo, originating as a diminutive in Australian English, has since become a common colloquialism in South Africa and the United Kingdom.

It is known as "butter fruit" in parts of India and Hong Kong.

== Cultivation ==
=== Domestication and cultivation history ===
Domestication, leading to genetically distinct cultivars, is traditionally believed to have originated in the Tehuacan Valley in the state of Puebla, Mexico. Archaeological findings suggest that humans have consumed avocados for many thousands of years. The oldest known avocado remains were discovered at Huaca Prieta, a preceramic site on the northern coast of Peru, where humans were consuming avocados as early as 10,500 years ago. This predates other known evidence, such as avocado pits found in Coxcatlan Cave, dating from around 9,000 to 10,000 years ago, which was previously thought to be the oldest discovery of an avocado pit. Other caves in the Tehuacan Valley from around the same time period also show early evidence of avocado consumption.

In addition to early archaeological evidence from Peru, genetic and linguistic research has identified three major domesticated avocado landraces—Guatemalan (quilaoacatl), Mexican (aoacatl), and West Indian (tlacacolaocatl)—which developed in distinct ecological regions of Mesoamerica and Central America. The Guatemalan and Mexican landraces originated in the highlands of those countries, while the West Indian landrace is a lowland variety found from Guatemala, Costa Rica, Colombia, Ecuador to Peru. It was spread widely through human agency before Europeans arrival. The three separate landraces had likely intermingled (Note: Intermingled in a trade or cultural sense, but not necessarily a genetic one.) in pre-Columbian America and were described in the Florentine Codex. As a result of artificial selection, the fruit and correspondingly the seeds of cultivated avocados became considerably larger relative to their earlier wild forebears millennia before the Columbian exchange.

The earliest residents of northern coastal Peru were living in temporary camps in an ancient wetland and eating avocados, along with chilies, mollusks, sharks, birds, and sea lions. There is additional evidence for avocado use at Norte Chico civilization sites in Peru at Caballo Muerto in Peru from around 3,800 to 4,500 years ago.

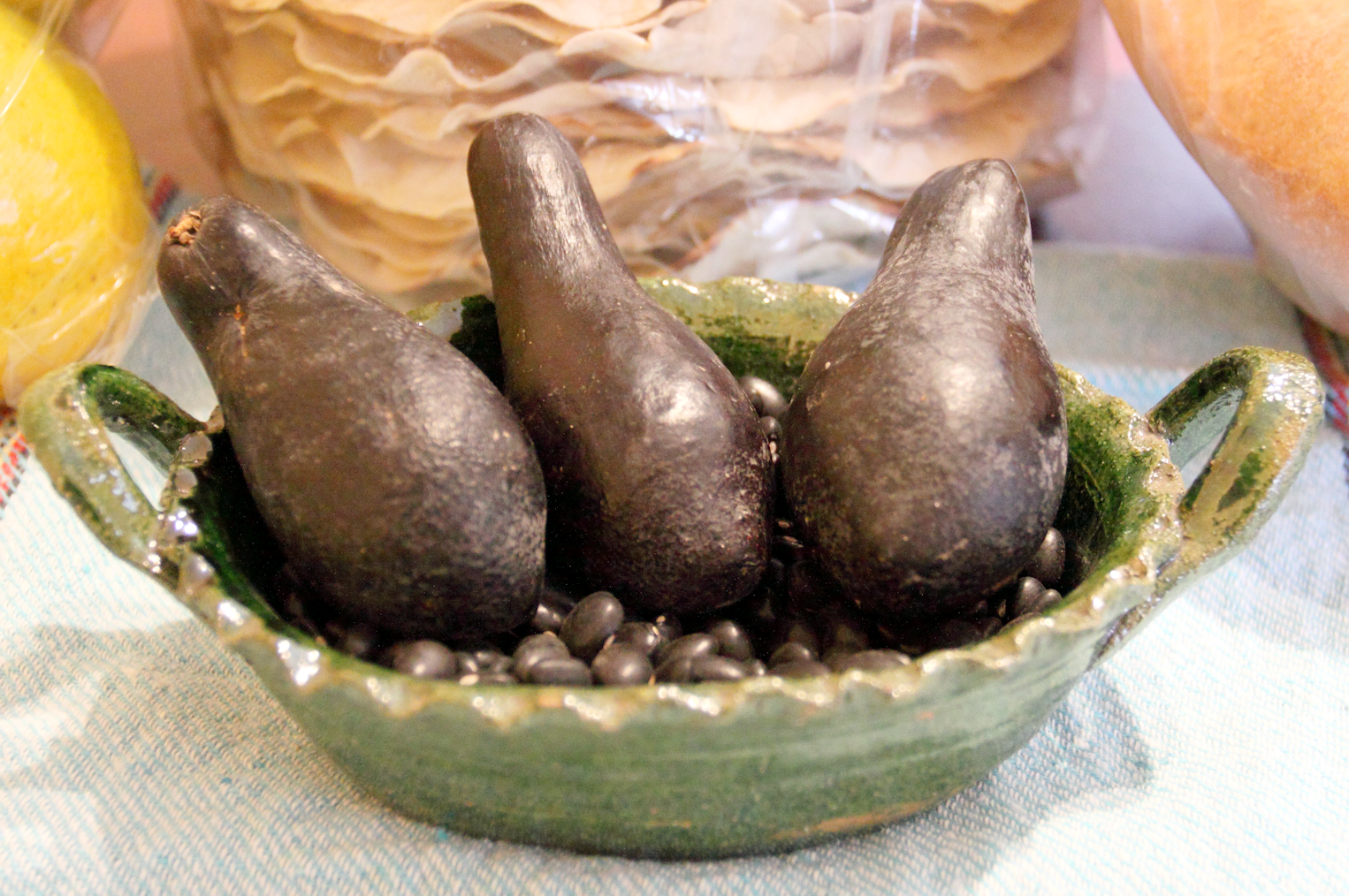
Native Oaxaca criollo avocados, the ancestral form of today's domesticated varieties

The avocado tree has a long history of cultivation in Central and South America, now known to be much earlier than previously thought. A water jar shaped like an avocado, dating to AD 900, was discovered in the pre-Inca city of Chan Chan.

The plant was introduced to Spain in 1601, Indonesia around 1750, Mauritius in 1780, Brazil in 1809, the United States mainland in 1825, South Africa and Australia in the late 19th century, and the Ottoman Empire in 1908. In the United States, the avocado was introduced to Florida and Hawaii in 1833 and in California in 1856.

The name avocado has been used in English since at least 1764, with minor spelling variants such as avogato attested even earlier. The avocado was commonly referred to in California as ahuacate and in Florida as alligator pear until 1915, when the California Avocado Association popularized the term avocado.

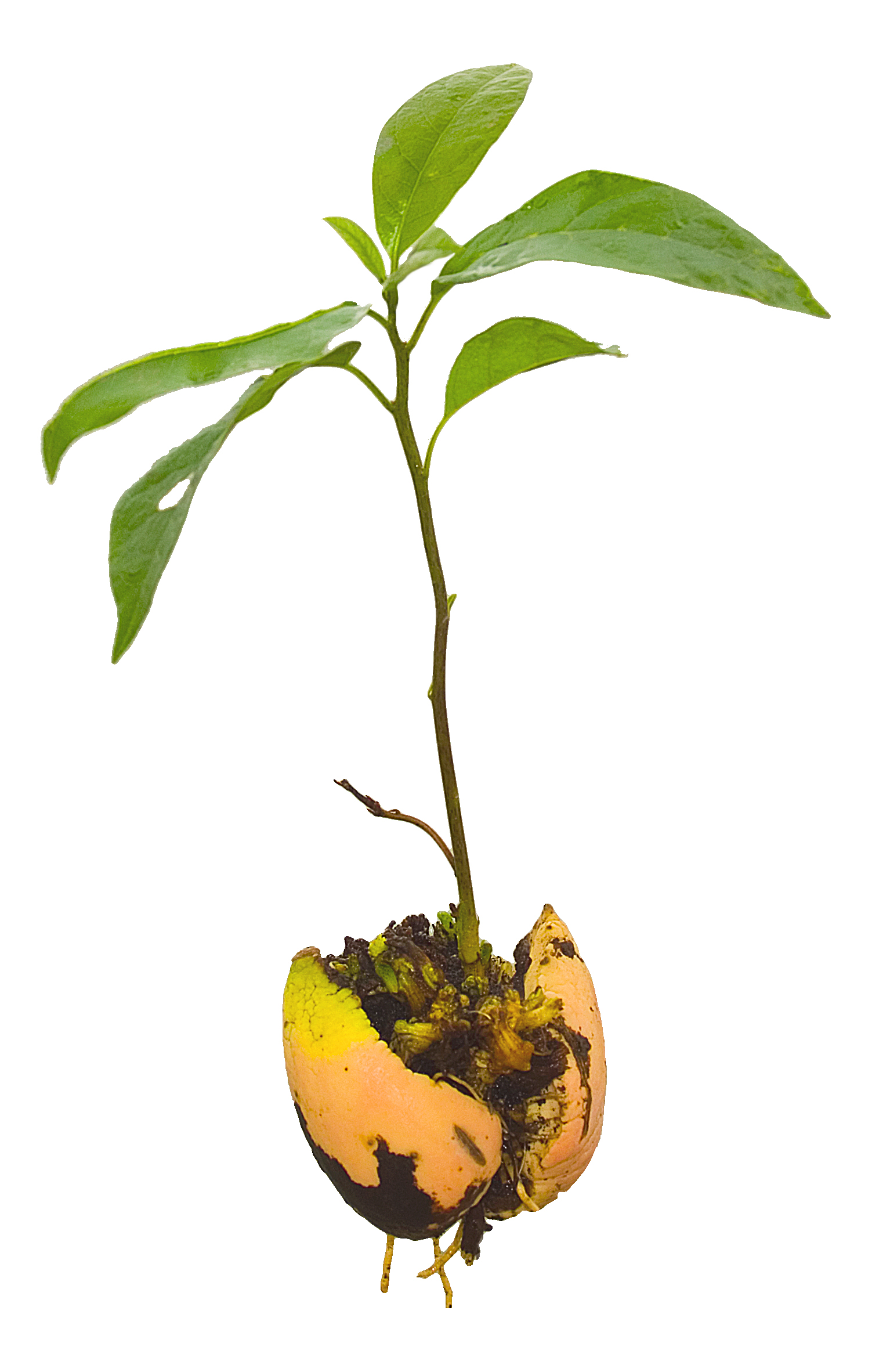
Persea americana, young avocado plant (seedling), complete with parted pit and roots

=== Environmental concerns and water stress ===
The expansion of avocado farming causes large-scale environmental changes, such as deforestation, impacts on biodiversity and carbon levels, and losses in soil moisture and potable water supplies. Climate change directly affects avocado trees and production by causing heat stress, drought, water scarcity, and extreme weather events. Workers on avocado farms may be exposed to pesticides and experience extortion, poverty, and forced displacement.

Increasing farming pressures for avocado output may cause water shortages and disputes in high production areas, such as in the Mexican state of Michoacán where water consumption can exceed renewable water supply in some regions. Water requirements for growing avocados are three times higher than for apples, and 18 times higher than for tomatoes.

=== Harvest and postharvest ===
Commercial orchards produce an average of seven tonnes per hectare each year, with some orchards achieving 20 tonnes per hectare. Biennial bearing can be a problem, with heavy crops in one year being followed by poor yields the next.

Like the banana, the avocado is a climacteric fruit, which matures on the tree, but ripens off the tree. Avocados used in commerce are picked hard and green and kept in coolers at 3.3 to 5.6 °C (37.9 to 42.1 °F) until they reach their final destination. Avocados must be mature to ripen properly. Avocados that fall off the tree ripen on the ground. Generally, the fruit is picked once it reaches maturity; Mexican growers pick 'Hass' avocados when they have more than 23% dry matter, and other producing countries have similar standards. Once picked, avocados ripen in one to two weeks (depending on the cultivar) at room temperature (faster if stored with other fruits such as apples or bananas, because of the influence of ethylene gas). Some supermarkets sell ripened avocados which have been treated with synthetic ethylene to hasten ripening. The use of an ethylene gas "ripening room", which is now an industry standard, was pioneered in the 1980s by farmer Gil Henry of Escondido, California, in response to footage from a hidden supermarket camera which showed shoppers repeatedly squeezing hard, unripe avocados, putting them "back in the bin", and moving on without making a purchase. In some cases, avocados can be left on the tree for several months, which is an advantage to commercial growers who seek the greatest return for their crop, but if the fruit remains unpicked for too long, it falls to the ground.

=== Breeding ===
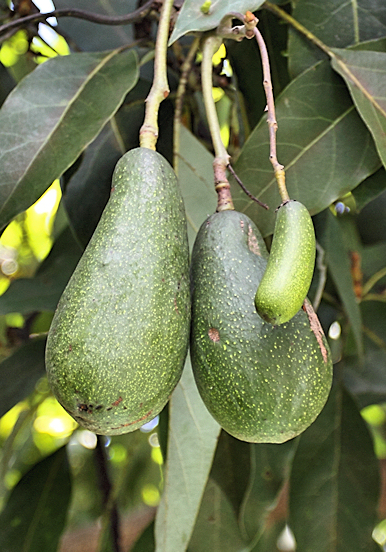
A seedless avocado, or cuke, growing next to two regular Ettinger avocados

The species is only partially able to self-pollinate because of dichogamy in its flowering. This limitation, added to the long juvenile period, makes the species difficult to breed. Most cultivars are propagated by grafting, having originated from random seedling plants or minor mutations derived from cultivars. Modern breeding programs tend to use isolation plots where the chances of cross-pollination are reduced. That is the case for programs at the University of California, Riverside, as well as the Volcani Centre and the Instituto de Investigaciones Agropecuarias in Chile.

The avocado is unusual in that the timing of the male and female flower phases differs among cultivars. The two flowering types are A and B. A-cultivar flowers open as female on the morning of the first day and close in late morning or early afternoon. Then they open as male in the afternoon of the second day. B varieties open as female on the afternoon of the first day, close in late afternoon and reopen as male the following morning.

- A cultivars: 'Hass', 'Gwen', 'Lamb Hass', 'Pinkerton', 'Reed'
- B cultivars: 'Fuerte', 'Sharwil', 'Zutano', 'Bacon', 'Ettinger', 'Sir Prize', 'Walter Hole'

Certain cultivars, such as the 'Hass', have a tendency to bear well only in alternate years. After a season with a low yield, due to factors such as cold (which the avocado does not tolerate well), the trees tend to produce abundantly the next season. In addition, due to environmental circumstances during some years, seedless avocados may appear on the trees. Known in the avocado industry as "cukes", they are usually discarded commercially due to their small size.

=== Propagation and rootstocks ===
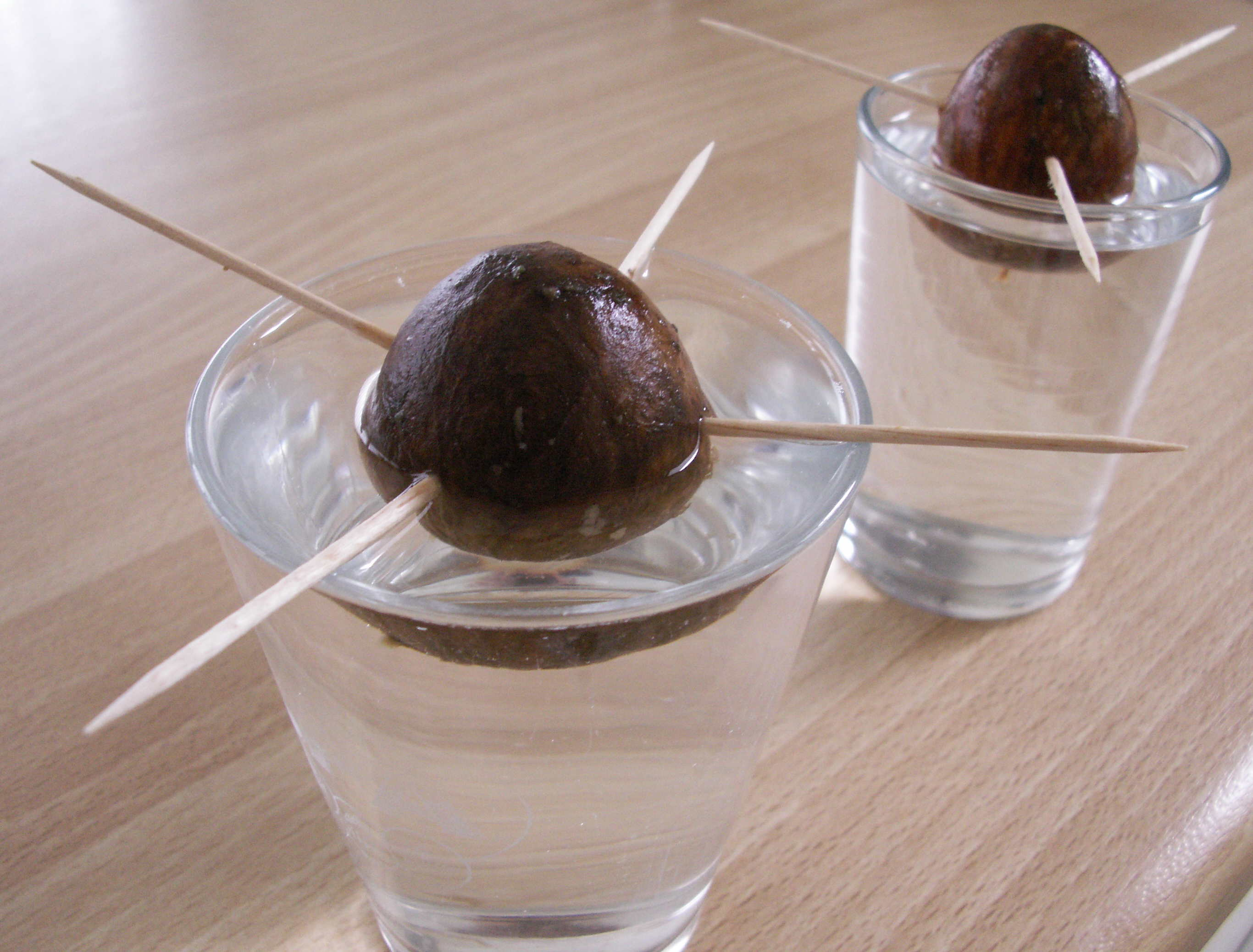
A common technique to germinate avocados at home is to use toothpicks poked into the avocado pit to suspend the pit partially in water.

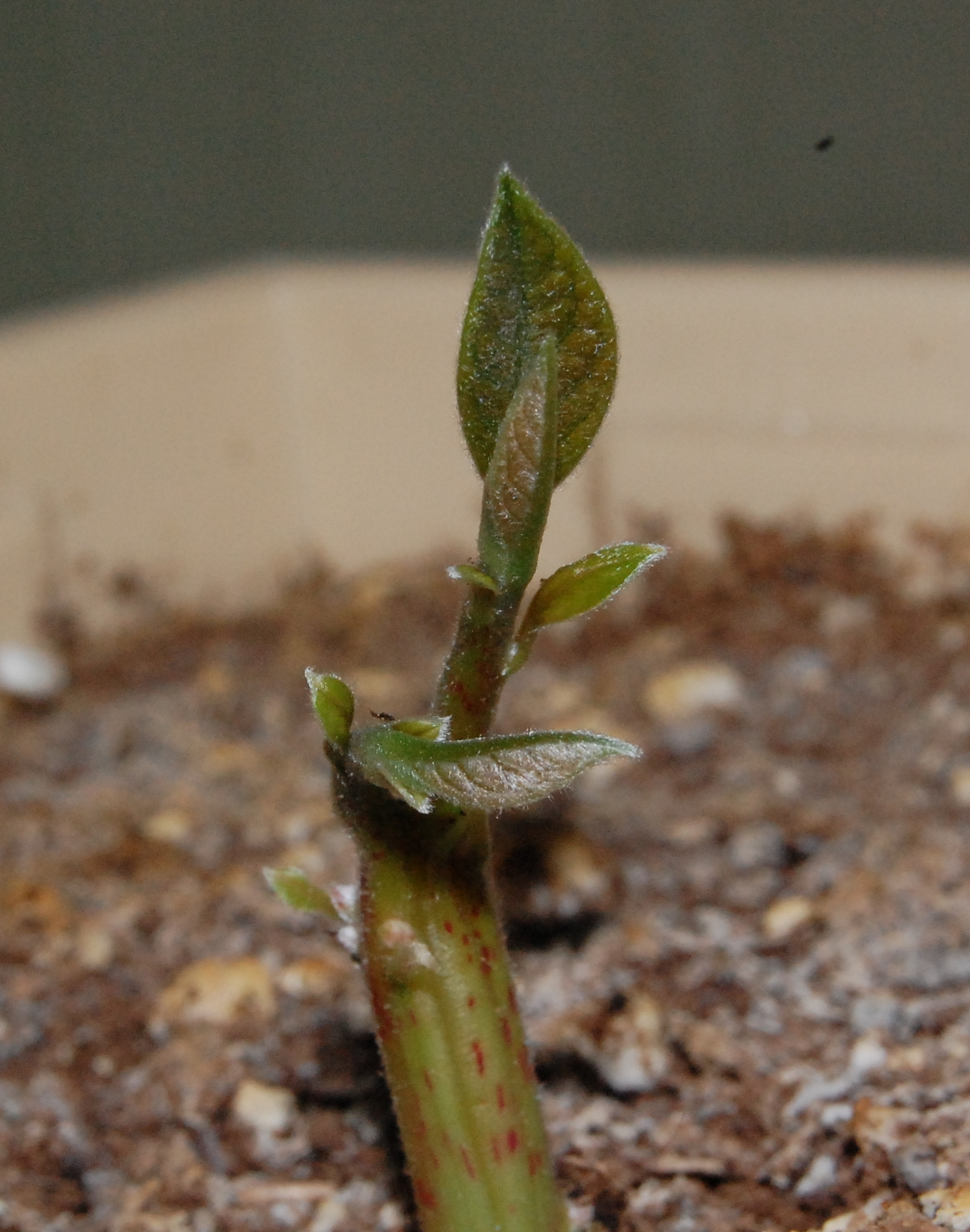
Young avocado sprout

Avocados can be propagated by seed, taking roughly four to six years to bear fruit, although in some cases seedlings can take 10 years to come into bearing. The offspring is unlikely to be identical to the parent cultivar in fruit quality. Prime quality varieties are therefore propagated by grafting to rootstocks that are propagated by seed (seedling rootstocks) or by layering (clonal rootstocks). After about a year of growing in a greenhouse, the young rootstocks are ready to be grafted. Terminal and lateral grafting is normally used. The scion cultivar grows for another 6–12 months before the tree is ready to be sold. Clonal rootstocks are selected for tolerance of specific soil and disease conditions, such as poor soil aeration or resistance to the soil-borne disease (root rot) caused by Phytophthora cinnamomi. Advances in cloning techniques that can produce up to 500 new plants from a single millimetre of tree cutting have the potential to increase the availability of rootstocks.

Commercial avocado production is limited to a small fraction of the vast genetic diversity in the species. Conservation of this genetic diversity has relied largely on field collection, as avocado seeds often do not survive storage in seed banks. This is problematic, as field preservation of living cultivars is expensive, and habitat loss threatens wild cultivars. More recently, an alternate method of conservation has been developed based on cryopreservation of avocado somatic embryos with reliable methods for somatic embryogenesis and reconstitution into living trees.

=== As a houseplant ===
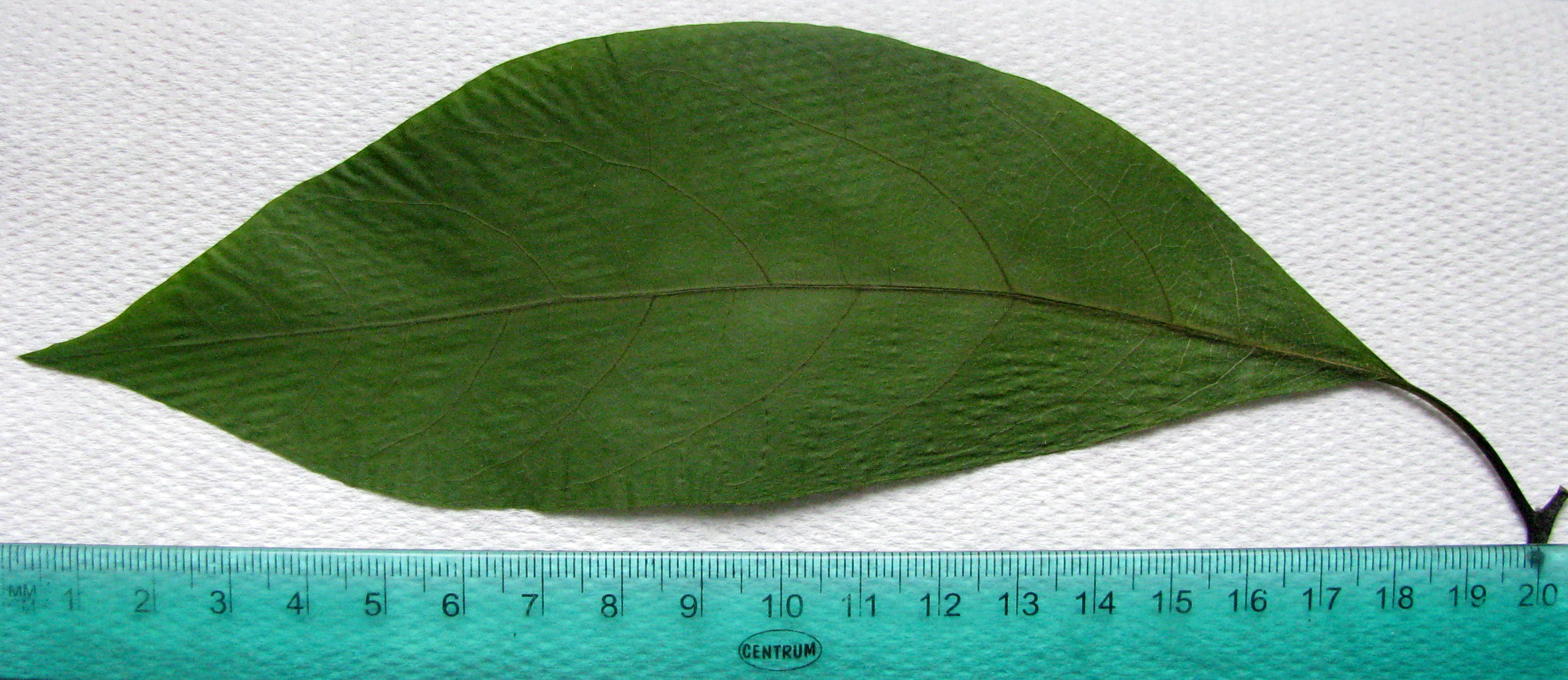
Avocado houseplant leaf with ruler to indicate size (numbers in cm)

The avocado tree can be grown domestically and used as a decorative houseplant. The pit germinates in normal soil conditions or partially submerged in a small glass (or container) of water. In the latter method, the pit sprouts in four to six weeks, at which time it is planted in standard houseplant potting soil. The plant normally grows large enough to be prunable; it does not bear fruit unless it has ample sunlight. Home gardeners can graft a branch from a fruit-bearing plant to speed maturity, which typically takes four to six years to bear fruit.

=== Pests and diseases ===
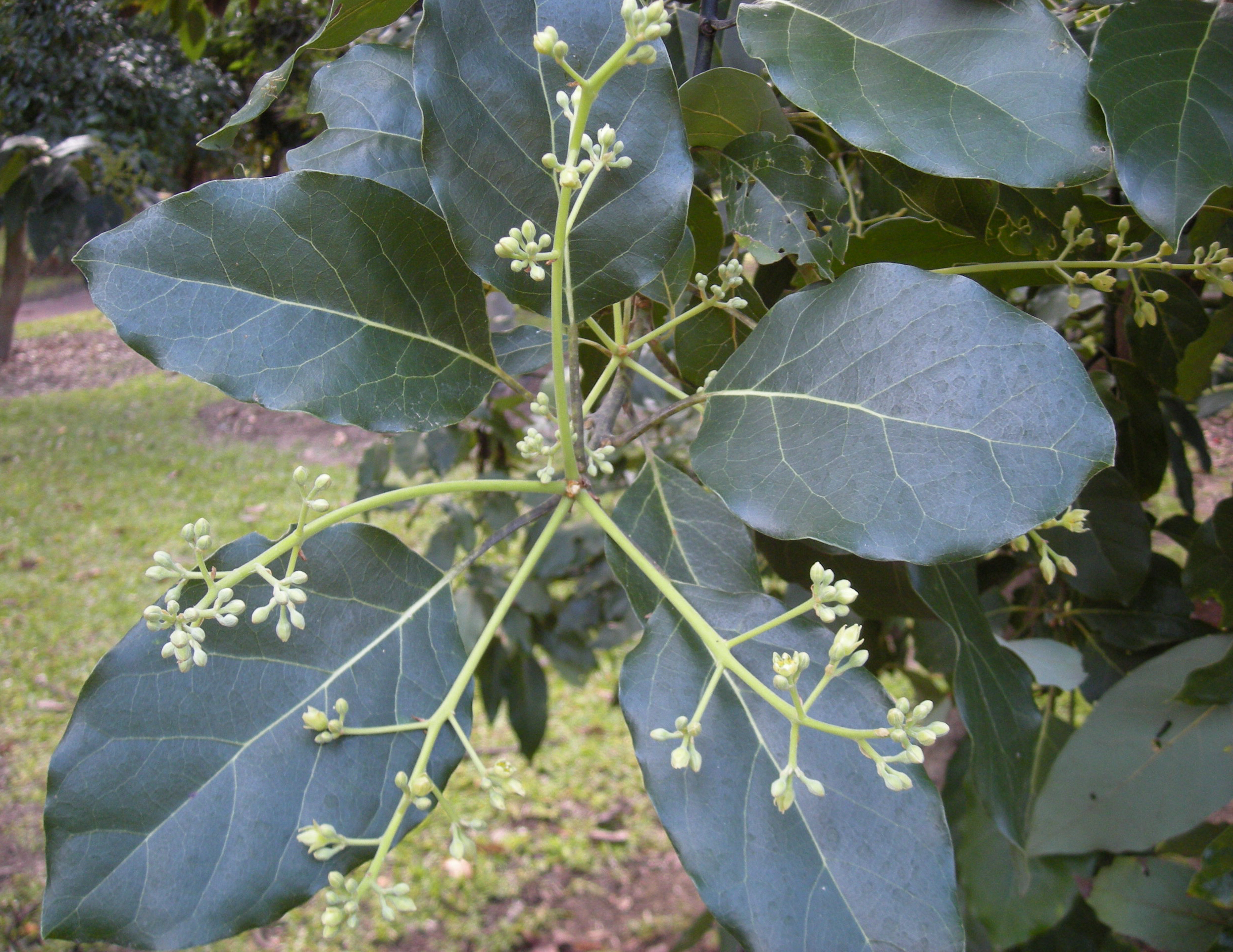
P. americana, avocado plant flowers

Avocado trees are vulnerable to bacterial, viral, fungal, and nutritional diseases (excesses and deficiencies of key minerals). Disease can affect all parts of the plant, causing spotting, rotting, cankers, pitting, and discoloration. The pyriform scale insect (Protopulvinaria pyriformis) is known from Australia, South Africa, Israel, Italy, France, Spain, Cuba, Florida, and Peru. It is normally found on avocado, and in Peru it is said to be the worst insect pest of the fruit. Certain cultivars of avocado seem more susceptible to attack by the scale than others.

=== Cultivation by country ===
==== Mexico ====
Mexico is the world's largest avocado growing country, producing twice the volume compared to Colombia, the second largest producer (table in Production section). Total acreage under cultivation in Mexico in 2022 was 252,133 ha (623,030 acres), with national production doubling between 2013 and 2023.

Mexico's avocado belt, also known as the Green Gold Belt, has the world’s largest integrated industry, led by Michoacán producing ten times the avocado output of any other Mexican state. In 2024, Michoacán accounted for 75% of Mexican avocados, exporting 81% of its volume to the United States at a value of $2.7 billion. Some 90% of all avocados consumed in the United States in 2024 came from Mexico.

Cultivation in Michoacán is complicated by alleged corruption in the industry and interference by drug cartels extorting fees from growers and transporters.

==== Colombia ====
In 2025, Colombia was one of the world's fastest growing countries for Hass avocado production, increasing its output by 6 times in 10 years. Key producing regions include Antioquia, Risaralda, and Caldas where orchards receive abundant rain, having reduced need for irrigation and low water stress. Orchards in Colombia are on mineral-rich, volcanic soils and at favorable altitudes and climates, enabling a year-round harvest and consistent quality. The avocado sector supports over 60,000 jobs across 16 regions of Colombia, facilitating rural development.

The Netherlands received 53% of Colombian avocado exports in 2025, and the United States imported 200 million pounds (91 million kg) in 2024-25.

==== Peru ====
Hass avocado production encompasses thousands of hectares in central and western Peru. In 2019, Peru was the largest supplier of avocados imported to the European Union and the second largest supplier to Asia and the United States. Due to the environmental conditions of climate change, particularly along the hotter coastal growing regions, Peruvian avocados were smaller and had to be harvested earlier during 2026 compared to previous years.

==== California ====
In the United States, California produces about 90% of the national annual volume of avocados. Avocados were introduced to California from Nicaragua in 1856, when imported avocado trees were observed growing near Los Angeles. Not until 1871 were avocado trees cultivated by Judge R. B. Ord in Santa Barbara.

California avocado farming is a major industry, producing more than 375 million pounds (170 million kg) in 2025. The Hass avocado is 95% of production in California, with San Diego County as the most productive region.

Avocados are grown mainly in southern and central California regions having a Mediterranean climate with water supplies under mandatory restrictions, increased costs, and elevated salinity, a factor damaging avocado trees. Pressures from climate change and periodic drought require farmers to apply new irrigation methods, in attempts to meet an average need of 20 US gal (76 L; 17 imp gal) of water per tree per day. In Ventura County, a region with temperatures rising annually, crop damage occurs annually.

Avocado is the official fruit of the state of California. The city of Fallbrook claims the title of "Avocado Capital of the World" (without official recognition; also claimed by the town of Uruapan in Mexico), with both Fallbrook and Carpinteria hosting annual avocado festivals.

The California Avocado Commission and California Avocado Society are major grower organizations.

=== Cultivars ===
==== A cultivars ====
- 'Choquette':
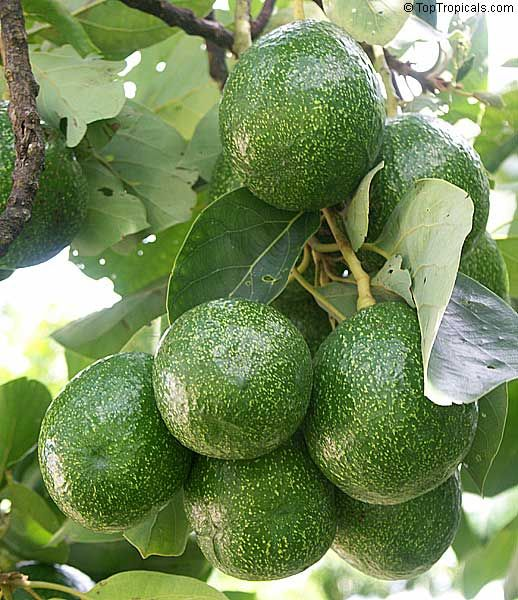
  Avocado 'Choquette' grafted
  A seedling from Miami, Florida. 'Choquette' bore large fruit of good eating quality in large quantities and had good disease resistance, and thus became a major cultivar. Today 'Choquette' is widely propagated in south Florida both for commercial growing and for home growing.
- 'Gwen': A seedling bred from 'Hass' x 'Thille' in 1982, 'Gwen' is higher yielding and more dwarfing than 'Hass' in California. The fruit has an oval shape, slightly smaller than 'Hass' (100–200 g or 3 1/2–7 oz), with a rich, nutty flavor. The skin texture is more finely pebbled than 'Hass', and is dull green when ripe. It is frost-hardy down to −1 °C (30 °F).
- 'Hass':
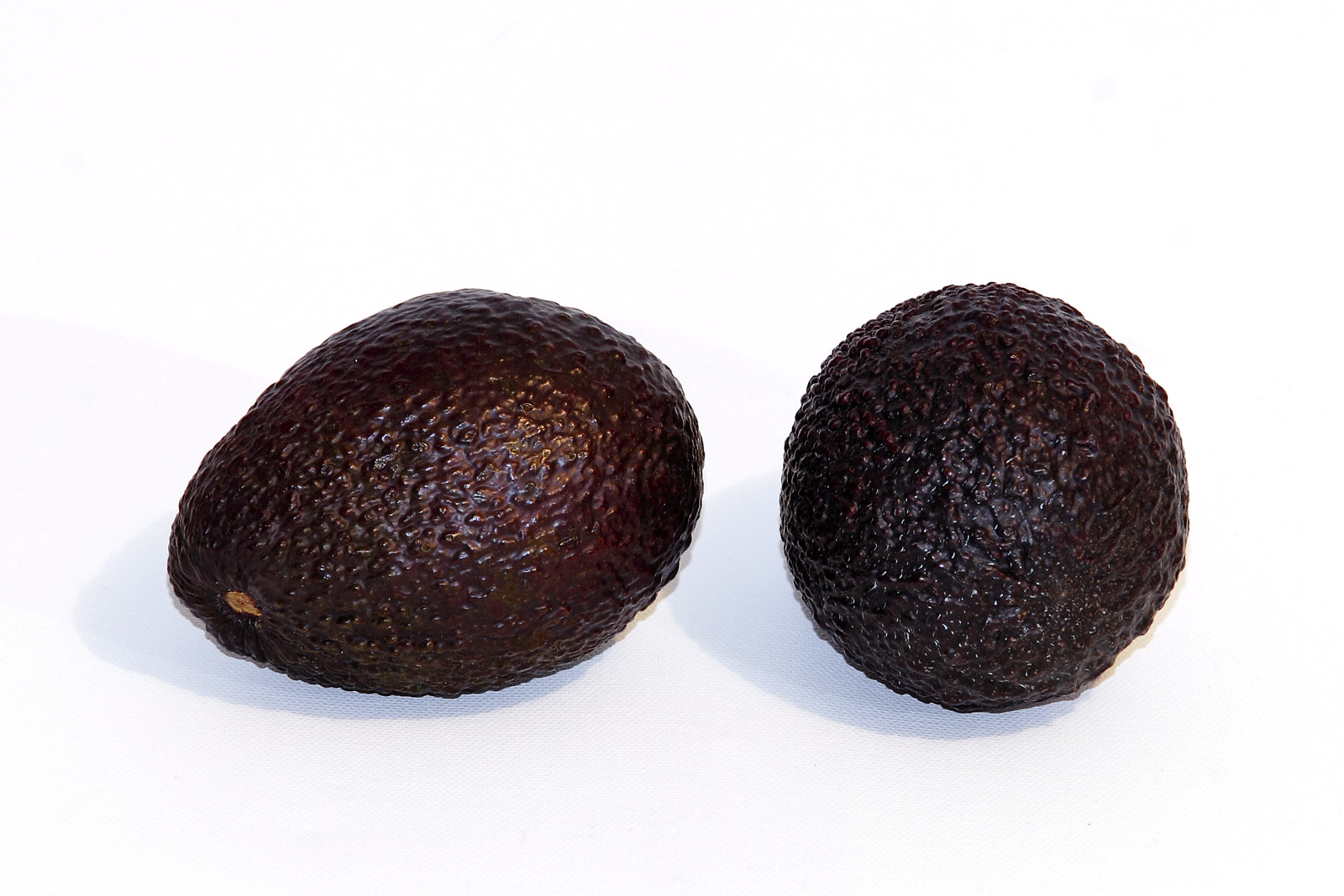
  Two 'Hass' avocados
  The 'Hass' is the most common cultivar of avocado. It produces fruit year-round and accounts for 80% of cultivated avocados in the world. All 'Hass' trees are descended from a single "mother tree" raised by a mail carrier named Rudolph Hass, of La Habra Heights, California. Hass patented the productive tree in 1935. The "mother tree", of uncertain subspecies, died of root rot and was cut down in September 2002.
- 'Lula': A seedling reportedly grown from a 'Taft' avocado planted in Miami on the property of George Cellon, it is named after Cellon's wife, Lula. It was likely a cross between Guatemalan and Mexican types. 'Lula' was recognized for its flavor and high oil content and propagated commercially in Florida.
- 'Maluma': A relatively new cultivar, it was discovered in South Africa in the early 1990s by Mr. A.G. (Dries) Joubert. It is a chance seedling of unknown parentage.
- 'Pinkerton': First grown on the Pinkerton Ranch in Saticoy, California, in the early 1970s, 'Pinkerton' is a seedling of 'Hass' x 'Rincon'. The large fruit has a small seed, and its green skin deepens in color as it ripens. The thick flesh has a smooth, creamy texture, pale green color, good flavor, and high oil content. It shows some cold tolerance, to −1 °C (30 °F) and bears consistently heavy crops. A hybrid Guatemalan type, it has excellent peeling characteristics.
- 'Reed': Developed from a chance seedling found in 1948 by James S. Reed in California, this cultivar has large, round, green fruit with a smooth texture and dark, thick, glossy skin. Smooth and delicate, the flesh has a slightly nutty flavor. The skin ripens green. A Guatemalan type, it is hardy to −1 °C (30 °F). Tree size is about 5 by 4 m (16 1/2 by 13 ft).

==== B cultivars ====
- 'Fuerte': Commercialized in the U.S. from budwood imported from Atlixco, Mexico in 1911, Fuerte was the dominant commercial variety in the U.S. for the first half of the 20th century.
- 'Sharwil': Developed by James Cockburn Wilson (died 1990) with Frank Victor Sharpe in Tamborine Mountain, Queensland, Australia, in the 1950s, a portmanteau of Sharpe and Wilson. Wilson also developed the Willard variety (Wilson and Hazzard), imported the Reed variety into Australia, and developed the Shepard variety. Sharpe OBE was later awarded a CMG in 1972 for services to the avocado industry. The variety originated in Guatemala.

==== Other cultivars ====
Other avocado cultivars include 'Spinks'. Historically attested varieties (which may or may not survive among horticulturists) include the 'Challenge', 'Dickinson', 'Kist', 'Queen', 'Rey', 'Royal', 'Sharpless', and 'Taft'.

==== Stoneless avocado ====
A stoneless avocado, marketed as a "cocktail avocado", which does not contain a pit, is available on a limited basis. They are five to eight centimetres long; the whole fruit may be eaten, including the skin. It is produced from an unpollinated blossom in which the seed does not develop. Seedless avocados regularly appear on trees. Known in the avocado industry as "cukes", they are usually discarded commercially due to their small size.

=== Production ===
Avocado production 2024, millions of tonnes
Mexico	2.76
Colombia	1.27
Dominican Republic	1.23
Peru	0.92
Indonesia	0.92
Kenya	0.59
World	11.22
Source: FAOSTAT of the United Nations

In 2024, world production of avocados was 11.2 million tonnes, led by Mexico with 25% of the total (table). Other significant producers were Colombia, Dominican Republic, Peru, and Indonesia.

Avocado production

Avocado yield

=== International market ===
A 2024 market analysis indicated that avocado exports will increase over the next five years with as many as 30 countries producing avocados, possibly becoming the world's most traded fruit by 2030.

== Toxicity ==
=== Allergies ===
Some people have allergic reactions to avocado. There are two main forms of allergy: those with a tree-pollen allergy develop local symptoms in the mouth and throat shortly after eating avocado; the second, known as latex-fruit syndrome, is related to latex allergy and symptoms include generalised urticaria, abdominal pain, and vomiting and can sometimes be life-threatening.

=== Toxicity to animals ===
Avocado leaves, bark, skin, or pit are documented to be harmful to animals; cats, dogs, cattle, goats, rabbits, rats, guinea pigs, birds, fish, and horses can be severely harmed or even killed when they consume them. The avocado fruit is poisonous to some birds, and the American Society for the Prevention of Cruelty to Animals (ASPCA) lists it as toxic to horses.

Avocado leaves contain a toxic fatty acid derivative, persin, which in sufficient quantity can cause colic in horses and without veterinary treatment, death. The symptoms include gastrointestinal irritation, vomiting, diarrhea, respiratory distress, congestion, fluid accumulation around the tissues of the heart, and even death. Birds also seem to be particularly sensitive to this toxic compound.

The leaves of the Guatemalan variety of P. americana are toxic to goats, sheep, and horses.

== Uses ==
=== Nutrition ===
Avocados, raw
Nutritional value per 100 g (3.5 oz)
- Energy: 670 kJ (160 kcal)
- Carbohydrates: 8.53 g
- Sugars: 0.66 g
- Dietary fiber: 6.7 g
- Fat: 14.66 g
- Saturated: 2.13 g
- Monounsaturated: 9.80 g
- Polyunsaturated: 1.82 g
- Protein: 2 g
Vitamins and minerals
Vitamins	Quantity %DV^{†}
Vitamin A equiv. beta-Carotene lutein zeaxanthin	1% 7 μg 1% 62 μg 271 μg
Thiamine (B1)	6% 0.067 mg
Riboflavin (B2)	10% 0.13 mg
Niacin (B3)	11% 1.738 mg
Pantothenic acid (B5)	28% 1.389 mg
Vitamin B6	15% 0.257 mg
Folate (B9)	20% 81 μg
Vitamin C	11% 10 mg
Vitamin E	14% 2.07 mg
Vitamin K	18% 21 μg
Minerals	Quantity %DV^{†}
Calcium	1% 12 mg
Iron	3% 0.55 mg
Magnesium	7% 29 mg
Manganese	6% 0.142 mg
Phosphorus	4% 52 mg
Potassium	16% 485 mg
Sodium	0% 7 mg
Zinc	6% 0.64 mg
- Other constituents: Quantity
- Water: 73.23 g
- Fluoride: 7 µg
- Beta-sitosterol: 76 mg
- Link to USDA Database entry
- ^{†}Percentages estimated using US recommendations for adults, except for potassium, which is estimated based on expert recommendation from the National Academies.

Raw avocado flesh is 73% water, 15% fat, 9% carbohydrates, and 2% protein (table). In a 100-gram reference amount, avocado supplies 670 kilojoules (160 kilocalories), and is a rich source (20% or more of the Daily Value, DV) of several B vitamins (such as 28% DV in pantothenic acid) and vitamin K (20% DV), with moderate contents (10–19% DV) of vitamin C, vitamin E, and potassium. Avocados also contain phytosterols and carotenoids, such as lutein and zeaxanthin.

==== Fat composition ====
Avocados have diverse fats:

- About 75% of an avocado's energy comes from fat, most of which (67% of total fat) is monounsaturated fat as oleic acid (USDA reference in table).
- Other predominant fats include palmitic acid and linoleic acid.
- The saturated fat content amounts to 14% of the total fat.
- Typical total fat composition is roughly: 1% omega-3, 14% omega-6, 71% omega-9 (65% oleic and 6% palmitoleic), and 14% saturated fat (palmitic acid).

Although costly to produce, nutrient-rich avocado oil has a multitude of uses for salads or cooking and in cosmetics and soap products.

==== Research ====
Reviews of clinical research found that avocado consumption may lower blood levels of low-density lipoprotein and total cholesterol, two biomarkers of cardiovascular disease.

=== Culinary ===
The fruit of horticultural cultivars has a markedly higher fat content than most other fruit, mostly monounsaturated fat, and as such serves as an important staple in the diet of consumers who have limited access to other fatty foods (high-fat meats and fish, dairy products). Having a high smoke point, avocado oil is expensive compared to common salad and cooking oils, and is mostly used for salads or dips.

A ripe avocado yields to gentle pressure when held in the palm of the hand and squeezed. The flesh is prone to enzymatic browning, quickly turning brown after exposure to air. To prevent this, lime or lemon juice can be added to avocados after peeling.

The fruit is not sweet, but distinctly and subtly flavored, with smooth texture. It is used in both savory and sweet dishes, though in many countries not for both. The avocado is common in vegetarian cuisine as a substitute for meats in sandwiches and salads because of its high fat content.

Generally, avocado is served raw, though some cultivars, including the common 'Hass', can be cooked for a short time without becoming bitter. The flesh of some avocados may be rendered inedible by heat. Prolonged cooking induces this chemical reaction in all cultivars.

It is used as the base for the Mexican dip known as guacamole, as well as a spread on corn tortillas or toast, served with spices. Avocado is a primary ingredient in avocado soup. Avocado slices are frequently added to hamburgers and tortas and is a key ingredient in California rolls and other makizushi ("maki", or rolled sushi).

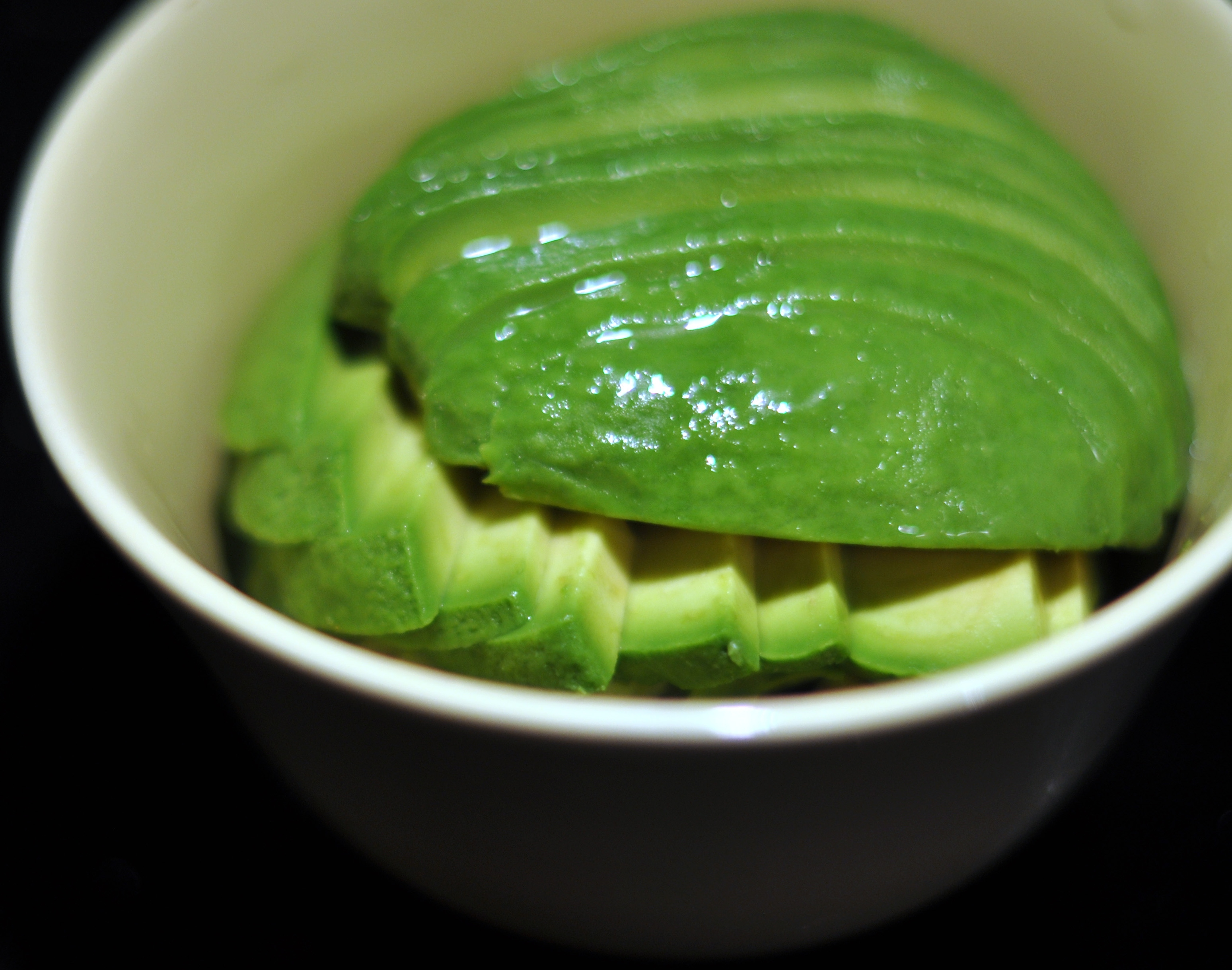
Sliced avocado

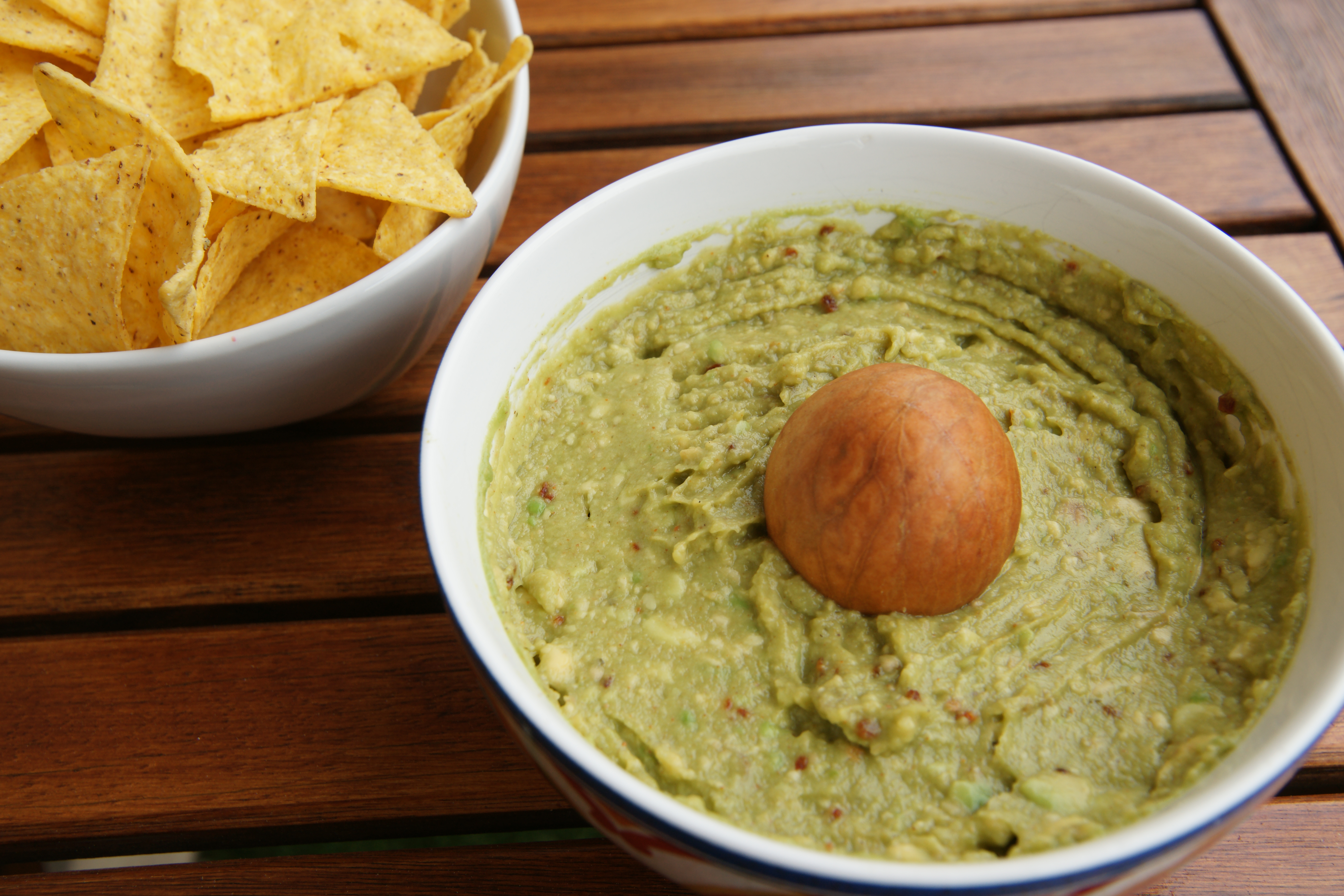
A guacamole mix (right) used as a dip for tortilla chips (left)

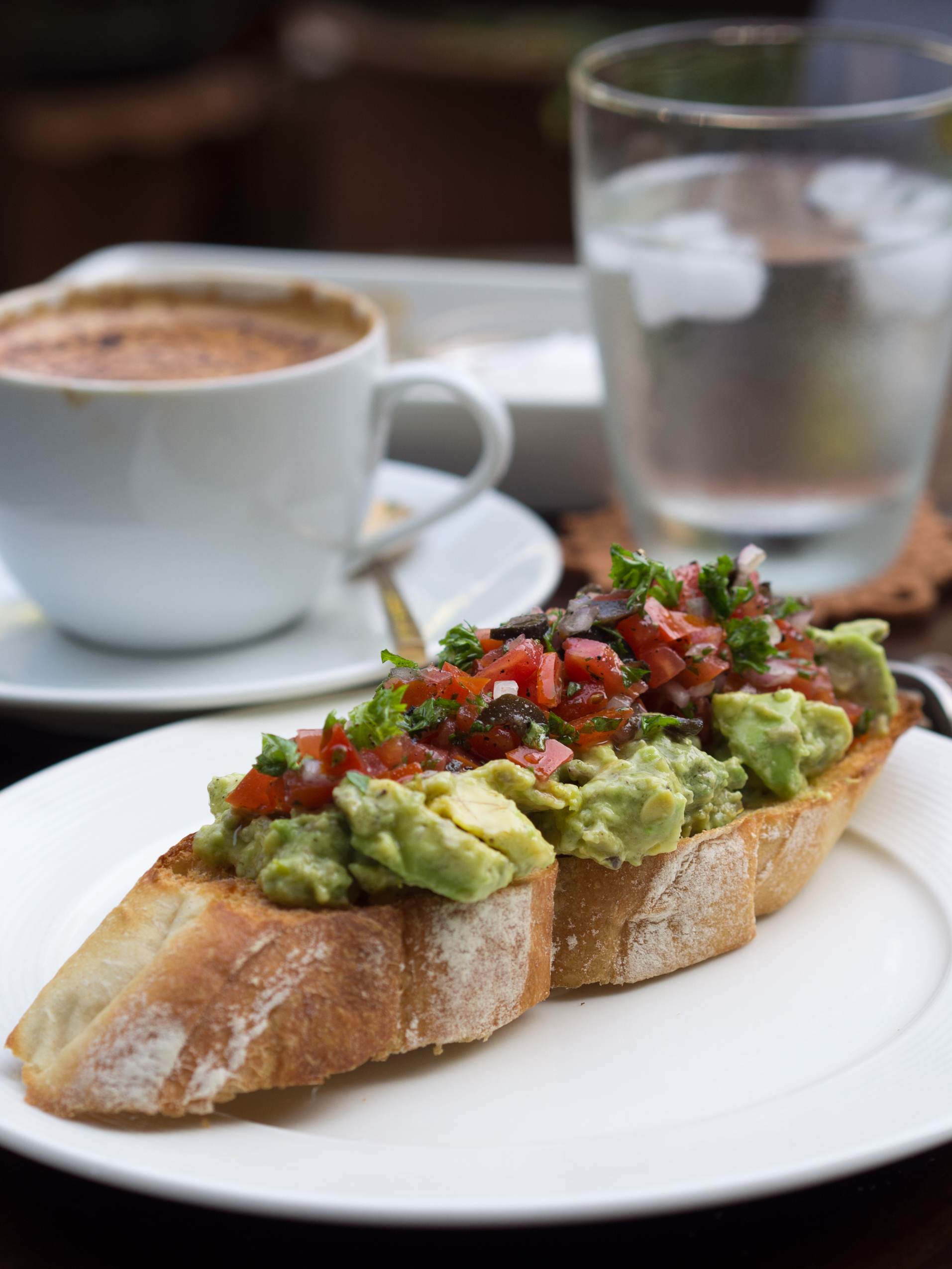
Avocado toast

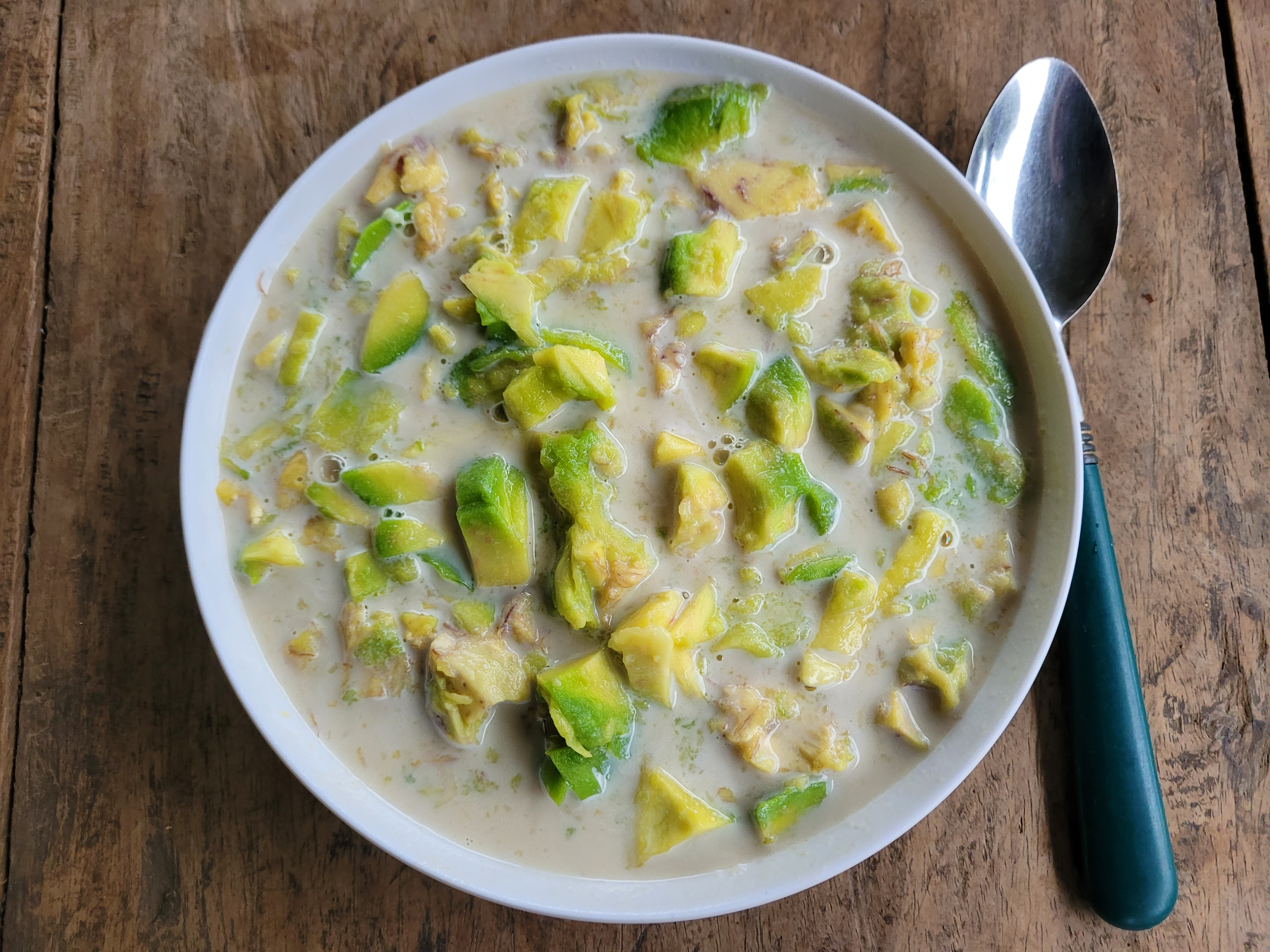
Avocado in milk and sugar, a traditional dish from the Philippines

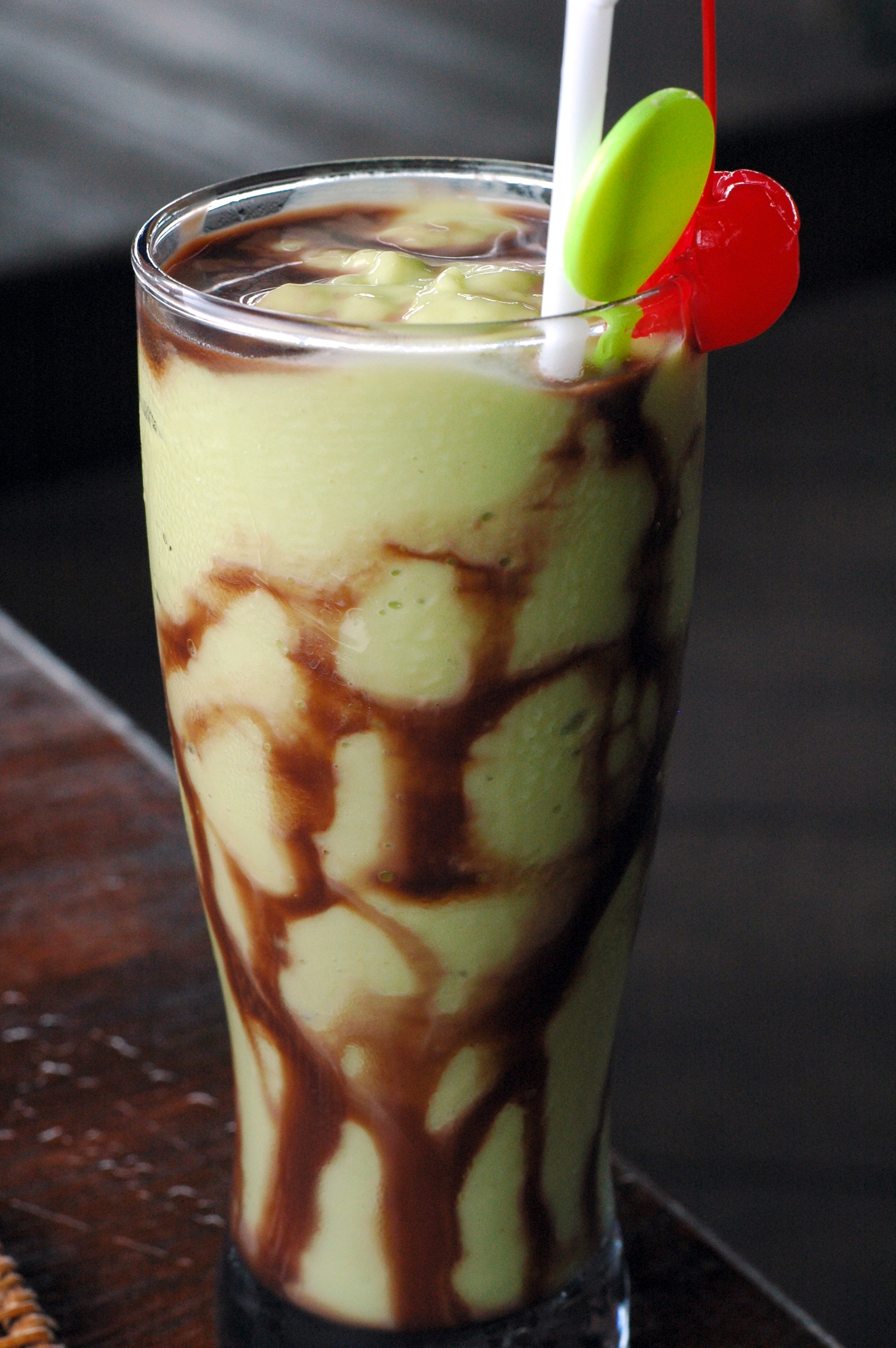
Indonesian-style milkshake with chocolate syrup

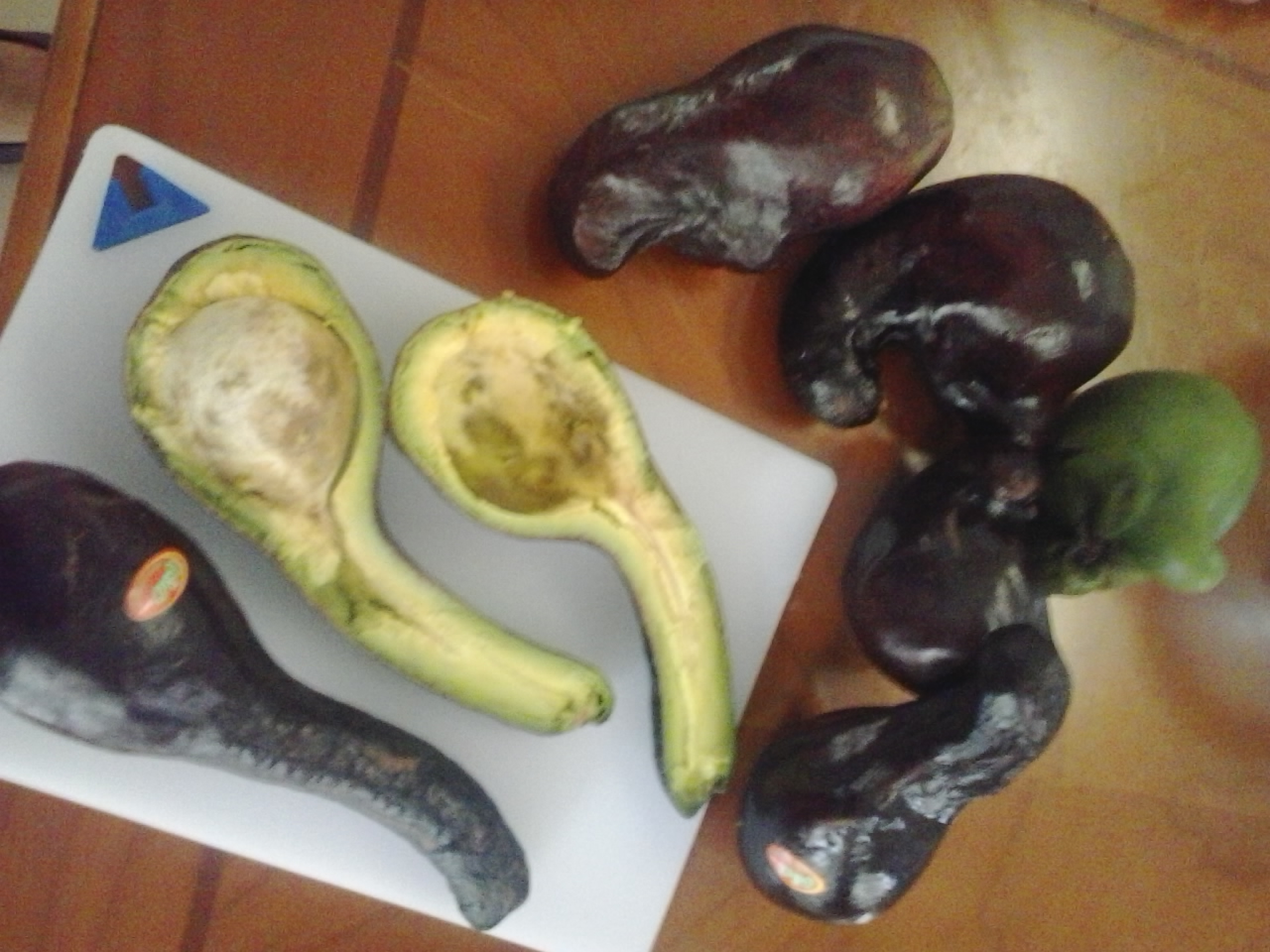
Unusual avocado variety from Cebu, Philippines

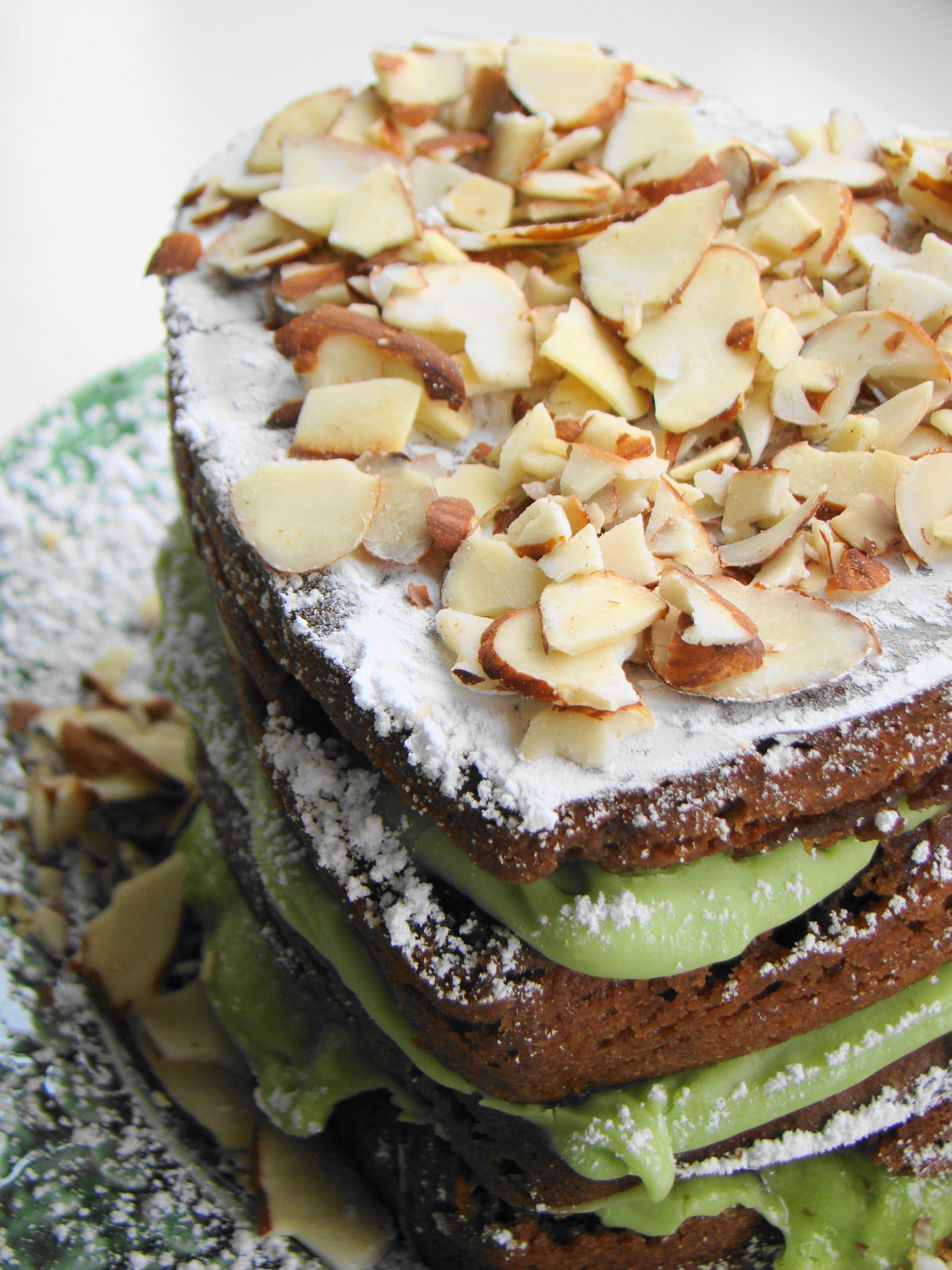
A mocha almond fudge avocado layer cake

==== Hand injury ====
When trying to serve the avocado fruit by cutting into it, people sometimes cut their hand severely. The term 'avocado hand' has been coined for this injury. The prevalence of these injuries increased in the United States between 1998 and 2017 as avocado consumption increased.

=== International ===
In Mexico and Central America, avocados are served mixed with white rice, in soups, salads, or on the side of chicken and meat. They are also commonly added to pozole. In Peru, they are consumed with tequeños as mayonnaise, served as a side dish with parrillas, used in salads and sandwiches, or as a whole dish when filled with tuna, shrimp, or chicken. In Chile, it is used as a puree-like sauce with chicken, hamburgers, and hot dogs; and in slices for celery or lettuce salads. The Chilean version of Caesar salad contains large slices of mature avocado. Avocado forms the base of guasacaca, a sauce found in Venezuela and the Dominican Republic.

Avocados in savory dishes, often seen as exotic, are a relative novelty in Portuguese-speaking countries, such as Brazil, where the traditional preparation is mashed with sugar and lime, and eaten as a dessert or snack. This contrasts with Spanish-speaking countries such as Chile, Mexico, or Argentina, where the opposite is true and sweet preparations are rare, with the exception of the Philippines, a former Spanish colony where avocados are traditionally used in sweet preparations and savory uses are seen as exotic.

In the Philippines (where avocados were introduced from Mexico since before the 1700s), Brazil, Indonesia, Vietnam, and southern India (especially the coastal Kerala, Tamil Nadu and Karnataka region), avocados are frequently used for milkshakes and occasionally added to ice cream and other desserts. In Brazil, the Philippines Vietnam, and Indonesia, a dessert drink is made with sugar, milk or water, and pureed avocado. Chocolate syrup is sometimes added. In Morocco, a similar chilled avocado and milk drink is sweetened with confectioner's sugar and flavored with a touch of orange flower water.

In Ethiopia, avocados are made into juice by mixing them with sugar and milk or water, usually served with Vimto and a slice of lemon. It is also common to serve layered multiple fruit juices in a glass (locally called Spris) made of avocados, mangoes, bananas, guavas, and papayas. Avocados are also used to make salads. In Kenya and Nigeria, the avocado is often eaten as a fruit alone or mixed with other fruits in a fruit salad, or as part of a vegetable salad. In Ghana, they are often eaten alone on sliced bread as a sandwich. In Sri Lanka, their well-ripened flesh, thoroughly mashed or pureed with milk and kitul treacle (a liquid jaggery made from the sap of the inflorescence of jaggery palms), is a common dessert. In Haiti, they are often consumed with cassava or regular bread for breakfast.

In the United Kingdom, the avocado became available during the 1960s when introduced by Sainsbury's under the name 'avocado pear'. Much of the success of avocados in the UK is attributed to a long-running promotional campaign initiated by South African growers in 1995. In Australia and New Zealand, avocados are commonly served on sandwiches, sushi, toast, or with chicken.

=== Leaves ===
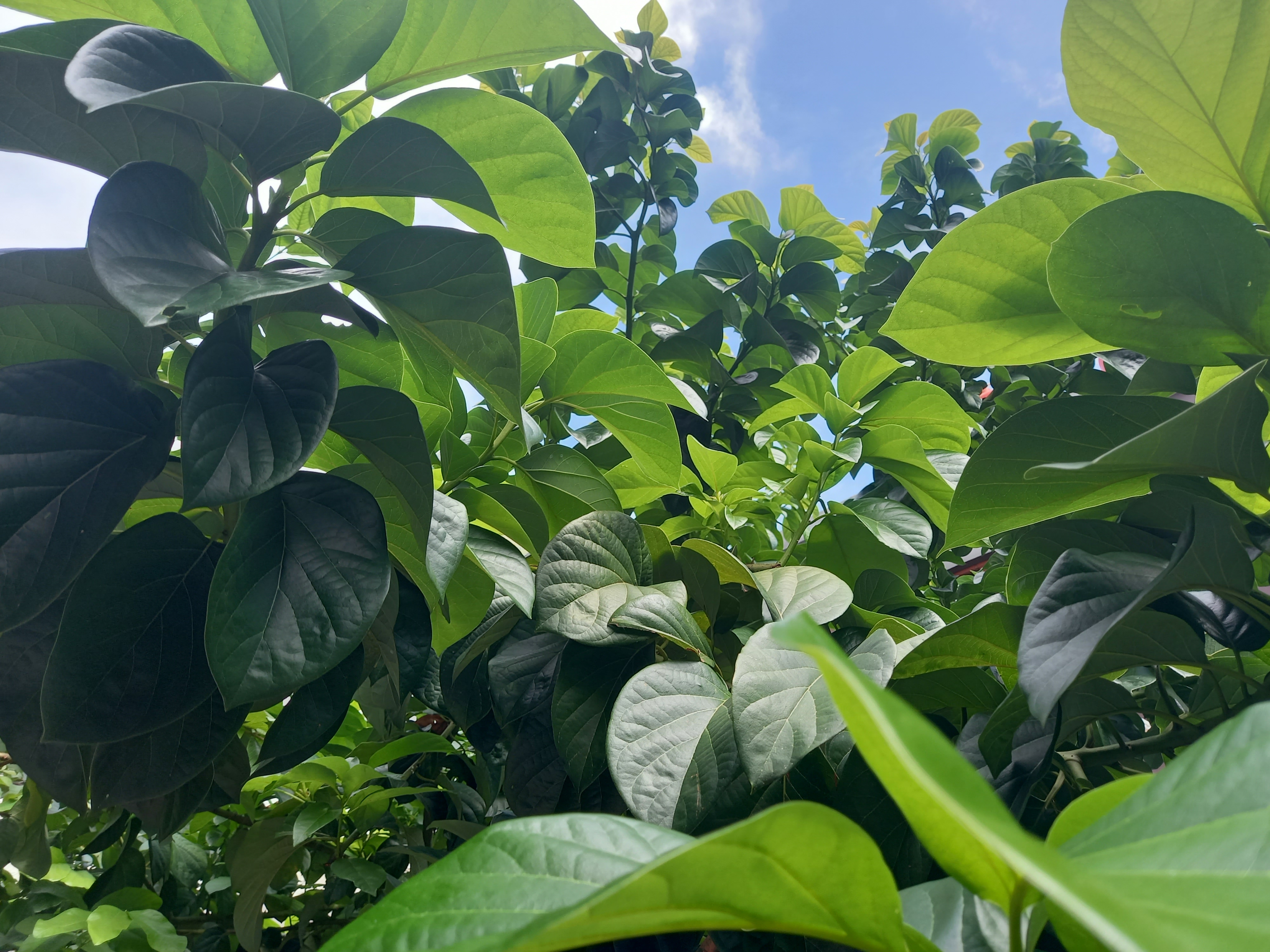
Avocado has elliptical-shaped leaves.

In addition to the fruit, the leaves of Mexican avocados (Persea americana var. drymifolia) are used in some cuisines as a spice, with a flavor somewhat reminiscent of anise. They are sold both dried and fresh, toasted before use, and either crumbled or used whole, commonly in bean dishes.

=== Tea ===
Avocado plants can be used to make tea from either the leaves or seeds.

== See also ==
- California Avocado Commission
- California Avocado Society
- Florida Lime & Avocado Growers, Inc. v. Paul
- List of avocado dishes
- Plant propagation
- Recalcitrant seed
