= Choquette (surname) =

Choquette is a surname. Notable people with the surname include:

- Adrienne Choquette (1915–1973), Canadian novelist
- Auguste Choquette (born 1932), Member of Parliament for Lotbinière
- Buck Choquette (1830–1898), Canadian prospector
- Ernest Choquette (1862–1941), Canadian politician
- Fernand Choquette, (1895–1975) former judge of the Quebec Court of Appeal
- Hector Choquette (1884–1959), Member of the Legislative Assembly of Quebec
- Jack Choquette (1928–2013), American racing driver
- Jeff Choquette (born 1986), American racing driver
- Jérôme Choquette (1928–2017), Member of the Legislative Assembly of Quebec
- Joseph-Armand Choquette (1905–1999), Canadian politician
- Lionel Choquette (1906–1983), Canadian politician
- Ludovick Choquette (born 2001), Canadian football player
- Michel Choquette (born 1938), Canadian humorist
- Natalie Choquette (born 1959), Canadian soprano
- Philippe-Auguste Choquette, (1854–1948), Member of Parliament for Montmagny
- Robert Choquette (1905–1991), Canadian writer and diplomat
- Robert Choquette (rowing) (born 1954), Canadian rower
