= Choquette (avocado) =

Avocado cultivar

Persea americana 'Choquette'
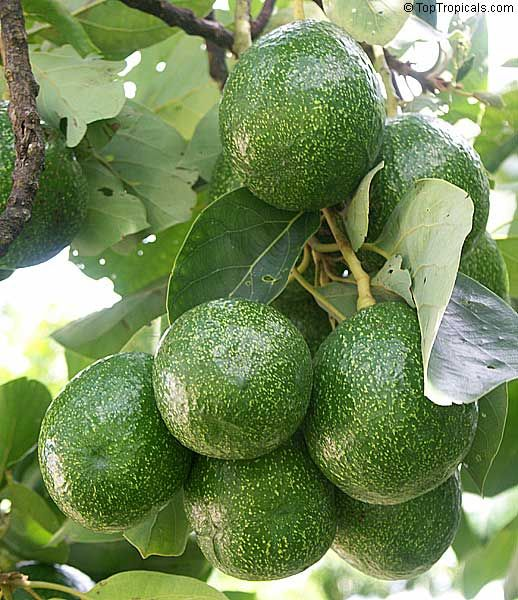
- Genus: Persea
- Species: Persea americana
- Hybrid parentage: Likely a cross between Guatemalan and West Indian types
- Cultivar: 'Choquette'
- Breeder: Remi D. Choquette Sr.
- Origin: Miami, Florida, 1929

The Choquette avocado is a named commercial cultivar of avocado that originated in South Florida.

== History ==
The original tree grew from a seed planted on the property of Remi D. Choquette Sr. in Miami, Florida, in January 1929, and was likely the result of a cross between Guatemalan and West Indian types. The tree first fruited in 1934, and propagation began in 1939.

'Choquette' bore large fruit of good eating quality in large quantities and had good disease resistance, and thus became a major cultivar. Today 'Choquette' is widely propagated in Florida both for commercial growing and for home growing.

'Choquette' trees are planted in the collections of the USDA's germplasm repository in Miami, the University of Florida's Tropical Research and Education Center in Homestead, Florida, and the Miami-Dade Fruit and Spice Park, also in Homestead.

== Description ==
The fruit is very large, averaging 30–40 ounces (850–1100 grams) in weight, with an oval shape. It has glossy, smooth, green skin. Oil content of the fruit is approximately 13%. In Florida, the fruit mature from October to January. 'Choquette' trees produce A-type flowers.
