= A. birmanus =

A. birmanus may refer to:

- Abacetus birmanus, a ground beetle
- Aclees birmanus, a weevil found in India and Sri Lanka
