= Pheloconus hispidus =

Scientific classification
- Kingdom: Animalia
- Phylum: Arthropoda
- Class: Insecta
- Order: Coleoptera
- Suborder: Polyphaga
- Infraorder: Cucujiformia
- Family: Curculionidae
- Subfamily: Molytinae
- Tribe: Conotrachelini
- Genus: Pheloconus
- Species: P. hispidus

Binomial name
- Pheloconus hispidus (LeConte, 1876)

Species of beetle

Pheloconus hispidus is a species of beetle in the family Curculionidae. It is found in North America.
