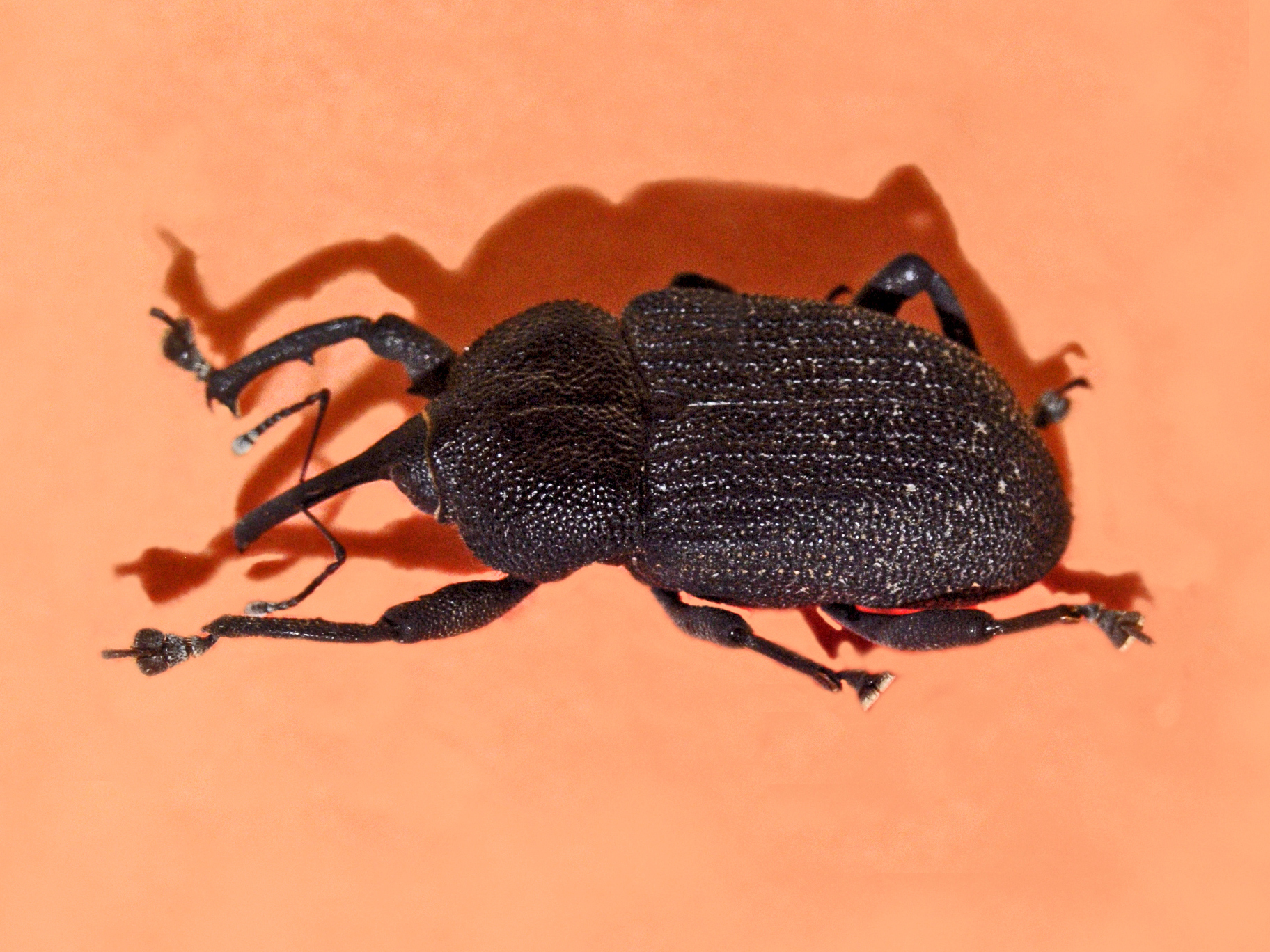
- Museum specimen of Homalinotus colossus

Scientific classification
- Kingdom: Animalia
- Phylum: Arthropoda
- Class: Insecta
- Order: Coleoptera
- Suborder: Polyphaga
- Infraorder: Cucujiformia
- Family: Curculionidae
- Subfamily: Molytinae
- Tribe: Cholini
- Genus: Homalinotus; Schönherr, 1823

= Homalinotus =

Genus of beetles

Homalinotus is a genus of weevils belonging to the family Curculionidae.

== Species ==
- Homalinotus angulatus
- Homalinotus aragaoi
- Homalinotus bolivianus
- Homalinotus calcaratus
- Homalinotus circumdatus
- Homalinotus colosseus
- Homalinotus colossus
- Homalinotus complanatus
- Homalinotus compressus
- Homalinotus conspergatus
- Homalinotus coriaceus (black coconut bunch weevil)
- Homalinotus cyanicollis
- Homalinotus densatus
- Homalinotus deplanatus
- Homalinotus depressus
- Homalinotus distinctus
- Homalinotus fasciatus
- Homalinotus giganteus
- Homalinotus humeralis
- Homalinotus hystrix
- Homalinotus indus
- Homalinotus inermicrus
- Homalinotus jamaicensis
- Homalinotus lherminieri
- Homalinotus lugubris
- Homalinotus matogrossensis
- Homalinotus nodipennis
- Homalinotus perplexus
- Homalinotus platynotus
- Homalinotus porosus
- Homalinotus tristis
- Homalinotus umbilicatus
- Homalinotus validus
