= Irenarchus =

Irenarchus, Irinarchus, Irenarch, Irinarch, Irenarchos, Irinarchos, from Greek: Είρήναρχος is a given name. Notable people with the name include:

- Irenarch of Rostov
- Irenarch of Solovki (died 1628), hegumen of the Solovetsky Monastery

== Biology ==
- Irenarchus (beetle) is a genus of weevils in the tribe Cholini
