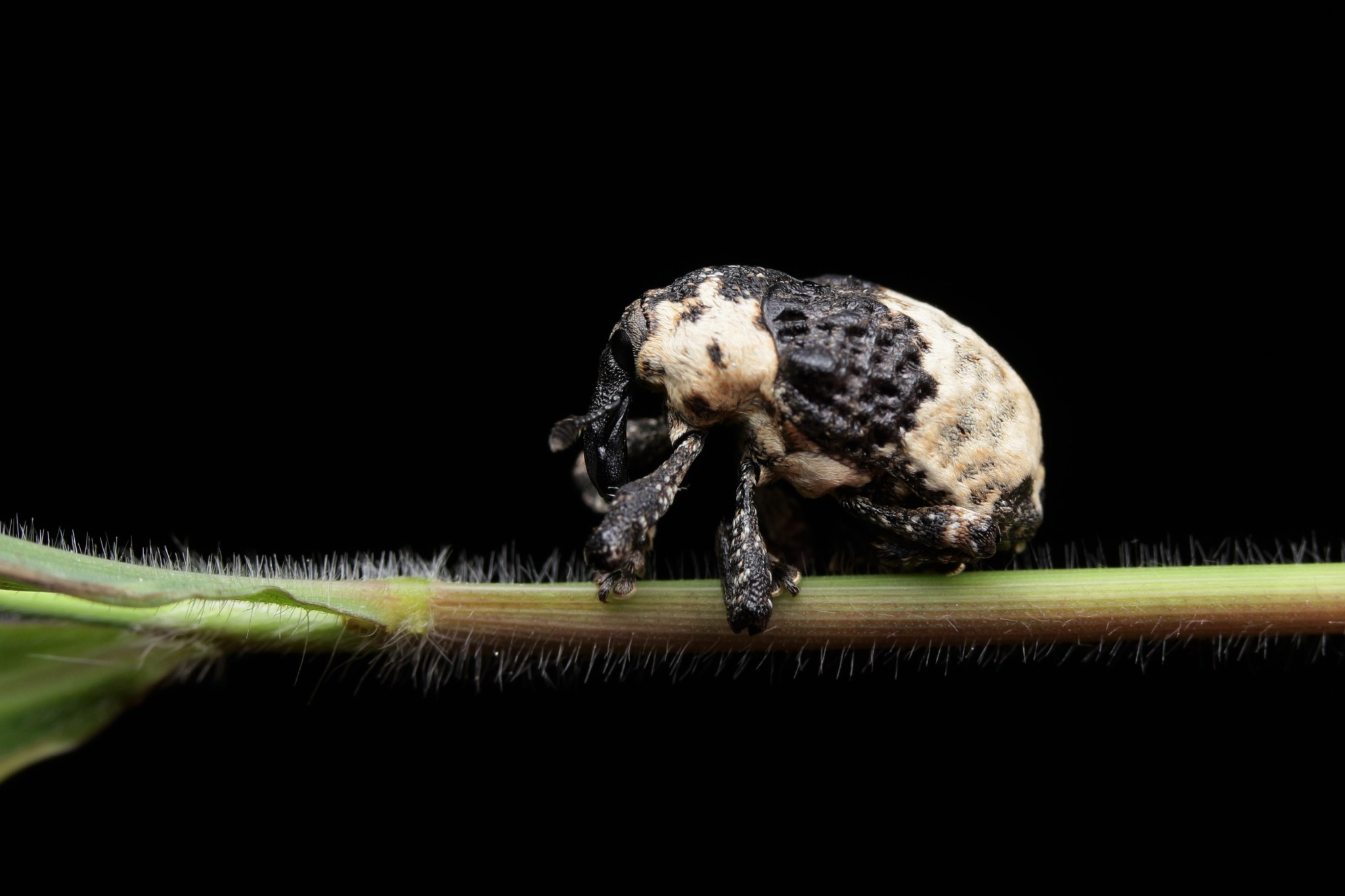
- Sternuchopsis trifida, China

Scientific classification
- Kingdom: Animalia
- Phylum: Arthropoda
- Clade: Pancrustacea
- Class: Insecta
- Order: Coleoptera
- Suborder: Polyphaga
- Infraorder: Cucujiformia
- Superfamily: Curculionoidea
- Family: Curculionidae
- Subfamily: Molytinae
- Tribe: Mecysolobini
- Genus: Sternuchopsis; K.M.Heller, 1918

= Sternuchopsis =

Genus of beetles

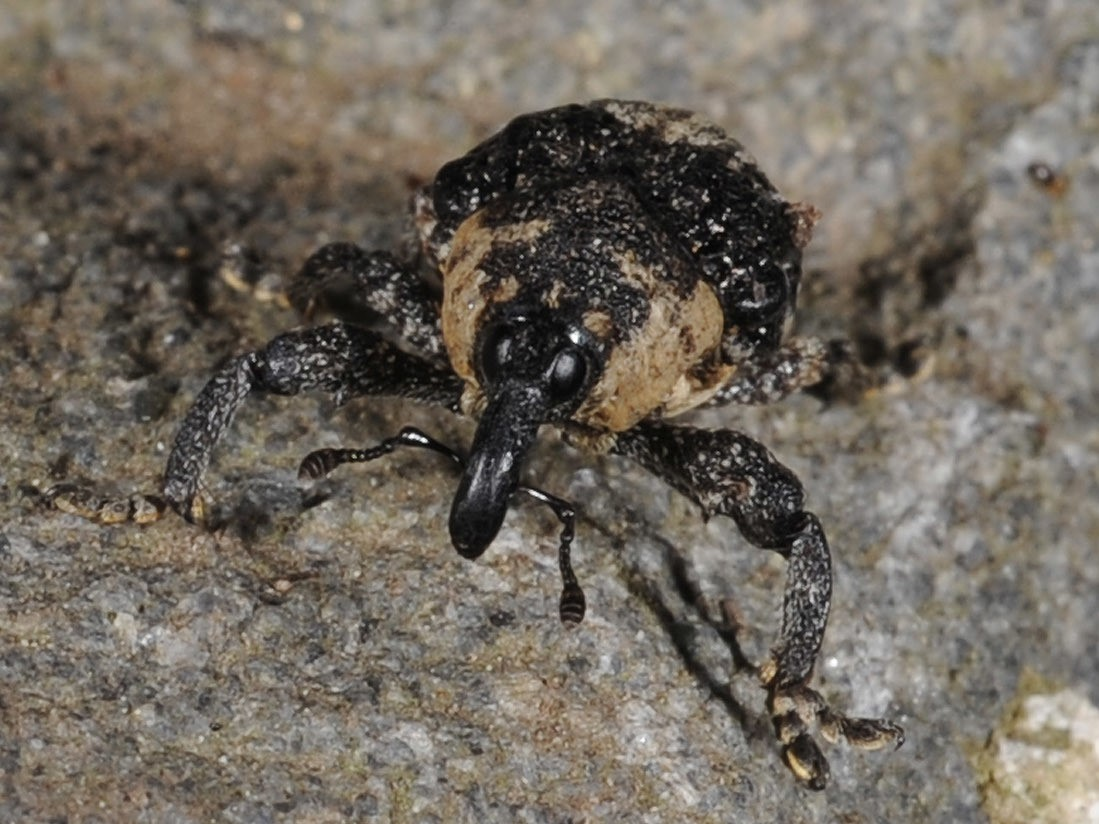
Sternuchopsis trifida, South Korea

Sternuchopsis is a genus of true weevil in the beetle family Curculionidae.
