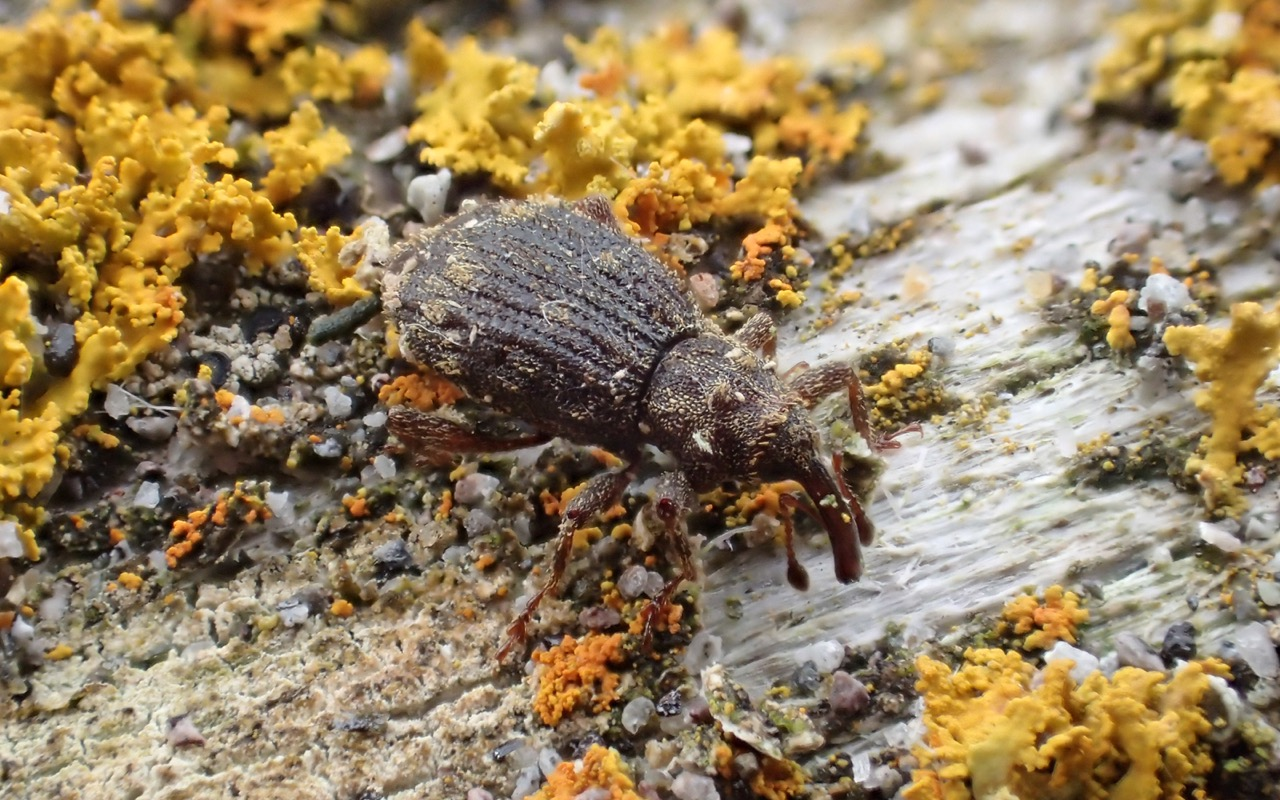

Scientific classification
- Domain: Eukaryota
- Kingdom: Animalia
- Phylum: Arthropoda
- Class: Insecta
- Order: Coleoptera
- Suborder: Polyphaga
- Infraorder: Cucujiformia
- Family: Curculionidae
- Subfamily: Molytinae
- Tribe: Molytini
- Genus: Sthereus
- Species: S. ptinoides

Binomial name
- Sthereus ptinoides (Germar, 1824)

Synonyms
- Sthereus borealis Motschulsky, 1845; Sthereus fasciculatus Motschulsky, 1845

= Sthereus ptinoides =

Species of beetle

Sthereus ptinoides is a species of beetles in the family Curculionidae. It is found in North America.
