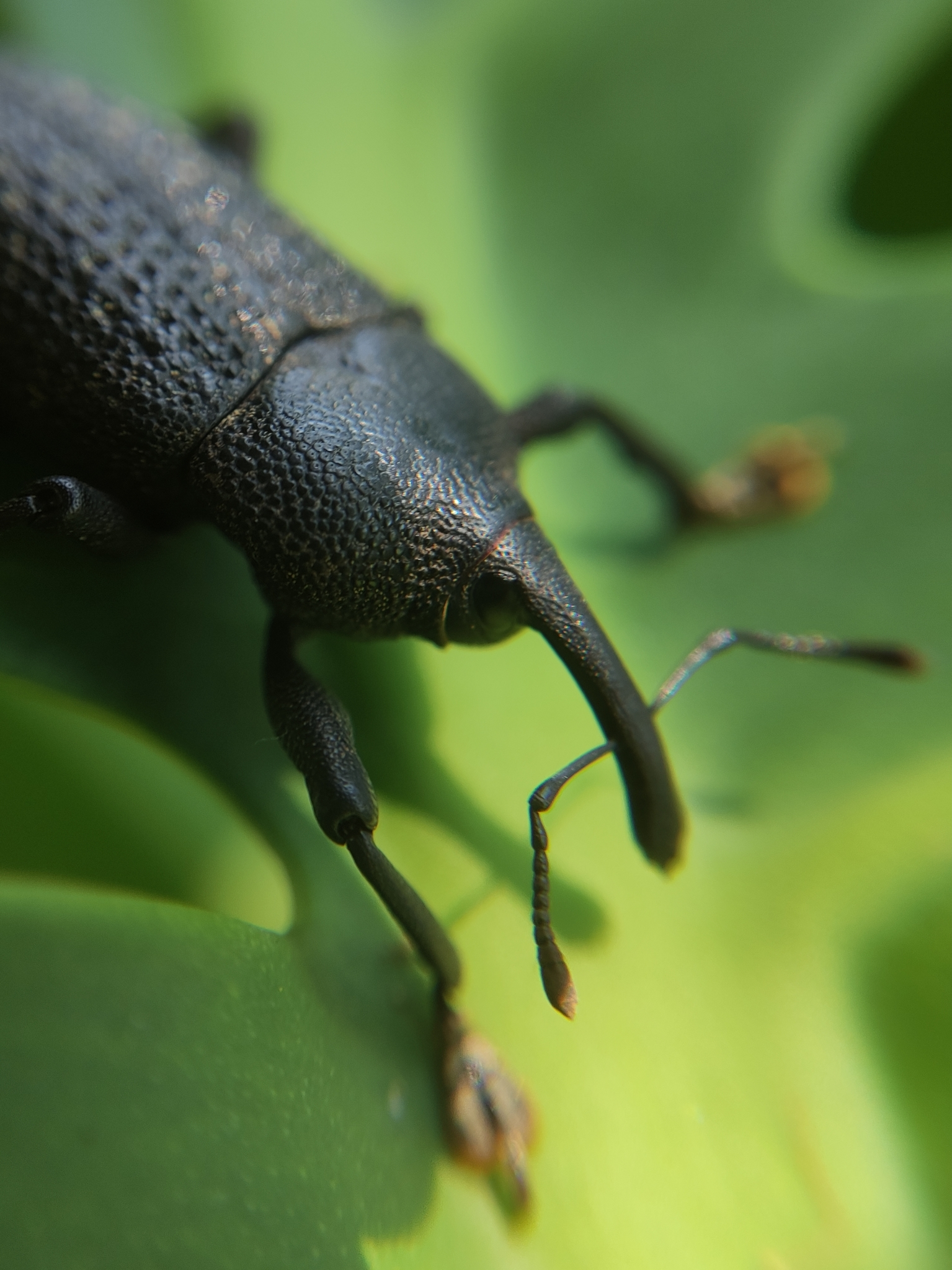

Scientific classification
- Kingdom: Animalia
- Phylum: Arthropoda
- Clade: Pancrustacea
- Class: Insecta
- Order: Coleoptera
- Suborder: Polyphaga
- Infraorder: Cucujiformia
- Family: Curculionidae
- Genus: Homalinotus
- Species: H. coriaceus

Binomial name
- Homalinotus coriaceus Gyllenhal, 1836

= Homalinotus coriaceus =

Species of beetle

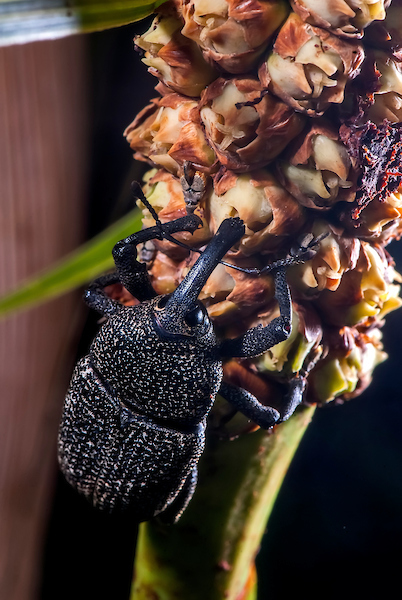
H. coriaceus feeding on the floral peduncle

Homalinotus coriaceus, the black coconut bunch weevil, is a species of weevil belonging to the family Curculionidae. This species is found in Brazil and is considered a pest because it feeds on cultivated coconuts.

== Ecology ==
Due to the damage H. coriaceus can inflict on coconut trees, it is considered a major pest in Brazil. Larvae will tunnel into the peduncles of the coconut tree, feeding on sap. Likewise, adults will often damage the flowers and fruit tissues. H. coriaceus has been estimated to have reduced coconut production in Brazil by around 50%.

== Morphology ==
Black coconut bunch weevils are black and range between 25 and 30 millimetres (0.98 and 1.18 in) long with a rostrum of approximately 8 millimetres (0.31 in), the mature larvae are white, curved, bigger than the adult-beetle with 40 to 50 millimetres (1.6 to 2.0 in) in length and display a rust-tinted head. The eggs laid on the floral peduncle are white, smooth, and elongated. This species has little to no sexual dimorphism, where females are a bit larger than males and have two subtle indentations on the pronotum.
