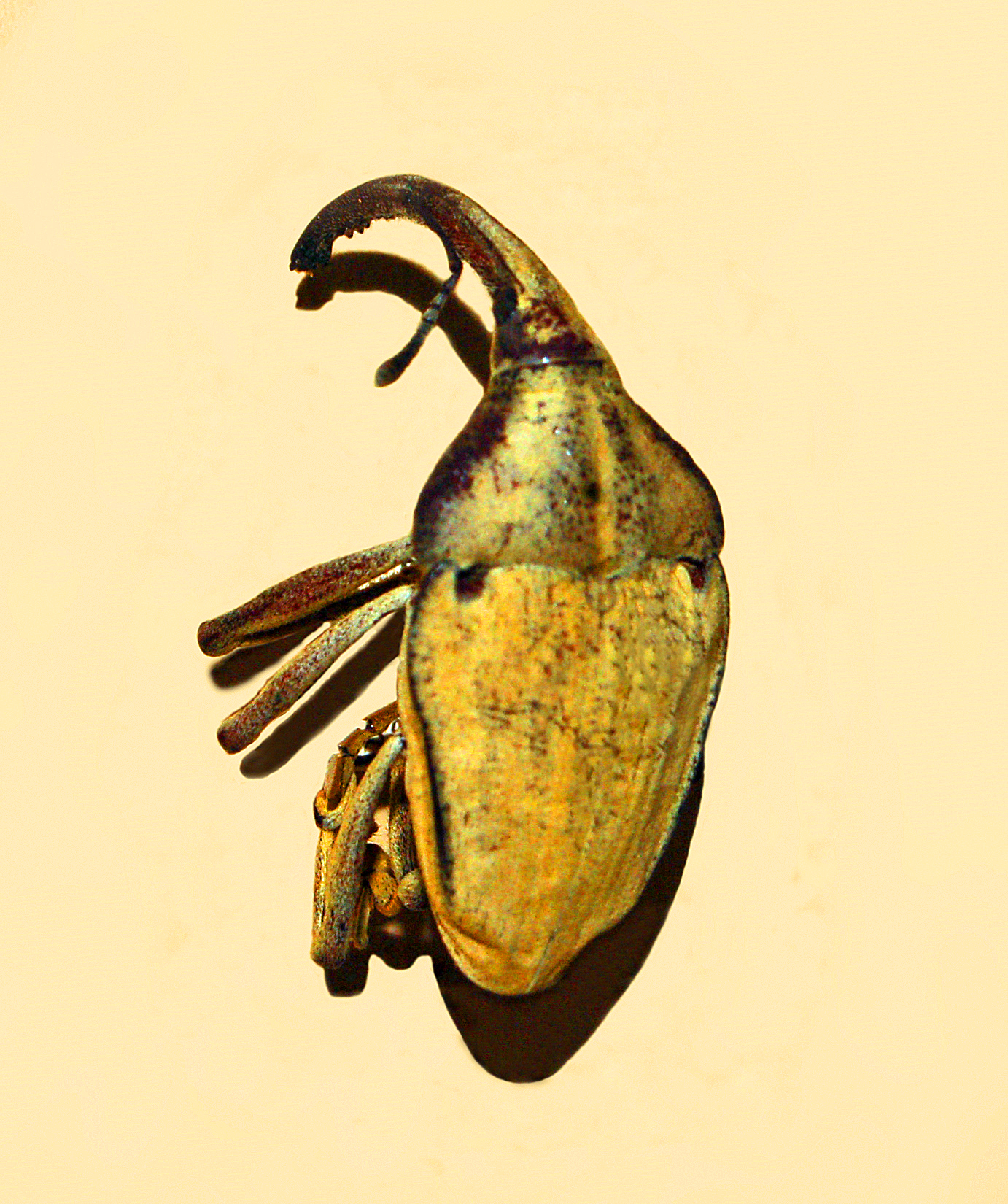
- Rhinastus sternicornis from Brazil

Scientific classification
- Kingdom: Animalia
- Phylum: Arthropoda
- Clade: Pancrustacea
- Class: Insecta
- Order: Coleoptera
- Suborder: Polyphaga
- Infraorder: Cucujiformia
- Superfamily: Curculionoidea
- Family: Curculionidae
- Subfamily: Molytinae
- Tribe: Cholini
- Genus: Rhinastus; Schoenherr, 1826

= Rhinastus =

Genus of beetles

Rhinastus is a genus of beetles belonging to the family Curculionidae.

== Description ==
The species of this genus are generally large and broad weevils, quite flattened, yellowish, with very long beaks and legs and a striking sexual dimorphism.

== List of species ==
- Rhinastus elephas Dupont in Dejean, P.F.M.A., 1836
- Rhinastus granulatus Roelofs, W., 1879
- Rhinastus latisternus Guérin-Méneville, 1844
- Rhinastus scolopax Dejean, P.F.M.A.
- Rhinastus sternicornis Schoenherr, 1825
