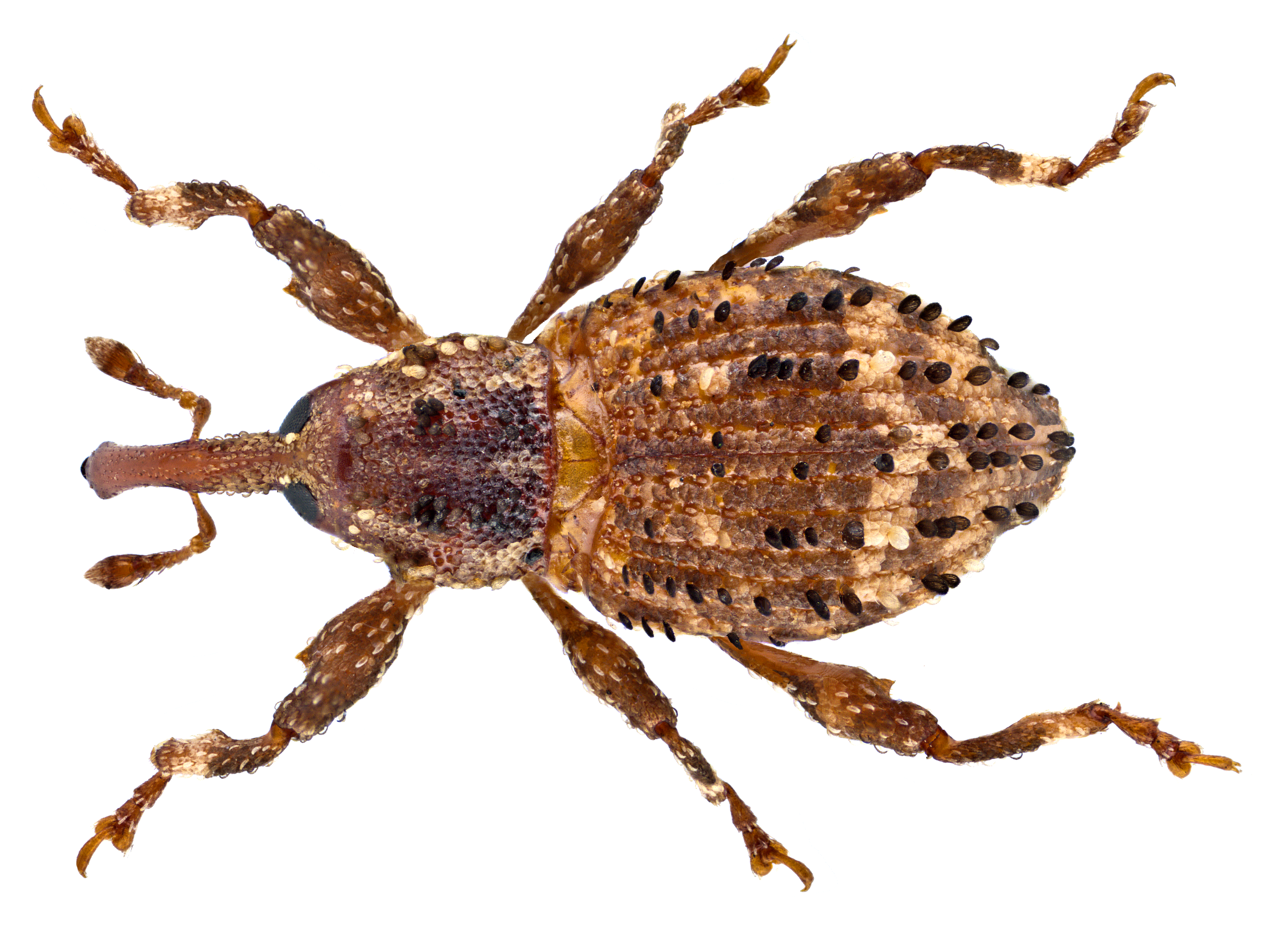
- Trachodes hispidus

Scientific classification
- Domain: Eukaryota
- Kingdom: Animalia
- Phylum: Arthropoda
- Class: Insecta
- Order: Coleoptera
- Suborder: Polyphaga
- Infraorder: Cucujiformia
- Family: Curculionidae
- Subfamily: Molytinae
- Genus: Trachodes; Germar, 1824

= Trachodes (beetle) =

Genus of beetles

Trachodes is a genus of true weevils in the family of beetles known as Curculionidae. There are at least 30 described species in Trachodes.

== Species ==
These 32 species belong to the genus Trachodes:

- Trachodes acanthion Schenkling, S. & Marshall, G. A. K, 1937^{c}
- Trachodes acutangulus Heller, K.M., 1908^{c}
- Trachodes aegypticus Tournier, H., 1873^{c}
- Trachodes albofasciatus Ter-Minasian, 1952^{c}
- Trachodes asiaticus Desbr. d. Loges, 1895^{c}
- Trachodes borealis Schenkling, S. & Marshall, G. A. K, 1937^{c}
- Trachodes contractus Klug, 1834^{c}
- Trachodes costatum Fåhraeus, O.I. in Schönherr, C.J., 1843^{c}
- Trachodes costatus Fåhraeus, 1843^{c}
- Trachodes elongatus Reitter, E., 1888^{c}
- Trachodes exsculptus Boheman, 1843^{c}
- Trachodes fasciculatus Schenkling, S. & Marshall, G. A. K, 1845^{c}
- Trachodes heydeni Stierlin, W.G., 1881^{c}
- Trachodes hispidus (Linnaeus, 1758)^{i c g b}
- Trachodes horridus Schenkling, S. & Marshall, G. A. K, 1937^{c}
- Trachodes hystrix Gyllenhal, 1836^{c}
- Trachodes kannohi Morimoto, 2001^{c}
- Trachodes laoensis Kojima, 2010^{c}
- Trachodes monticola Morimoto & Miyakawa, 1995^{c}
- Trachodes oblongus Reitter, E., 1888^{c}
- Trachodes ovatus Weise, 1879^{c}
- Trachodes ovipennis Morimoto & Miyakawa, 1995^{c}
- Trachodes penicillatus Montrouzier, 1860^{c}
- Trachodes ptinoides Germar, 1824^{c}
- Trachodes quadrituberculatns Mannerheim, C.G., 1852^{c}
- Trachodes sasajii Morimoto & Miyakawa, 1995^{c}
- Trachodes setiger Voss, 1957^{c}
- Trachodes simulator Morimoto & Miyakawa, 1995^{c}
- Trachodes squamifer Schoenherr, 1825^{c}
- Trachodes subalbicollis Kojima, 2010^{c}
- Trachodes wakaharai Kojima, 2010^{c}
- Trachodes wittmeri Pesarini, 1973^{c}

Data sources: i = ITIS, c = Catalogue of Life, g = GBIF, b = Bugguide.net
