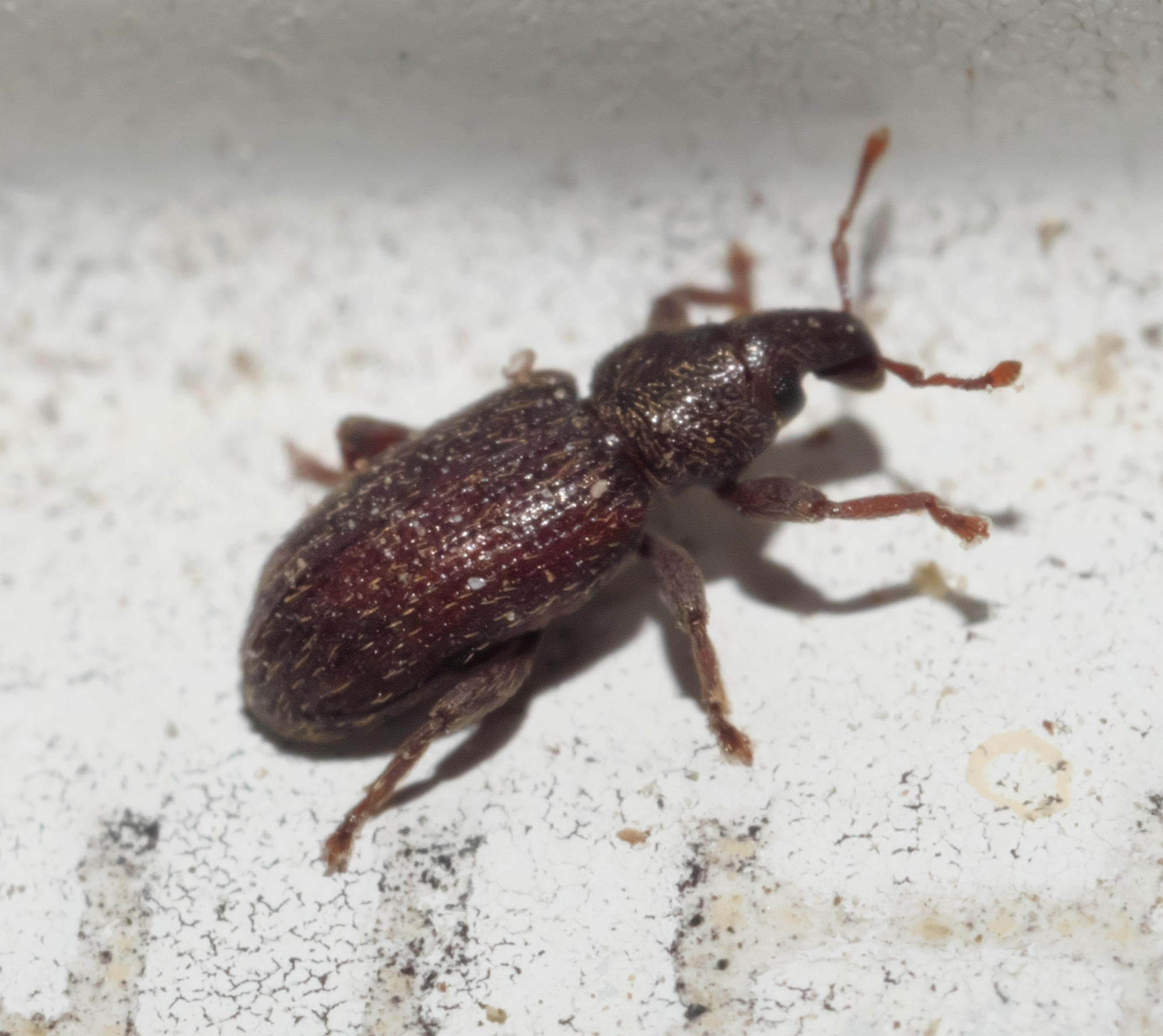
- Hormops abducens, Oklahoma

Scientific classification
- Kingdom: Animalia
- Phylum: Arthropoda
- Class: Insecta
- Order: Coleoptera
- Suborder: Polyphaga
- Infraorder: Cucujiformia
- Family: Curculionidae
- Genus: Hormops
- Species: H. abducens

Binomial name
- Hormops abducens LeConte, 1876

Synonyms
- Hormops latipennis Casey, 1924

= Hormops abducens =

Species of beetle

Hormops abducens is a species of true weevil in the beetle family Curculionidae. It is found in North America.
