= Lymantes =

Scientific classification
- Kingdom: Animalia
- Phylum: Arthropoda
- Clade: Pancrustacea
- Class: Insecta
- Order: Coleoptera
- Suborder: Polyphaga
- Infraorder: Cucujiformia
- Superfamily: Curculionoidea
- Family: Curculionidae
- Subfamily: Molytinae
- Genus: Lymantes; Schönherr, 1838

Genus of beetles

Lymantes is a genus of true weevils in the beetle family Curculionidae found in North America and Central America. They are typically found in leaf litter. Some Lymantes species are known to live in or around caves.

Weevils in the genus Lymantes generally have elongate bodies with densely punctuated dorsi and reduced or absent eyes. They are sexually dimorphic; males have more prominent scrobes and a slightly wider rostrum. The cuticles of the species range from black, to brown, to reddish in color.

The natural history of the Lymantes weevils is largely unknown.

== Species ==
These nine species belong to the genus Lymantes:

- Lymantes arkansasensis Sleeper, 1965
- Lymantes dietrichi Sleeper, 1965
- Lymantes fowleri Anderson, 2016
- Lymantes nadineae Anderson in Paquin & Anderson in Cokendolfer & Reddell (eds.), 2009
- Lymantes obrieni Anderson, 2016
- Lymantes puteolatum (Dury, 1901)
- Lymantes sandersoni Sleeper, 1965
- Lymantes scrobicollis Gyllenhal, 1838
- Lymantes squamirostris Osella, 1989
