= Emphyastes =

Scientific classification
- Domain: Eukaryota
- Kingdom: Animalia
- Phylum: Arthropoda
- Class: Insecta
- Order: Coleoptera
- Suborder: Polyphaga
- Infraorder: Cucujiformia
- Family: Curculionidae
- Subfamily: Molytinae
- Genus: Emphyastes; Mannerheim, 1852

Genus of beetles

Emphyastes is a genus of true weevils in the beetle family Curculionidae. There are at least three described species in Emphyastes.

== Species ==
These three species belong to the genus Emphyastes:

- Emphyastes fucicola Mannerheim, 1852
- Emphyastes fuscicola Mannerheim, 1852
- Emphyastes mannerheimi Egorov & Korotyaev, 1977
