= Anchonus =

Scientific classification
- Domain: Eukaryota
- Kingdom: Animalia
- Phylum: Arthropoda
- Class: Insecta
- Order: Coleoptera
- Suborder: Polyphaga
- Infraorder: Cucujiformia
- Family: Curculionidae
- Subfamily: Molytinae
- Genus: Anchonus; Schönherr, 1825

Genus of beetles

Anchonus is a genus of true weevils in the beetle family Curculionidae. There are more than 150 described species in Anchonus.

== Species ==
Species in the genus include:

- Anchonus blatchleyi Sleeper, 1954
- Anchonus duryi Blatchley, 1916
- Anchonus floridanus Schwarz, 1894
- Anchonus scrabrosus Hustache, 1929
- Anchonus suillus Guérin-Méneville, F.E., 1829-44
