= Anchonus blatchleyi =

Scientific classification
- Domain: Eukaryota
- Kingdom: Animalia
- Phylum: Arthropoda
- Class: Insecta
- Order: Coleoptera
- Suborder: Polyphaga
- Infraorder: Cucujiformia
- Family: Curculionidae
- Genus: Anchonus
- Species: A. blatchleyi

Binomial name
- Anchonus blatchleyi Sleeper, 1954

Species of beetle

Anchonus blatchleyi is a species of true weevil in the family of beetles known as Curculionidae. It is found in North America.
