= Nanus uniformis =

Scientific classification
- Kingdom: Animalia
- Phylum: Arthropoda
- Class: Insecta
- Order: Coleoptera
- Suborder: Polyphaga
- Infraorder: Cucujiformia
- Family: Curculionidae
- Genus: Nanus
- Species: N. uniformis

Binomial name
- Nanus uniformis Boheman, 1844

Synonyms
- Homaloxenus dentipes Wollaston, 1873

Species of beetle

Nanus uniformis is a species of true weevil in the beetle family Curculionidae. It is found in North America.
