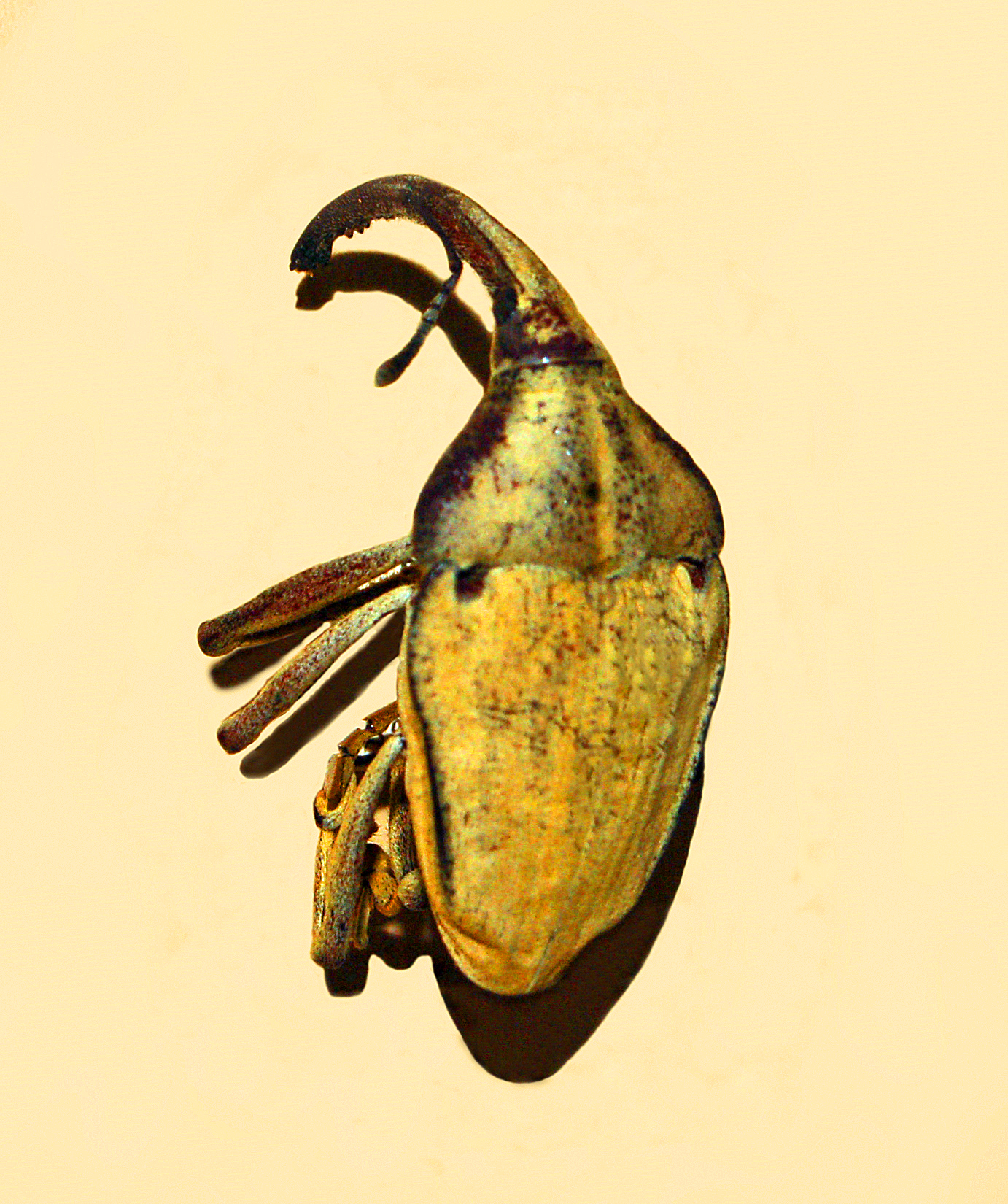
- Rhinastus sternicornis from Brazil

Scientific classification
- Kingdom: Animalia
- Phylum: Arthropoda
- Clade: Pancrustacea
- Class: Insecta
- Order: Coleoptera
- Suborder: Polyphaga
- Infraorder: Cucujiformia
- Superfamily: Curculionoidea
- Family: Curculionidae
- Genus: Rhinastus
- Species: R. sternicornis

Binomial name
- Rhinastus sternicornis (Germar, 1824)

Synonyms
- Rhinastus pertusus Dalman, 1836; Cholus sternicornis Germar, 1824

= Rhinastus sternicornis =

Species of beetle

Rhinastus sternicornis is a species of beetle belonging to the family Curculionidae.

== Description ==
Rhinastus sternicornis can reach a length of 18–37 millimetres (0.71–1.46 in). This large species has very long legs and a strongly arcuate long beak. The pronotum and elytra are quite variable in granulation. The colour varies from pale to deeper tan or yellowish.

The adults of these beetles can be found from January up to March. They have been reported breeding in bamboos. The females puncture the young shoots and lay one egg in each perforation. The larvae develop in the internodes of bamboos and are considered a pest of these plants.

This species shows a striking sexual dimorphism. In fact the male and the female of this beetle were once believed belonging to different species (respectively to Rhinastus pertusus and Rhinastus sternicornis, actually considered synonyms).

== Distribution ==
This species can be found in Brazil, Peru and Argentina.
