= Sthereus quadrituberculatus =

Scientific classification
- Kingdom: Animalia
- Phylum: Arthropoda
- Class: Insecta
- Order: Coleoptera
- Suborder: Polyphaga
- Infraorder: Cucujiformia
- Family: Curculionidae
- Genus: Sthereus
- Species: S. quadrituberculatus

Binomial name
- Sthereus quadrituberculatus Motschulsky, 1845

Species of beetle

Sthereus quadrituberculatus is a species of true weevil in the beetle family Curculionidae. It is found in North America.
