= Caecossonus dentipes =

Scientific classification
- Domain: Eukaryota
- Kingdom: Animalia
- Phylum: Arthropoda
- Class: Insecta
- Order: Coleoptera
- Suborder: Polyphaga
- Infraorder: Cucujiformia
- Family: Curculionidae
- Genus: Caecossonus
- Species: C. dentipes

Binomial name
- Caecossonus dentipes Gilbert, 1955

Species of beetle

Caecossonus dentipes is a species of true weevil in the beetle family Curculionidae are the family of the "true" weevils (or "snout beetles"). They are one of the largest animal families, with 5,489 genera and 82,741[1] species described worldwide. It is found in North America. a molytine tribe endemic to Central America, the Caribbean Islands and some areas of the USA (blind genera are, among others, Caecossonus Gilbert, 1955; Decuanellus Osella, 1977; Pseudoalaocybites Osella, 1980).
