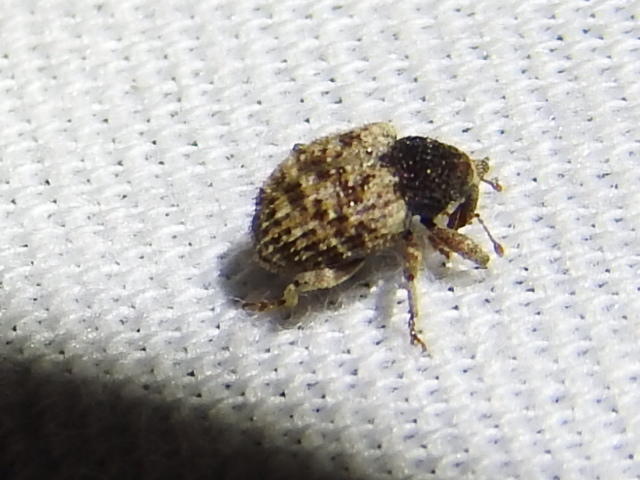
- Pheloconus cribricollis, Texas

Scientific classification
- Domain: Eukaryota
- Kingdom: Animalia
- Phylum: Arthropoda
- Class: Insecta
- Order: Coleoptera
- Suborder: Polyphaga
- Infraorder: Cucujiformia
- Family: Curculionidae
- Genus: Pheloconus
- Species: P. cribricollis

Binomial name
- Pheloconus cribricollis (Say, 1831)

= Pheloconus cribricollis =

Species of beetle

Pheloconus cribricollis is a species of true weevil in the beetle family Curculionidae.
