= Lepyrus nordenskioeldi =

Scientific classification
- Domain: Eukaryota
- Kingdom: Animalia
- Phylum: Arthropoda
- Class: Insecta
- Order: Coleoptera
- Suborder: Polyphaga
- Infraorder: Cucujiformia
- Family: Curculionidae
- Genus: Lepyrus
- Species: L. nordenskioeldi

Binomial name
- Lepyrus nordenskioeldi Faust, 1885

Synonyms
- Lepyrus alternans Casey, 1895; Lepyrus caesius Csiki, 1934; Lepyrus canadensis Casey, 1895

Species of beetle

Lepyrus nordenskioeldi is a species of true weevil in the beetle family Curculionidae.
