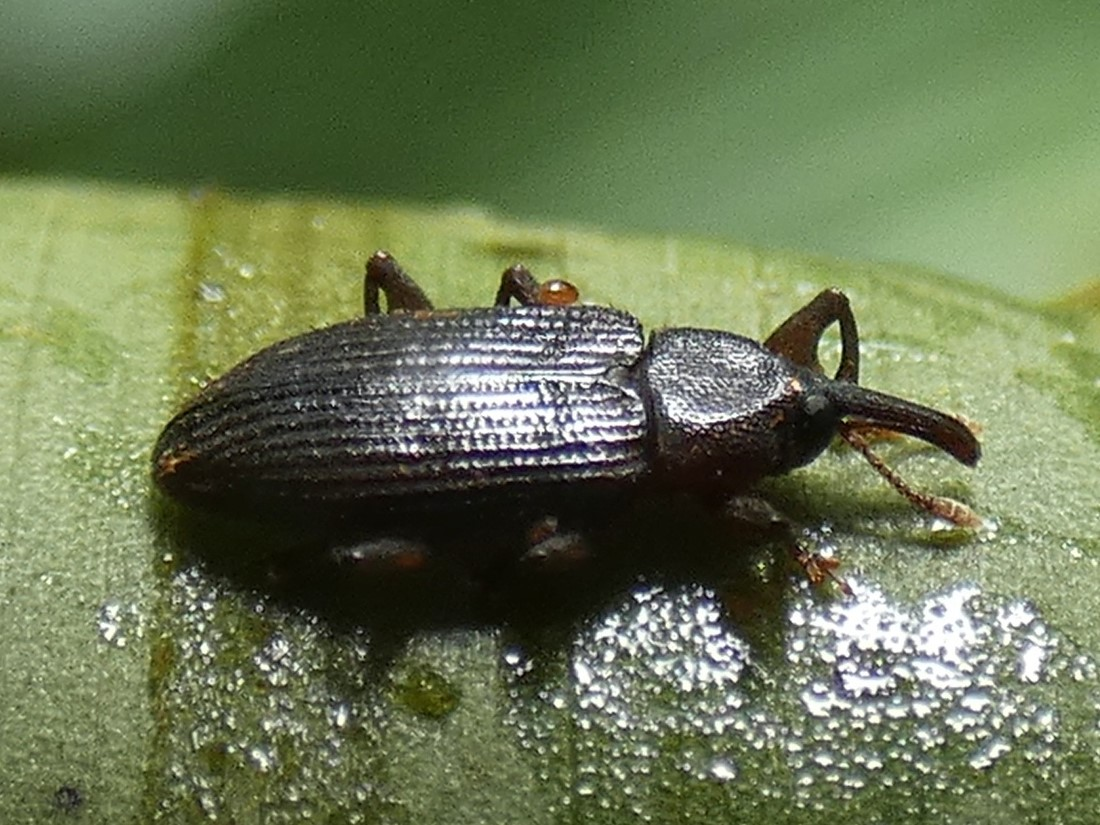
- Nanus hispidus

Scientific classification
- Kingdom: Animalia
- Phylum: Arthropoda
- Clade: Pancrustacea
- Class: Insecta
- Order: Coleoptera
- Suborder: Polyphaga
- Infraorder: Cucujiformia
- Superfamily: Curculionoidea
- Family: Curculionidae
- Subfamily: Molytinae
- Genus: Nanus; Schönherr, 1844

= Nanus (beetle) =

Genus of beetles

Nanus is a genus of true weevils in the family Curculionidae. There are six species recognized in the genus Nanus.

== Species ==
These six species belong to the genus Nanus:

- Nanus dentipes Wollaston, T.V., 1873^{c}
- Nanus erythrurus Hustache, A. in Gruvel, 1932^{c}
- Nanus hispidus Champion, G.C., 1909^{c}
- Nanus punctatellus Boheman, C.H. in Schönherr, C.J., 1844^{c}
- Nanus punctellus Boheman, 1844^{c}
- Nanus uniformis Boheman, 1844^{i c b}

Data sources: i = ITIS, c = Catalogue of Life, g = GBIF, b = Bugguide.net
