= Neoerethistes =

Scientific classification
- Kingdom: Animalia
- Phylum: Arthropoda
- Class: Insecta
- Order: Coleoptera
- Suborder: Polyphaga
- Infraorder: Cucujiformia
- Family: Curculionidae
- Subfamily: Molytinae
- Tribe: Cholini
- Genus: Neoerethistes; O'Brien & Wibmer, 1982

Genus of beetles

Neoerethistes is a genus of true weevils in the beetle family Curculionidae. There are more than 30 described species in Neoerethistes. The only species in North American north of Mexico is Neoerethistes arizonicus, found in the southwestern United States.

The genus Neoerethistes was formerly called Erethistes, which is the name of a genus of South Asian River catfishes.

== Species ==
These 36 species belong to the genus Neoerethistes:

- Neoerethistes arizonicus (Sleeper, 1954)
- Neoerethistes basalis (Chevrolat, 1878)
- Neoerethistes bifasciatus (Chevrolat, 1878)
- Neoerethistes biflexuosus (Chevrolat, 1879)
- Neoerethistes boviei (Desbrochers des Loges, 1908)
- Neoerethistes carbonarius (Chevrolat, 1878)
- Neoerethistes catharinensis (Costa Lima, 1914)
- Neoerethistes colombianus (Guenther, 1943)
- Neoerethistes congestus (Pascoe, 1872)
- Neoerethistes cyanipes (Champion, 1903)
- Neoerethistes desbrochersi (Klima, 1936)
- Neoerethistes duponti (Chevrolat, 1878)
- Neoerethistes fasciatomaculatus ((Chevrolat, 1880))
- Neoerethistes fasciculosus (Champion, 1910)
- Neoerethistes hartmanni (Guenther, 1943)
- Neoerethistes interruptearcuatus (Kuschel, 1955)
- Neoerethistes leucospilus (Pascoe, 1872)
- Neoerethistes licheneus (Pascoe, 1872)
- Neoerethistes lineatocollis (Champion, 1903)
- Neoerethistes luridus (Voss, 1954)
- Neoerethistes montivagus (Guenther, 1943)
- Neoerethistes ochriventris (Pascoe, 1872)
- Neoerethistes rhomboides (Champion, 1906)
- Neoerethistes rubricollis (Guenther, 1943)
- Neoerethistes rufitarsis (Desbr.d.Loges, 1908)
- Neoerethistes sexualis (Chevrolat, 1879)
- Neoerethistes silaceoguttatus (Chevrolat, 1878)
- Neoerethistes subviolaceus (Champion, 1910)
- Neoerethistes tetricus (Chevrolat, 1878)
- Neoerethistes triangularis (Champion, 1903)
- Neoerethistes truncatus (Champion, 1910)
- Neoerethistes uterinus (Chevrolat, 1878)
- Neoerethistes verrucosus (Sturm, 1826)
- Neoerethistes vicinus (Hustache, 1939)
- Neoerethistes waehneri (Guenther, 1943)
- Neoerethistes zygopoides (Champion, 1903)
