= Amalactini =

Scientific classification
- Kingdom: Animalia
- Phylum: Arthropoda
- Clade: Pancrustacea
- Class: Insecta
- Order: Coleoptera
- Suborder: Polyphaga
- Infraorder: Cucujiformia
- Superfamily: Curculionoidea
- Family: Curculionidae
- Subfamily: Molytinae
- Tribe: Amalactini; Lacoridaire, 1863

Synonyms
- Aorini Voss, 1934

Tribe of beetles

Amalactini is a tribe of true weevils in the family Curculionidae.

Three genera are assigned to this tribe:

- Amalactus Schoenherr, 1835
- Aorus Schönherr, 1835
- Paraorus Voss, 1934
