= Caecossonus =

Scientific classification
- Domain: Eukaryota
- Kingdom: Animalia
- Phylum: Arthropoda
- Class: Insecta
- Order: Coleoptera
- Suborder: Polyphaga
- Infraorder: Cucujiformia
- Family: Curculionidae
- Subfamily: Molytinae
- Genus: Caecossonus; Gilbert, 1955

Genus of beetles

Caecossonus is a genus of true weevils in the beetle family Curculionidae. There are at least three described species in Caecossonus.

== Species ==
These three species belong to the genus Caecossonus:

- Caecossonus continuus Howden, 1992
- Caecossonus dentipes Gilbert, 1955
- Caecossonus sylvaticus Howden, 1992
