= Lymantes scrobicollis =

Scientific classification
- Kingdom: Animalia
- Phylum: Arthropoda
- Clade: Pancrustacea
- Class: Insecta
- Order: Coleoptera
- Suborder: Polyphaga
- Infraorder: Cucujiformia
- Superfamily: Curculionoidea
- Family: Curculionidae
- Genus: Lymantes
- Species: L. scrobicollis

Binomial name
- Lymantes scrobicollis Gyllenhal, 1838

Species of beetle

Lymantes scrobicollis is a species of true weevil in the family Curculionidae, found in North America throughout the eastern United States.

L. scrobicollis was described in 1838 by the Swedish entomologist Leonard Gyllenhaal as the founding member of the genus Lymantes, a group of New World weevils with reduced or absent eyes.
