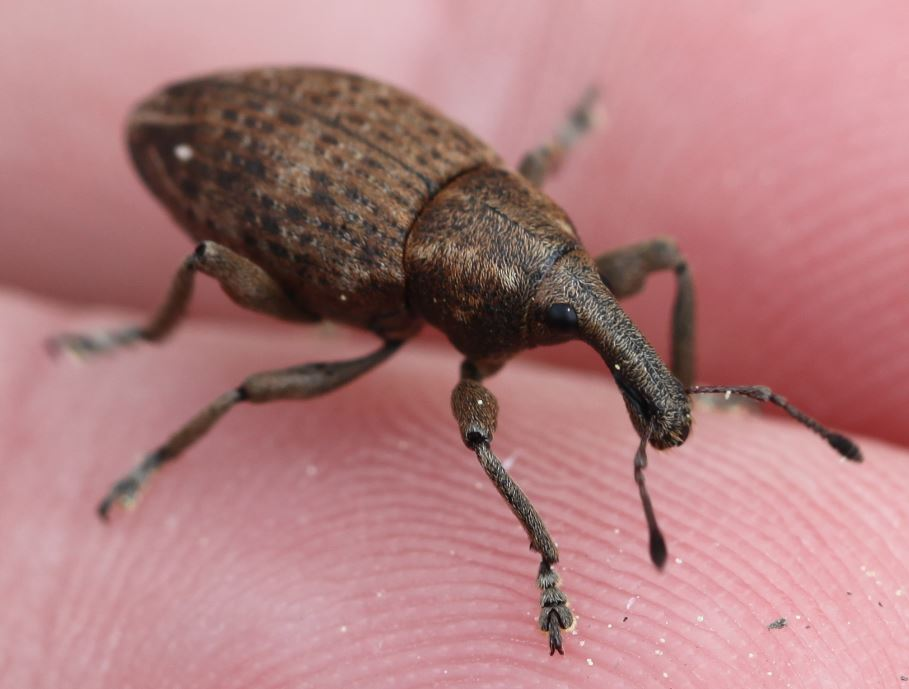

Scientific classification
- Kingdom: Animalia
- Phylum: Arthropoda
- Clade: Pancrustacea
- Class: Insecta
- Order: Coleoptera
- Suborder: Polyphaga
- Infraorder: Cucujiformia
- Family: Curculionidae
- Genus: Lepyrus
- Species: L. capucinus

Binomial name
- Lepyrus capucinus (Schaller, 1783)

= Lepyrus capucinus =

Species of beetle

Lepyrus capucinus is a species of beetle belonging to the family Curculionidae.

It is native to Europe.
