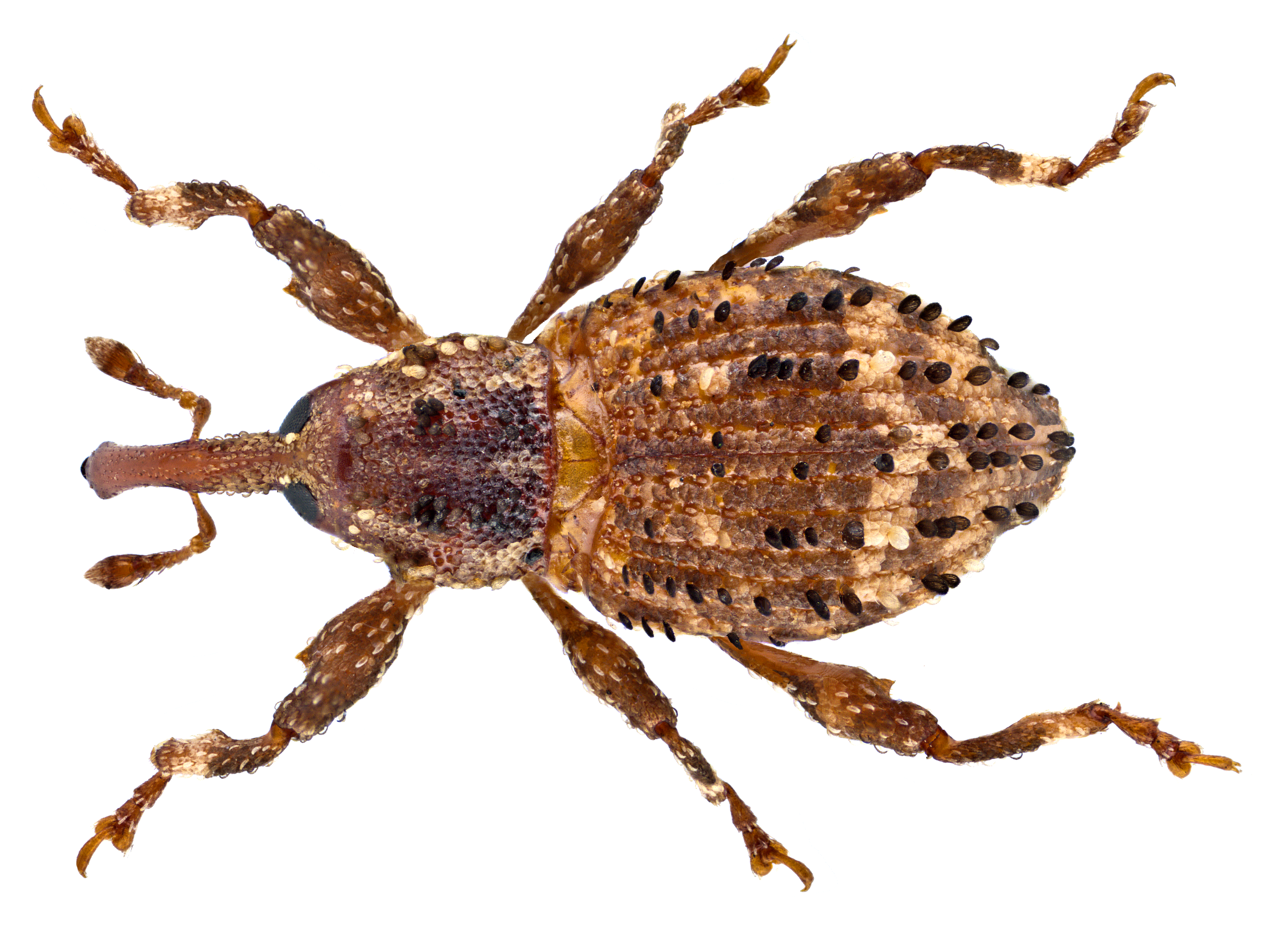

Scientific classification
- Kingdom: Animalia
- Phylum: Arthropoda
- Class: Insecta
- Order: Coleoptera
- Suborder: Polyphaga
- Infraorder: Cucujiformia
- Family: Curculionidae
- Genus: Trachodes
- Species: T. hispidus

Binomial name
- Trachodes hispidus (Linnaeus, 1758)

= Trachodes hispidus =

Species of beetle

Trachodes hispidus is a species of true weevil in the beetle family Curculionidae. It is found in North America and Europe.
