= Mecysolobini =

- Merus obfuscatus

Scientific classification
- Kingdom: Animalia
- Phylum: Arthropoda
- Clade: Pancrustacea
- Class: Insecta
- Order: Coleoptera
- Suborder: Polyphaga
- Infraorder: Cucujiformia
- Superfamily: Curculionoidea
- Family: Curculionidae
- Subfamily: Molytinae
- Tribe: Mecysolobini; Reitter, 1913

Tribe of beetles

The Mecysolobini are a tribe of weevil genera in the subfamily Molytinae, erected by Edmund Reitter in 1913. He described a type genus called Mecysolobus Reitter, 1905, which is now considered a synonym of Merus Gistel, 1857.

== Genera ==
As of October 2026, BioLib includes:

1. Alcidodes G.A.K. Marshall, 1939
2. Alcidodoplesius Voss, 1960
3. Brahmalcidodes Pajni & Dhir, 1987
4. Cylindralcides Heller, 1918
5. Merus Gistel, 1857
6. Neomecyslobus Pajni & Dhir, 1987
7. Ornatalcides Heller, 1917
8. Sternuchopsis Heller, 1918
9. Tuberculomecyslobus Pajni & Dhir, 1987
