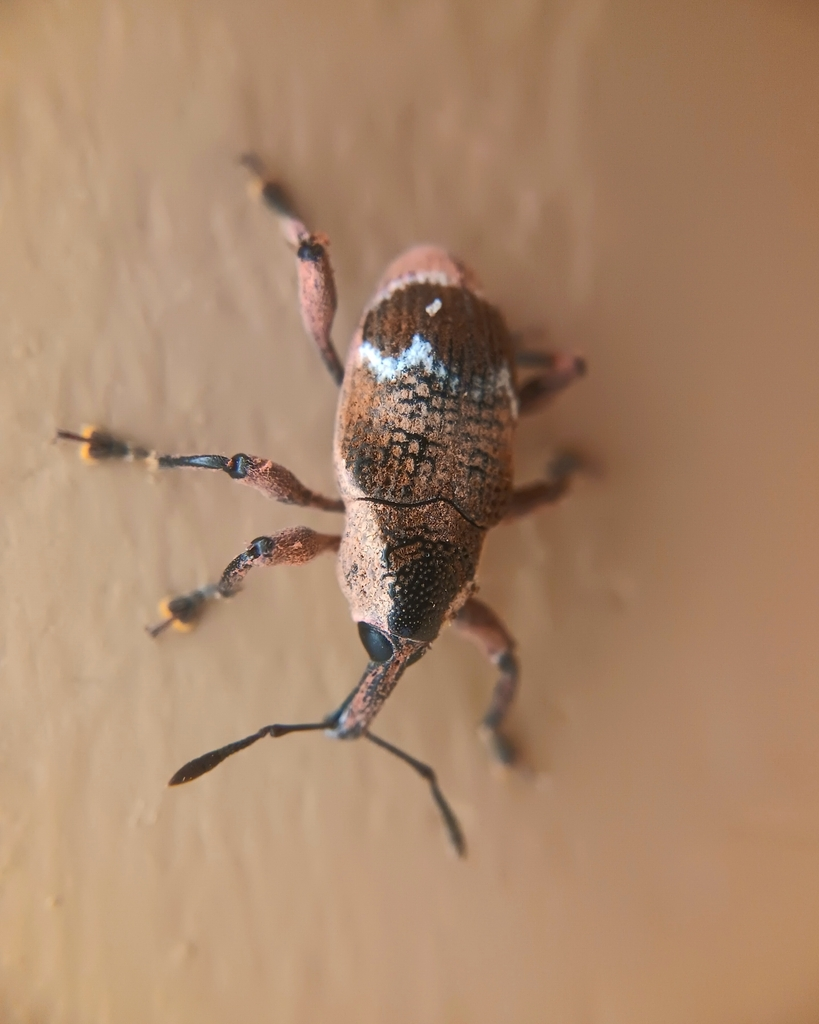

Scientific classification
- Kingdom: Animalia
- Phylum: Arthropoda
- Class: Insecta
- Order: Coleoptera
- Suborder: Polyphaga
- Infraorder: Cucujiformia
- Family: Curculionidae
- Genus: Aclees
- Species: A. hirayamai

Binomial name
- Aclees hirayamai Kôno, 1933

= Aclees hirayamai =

Species of beetle

Aclees hirayamai is a weevil in the genus Aclees from Taiwan and Japan.

== Appearance ==
This species looks like a bigger classic weevil. It has a brown overall color, but has a white "double v" pattern and a dark pattern going downward from the head in an almost spotlight shadow shape, with a lighter middle.
