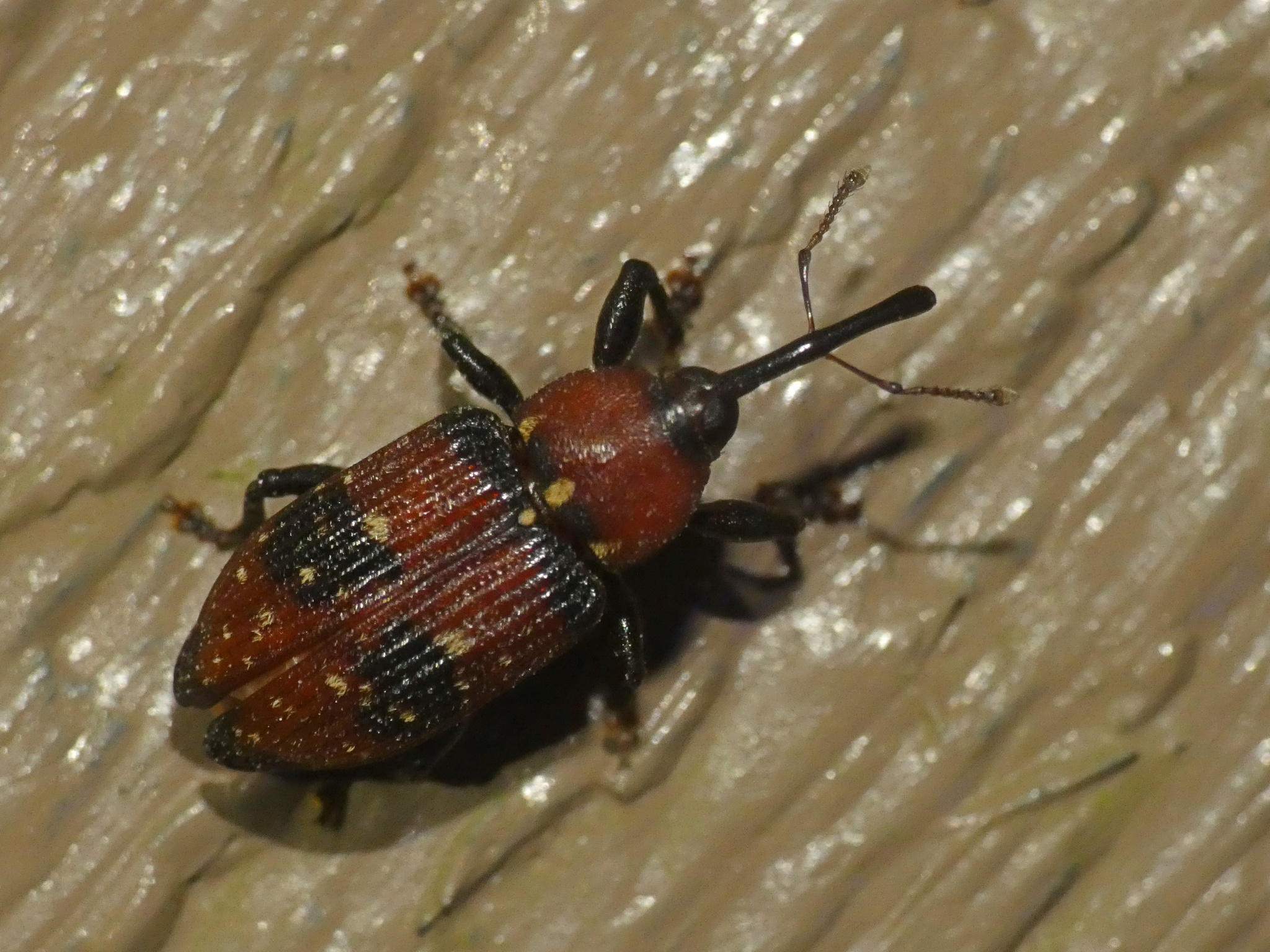
- Tranes tinctipennis

Scientific classification
- Kingdom: Animalia
- Phylum: Arthropoda
- Clade: Pancrustacea
- Class: Insecta
- Order: Coleoptera
- Suborder: Polyphaga
- Infraorder: Cucujiformia
- Superfamily: Curculionoidea
- Family: Curculionidae
- Subfamily: Molytinae
- Genus: Tranes; Schönherr, 1843

= Tranes =

Genus of beetles

Tranes is a genus of true weevils in the beetle family Curculionidae. There are about 11 described species in the genus Tranes.

== Species ==
These 11 species belong to the genus Tranes:

- Tranes insignipes Lea, 1929
- Tranes insularis Pascoe & F.P., 1874
- Tranes internatus Pascoe, 1870 (macrozamia borer)
- Tranes lyterioides Pascoe & F.P., 1875
- Tranes monopticus Pascoe & F.P., 1870
- Tranes prosternalis Lea, 1929
- Tranes roei Pascoe & F.P., 1929
- Tranes sparsus Boheman, 1843
- Tranes subopacus Lea, 1929
- Tranes vigorsii Boheman, 1843
- Tranes xanthorrhoeae Lea & A.M., 1898
