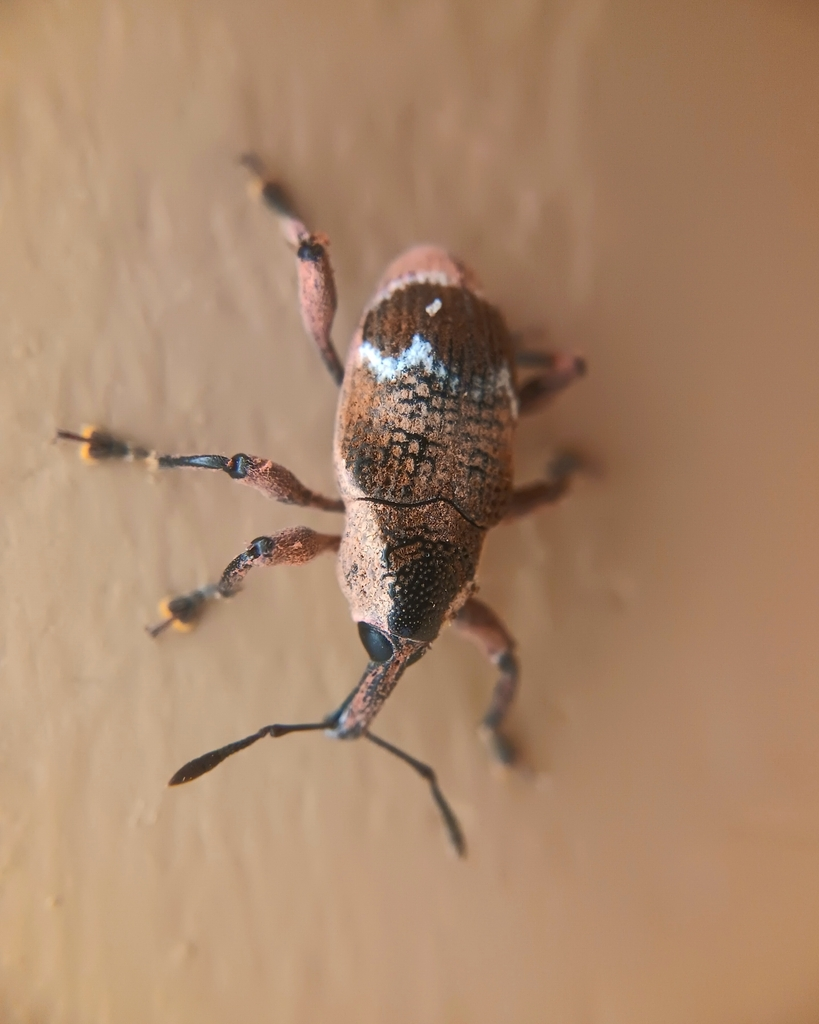
- Aclees hirayamai

Scientific classification
- Kingdom: Animalia
- Phylum: Arthropoda
- Class: Insecta
- Order: Coleoptera
- Suborder: Polyphaga
- Infraorder: Cucujiformia
- Family: Curculionidae
- Subfamily: Molytinae
- Genus: Aclees; C.J.Schoenherr, 1835

Species
- see text

= Aclees =

Genus of weevil

Aclees is genus of fig weevil. Aclees taiwanensis has become an invasive species in many countries in Southern Europe, found in France in 1997 and again in Italy in 2005, where it threatens orchards and wild plants.

== Species ==
A total of 32 or 33 species are currently recognized in the genus:

- Aclees africanus Faust, 1895
- Aclees bidentulus Desbrochers, 1891
- Aclees bifasciatus Desbrochers, 1891
- Aclees birmanus Faust, 1895
- Aclees bispinulus Desbrochers, 1891
- Aclees brunneus (Fabricius, 1781)
- Aclees conicollis Desbrochers, 1891
- Aclees crassirostris Marshall, 1926
- Aclees cribratus Gyllenhal, 1835
- Aclees davidi Dalla Torre & Schenkling, 1932
- Aclees fatuus Faust, 1895
- Aclees foveatus Voss, 1932
- Aclees granulosus Faust, 1899
- Aclees gyllenhali Pascoe, 1871
- Aclees hirayamai Kôno, 1933
- Aclees horsfieldi Lacordaire, 1863
- Aclees hovanus Fairmaire, 1898
- Aclees hylobioides Desbrochers, 1891
- Aclees impressifrons Hustache, A., 1920
- Aclees indignus Marshall, 1915
- Aclees jekeli Heller
- Aclees juvencus Faust, 1892
- Aclees lacordairei Desbrochers, 1891
- Aclees pacca Boheman, 1843
- Aclees parallelus Hustache, 1932
- Aclees porosus Pascoe, 1871
- Aclees pseudocribratus Osella, 1989
- Aclees roelofsi Desbrochers, 1891
- Aclees saipanensis Kôno, 1942
- Aclees senegalensis Fairmaire, 1891
- Aclees taiwanensis Kôno
- Aclees upembaense Voss, 1962

== Origin ==
The genus was first named in France 1997 however instances of the weevil were first seen in Taiwan in 1933.
