= Tranes internatus =

Scientific classification
- Domain: Eukaryota
- Kingdom: Animalia
- Phylum: Arthropoda
- Class: Insecta
- Order: Coleoptera
- Suborder: Polyphaga
- Infraorder: Cucujiformia
- Family: Curculionidae
- Genus: Tranes
- Species: T. internatus

Binomial name
- Tranes internatus Pascoe, 1870

Species of beetle

Tranes internatus, the macrozamia borer, is a species of true weevil in the beetle family Curculionidae. It is found in North America.
