= Pheloconus =

Scientific classification
- Domain: Eukaryota
- Kingdom: Animalia
- Phylum: Arthropoda
- Class: Insecta
- Order: Coleoptera
- Suborder: Polyphaga
- Infraorder: Cucujiformia
- Family: Curculionidae
- Subfamily: Molytinae
- Tribe: Conotrachelini
- Genus: Pheloconus

Genus of beetles

Pheloconus is a genus of beetles in the family Curculionidae. There are at least three described species in Pheloconus.

== Species ==
- Pheloconus cribricollis (Say, 1831)
- Pheloconus hispidus (LeConte, 1876)
- Pheloconus infector (Boheman, 1845)
