= Sternechus paludatus =

Scientific classification
- Kingdom: Animalia
- Phylum: Arthropoda
- Class: Insecta
- Order: Coleoptera
- Suborder: Polyphaga
- Infraorder: Cucujiformia
- Family: Curculionidae
- Genus: Sternechus
- Species: S. paludatus

Binomial name
- Sternechus paludatus (Casey, 1895)

Species of beetle

Sternechus paludatus, the bean stalk weevil, is a species of true weevil in the beetle family Curculionidae. It is found in North America.
