= Micralcinus stehri =

Scientific classification
- Domain: Eukaryota
- Kingdom: Animalia
- Phylum: Arthropoda
- Class: Insecta
- Order: Coleoptera
- Suborder: Polyphaga
- Infraorder: Cucujiformia
- Family: Curculionidae
- Genus: Micralcinus
- Species: M. stehri

Binomial name
- Micralcinus stehri Sleeper, 1955

Species of beetle

Micralcinus stehri is a species of true weevil in the beetle family Curculionidae. It is found in North America.
