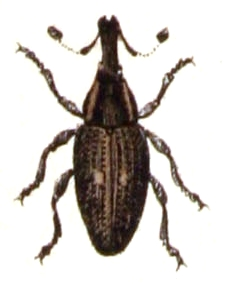
- Lepyrus palustris

Scientific classification
- Kingdom: Animalia
- Phylum: Arthropoda
- Class: Insecta
- Order: Coleoptera
- Suborder: Polyphaga
- Infraorder: Cucujiformia
- Family: Curculionidae
- Subfamily: Molytinae
- Genus: Lepyrus; Germar, 1817

= Lepyrus =

Genus of beetles

Lepyrus is a genus of true weevils in the beetle family Curculionidae. There are more than 70 described species in Lepyrus.

== Species ==
These 71 species belong to the genus Lepyrus:

- Lepyrus alternans Casey, 1895
- Lepyrus arctoalpinus Korotyaev, 1998
- Lepyrus armatus Weise, 1893
- Lepyrus asperatus Schaufuss, 1882
- Lepyrus bermani Korotyaev, 2008
- Lepyrus bimaculatus Dejean, 1821
- Lepyrus binotatus Schoenherr, 1834
- Lepyrus bituberculatus Cristofori & Jan, 1832
- Lepyrus brevis Schneider, 1900
- Lepyrus caesius Csiki, 1934
- Lepyrus canadensis Casey, 1895
- Lepyrus canus Gyllenhal, 1834
- Lepyrus capucinus (Schaller, 1783)
- Lepyrus caucasicus Korotyaev, 1995
- Lepyrus chinganensis Zumpt, 1936
- Lepyrus christophi Faust, 1882
- Lepyrus christophori Kleine, 1918
- Lepyrus cinereus Weise, 1893
- Lepyrus colon Germar, 1817
- Lepyrus costulatus Faust, 1882
- Lepyrus dahlii Cristofori & Jan, 1832
- Lepyrus dorsalis Reitter, 1890
- Lepyrus elongatus Zumpt, 1936
- Lepyrus errans Casey, 1895
- Lepyrus evictus Scudder
- Lepyrus flavidulus Reitter, 1908
- Lepyrus frigidus Lomnicki, 1894
- Lepyrus gamma Megerle
- Lepyrus ganglbaueri Faust, 1888
- Lepyrus gemellus Kirby, 1837
- Lepyrus geminatus Say, 1831
- Lepyrus germinatus Say, 1831
- Lepyrus gibber Faust, 1882
- Lepyrus griseus Melichar, 1912
- Lepyrus herbichi Reitter, 1896
- Lepyrus impudicus Cristofori & Jan, 1832
- Lepyrus japonicus Roelofs, 1873
- Lepyrus kabaki Korotyaev, 1995
- Lepyrus konoi Zumpt, 1936
- Lepyrus kozlovi Korotyaev, 1995
- Lepyrus labradorensis Blair, 1933
- Lepyrus merkli Korotyaev, 1995
- Lepyrus motschulskyi Faust, 1882
- Lepyrus nebulosus Motschulsky, 1860
- Lepyrus nordenskioeldi Faust, 1885
- Lepyrus nordenskioldi Faust, 1885
- Lepyrus notabilis Faust, 1882
- Lepyrus oregonus Casey, 1895
- Lepyrus palustris (Scopoli, 1763)
- Lepyrus perforatus Casey, 1895
- Lepyrus pinguis Casey, 1895
- Lepyrus quadriguttatus Sturm, 1826
- Lepyrus quadrinotatus Boheman, 1842
- Lepyrus quadrituberculatus Cristofori & Jan, 1832
- Lepyrus rufoclavatus Sturm, 1826
- Lepyrus rugicollis Desbrochers, 1895
- Lepyrus semicolon Billberg, 1820
- Lepyrus sibiricus Zumpt, 1938
- Lepyrus signatipennis Roelofs & W., 1873
- Lepyrus sokolovi Korotyaev, 1998
- Lepyrus staudingeri Zumpt, 1936
- Lepyrus stefanssoni (Leng, 1919)
- Lepyrus terrestris Motschulsky, 1860
- Lepyrus tesselatus Van Dyke, 1928
- Lepyrus tessellatus Van Dyke, 1928
- Lepyrus triguttatus Germar, 1817
- Lepyrus tsherenkovi Korotyaev, 1995
- Lepyrus variegatus Schmidt, 1856
- Lepyrus ventricosus Faust, 1882
- Lepyrus v-griseum Megerle,
- Lepyrus volgensis Faust, 1882
