= Lepyrus gemellus =

Scientific classification
- Kingdom: Animalia
- Phylum: Arthropoda
- Clade: Pancrustacea
- Class: Insecta
- Order: Coleoptera
- Suborder: Polyphaga
- Infraorder: Cucujiformia
- Superfamily: Curculionoidea
- Family: Curculionidae
- Genus: Lepyrus
- Species: L. gemellus

Binomial name
- Lepyrus gemellus Kirby, 1837

Synonyms
- Lepyrus errans Casey, 1895

Species of beetle

Lepyrus gemellus is a species of true weevil in the beetle family Curculionidae. It is found in North America.
