= Sternechus armatus =

Scientific classification
- Kingdom: Animalia
- Phylum: Arthropoda
- Class: Insecta
- Order: Coleoptera
- Suborder: Polyphaga
- Infraorder: Cucujiformia
- Family: Curculionidae
- Genus: Sternechus
- Species: S. armatus

Binomial name
- Sternechus armatus (Casey, 1895)

Species of beetle

Sternechus armatus is a species of true weevil in the family of beetles known as Curculionidae. It is found in North America.
