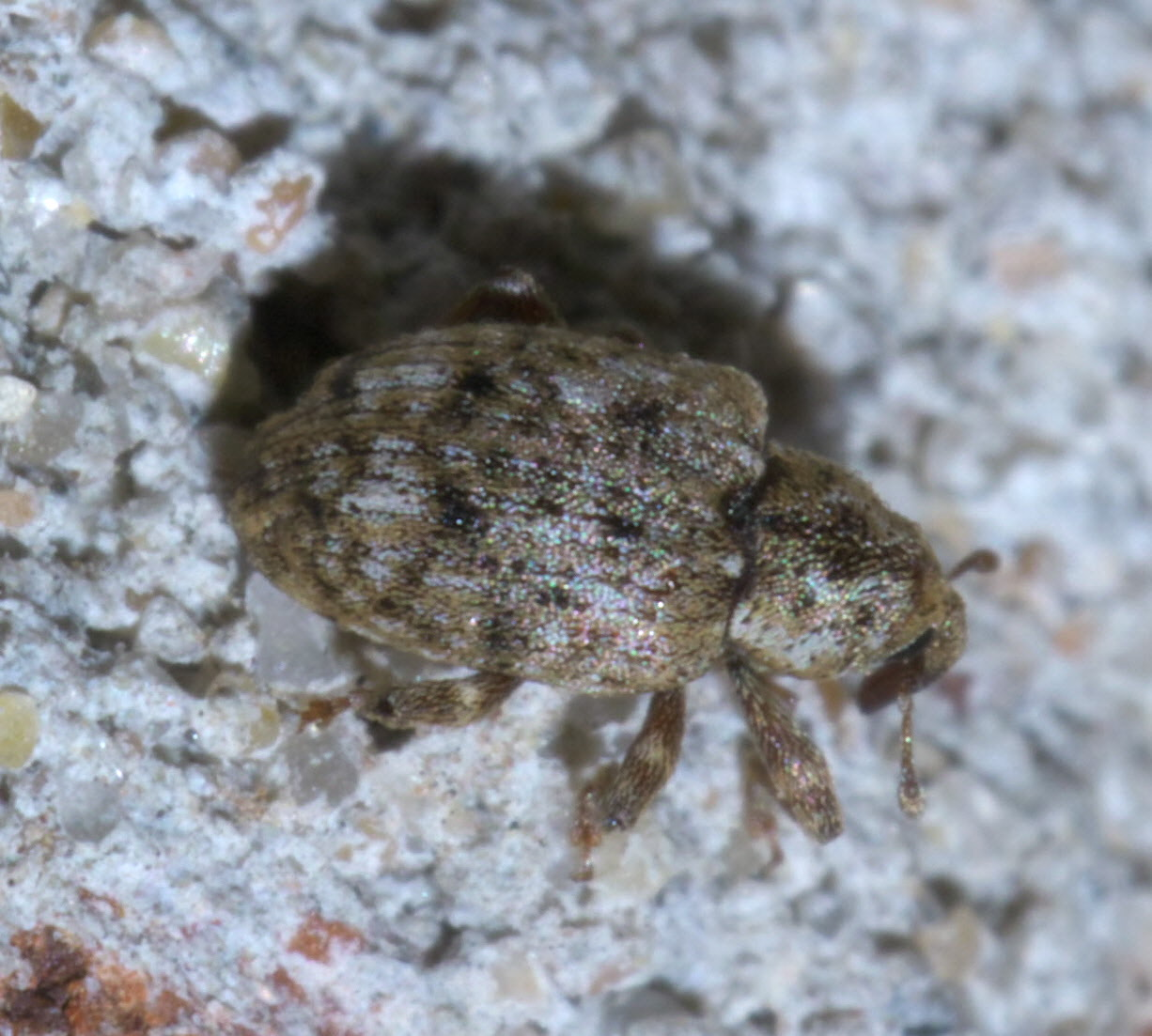
- Conotrachelus recessus

Scientific classification
- Domain: Eukaryota
- Kingdom: Animalia
- Phylum: Arthropoda
- Class: Insecta
- Order: Coleoptera
- Suborder: Polyphaga
- Infraorder: Cucujiformia
- Family: Curculionidae
- Subfamily: Molytinae
- Tribe: Conotrachelini

= Conotrachelini =

Tribe of beetles

Conotrachelini is a tribe of true weevils in the family of beetles known as Curculionidae. There are about 7 genera and at least 50 described species in Conotrachelini.

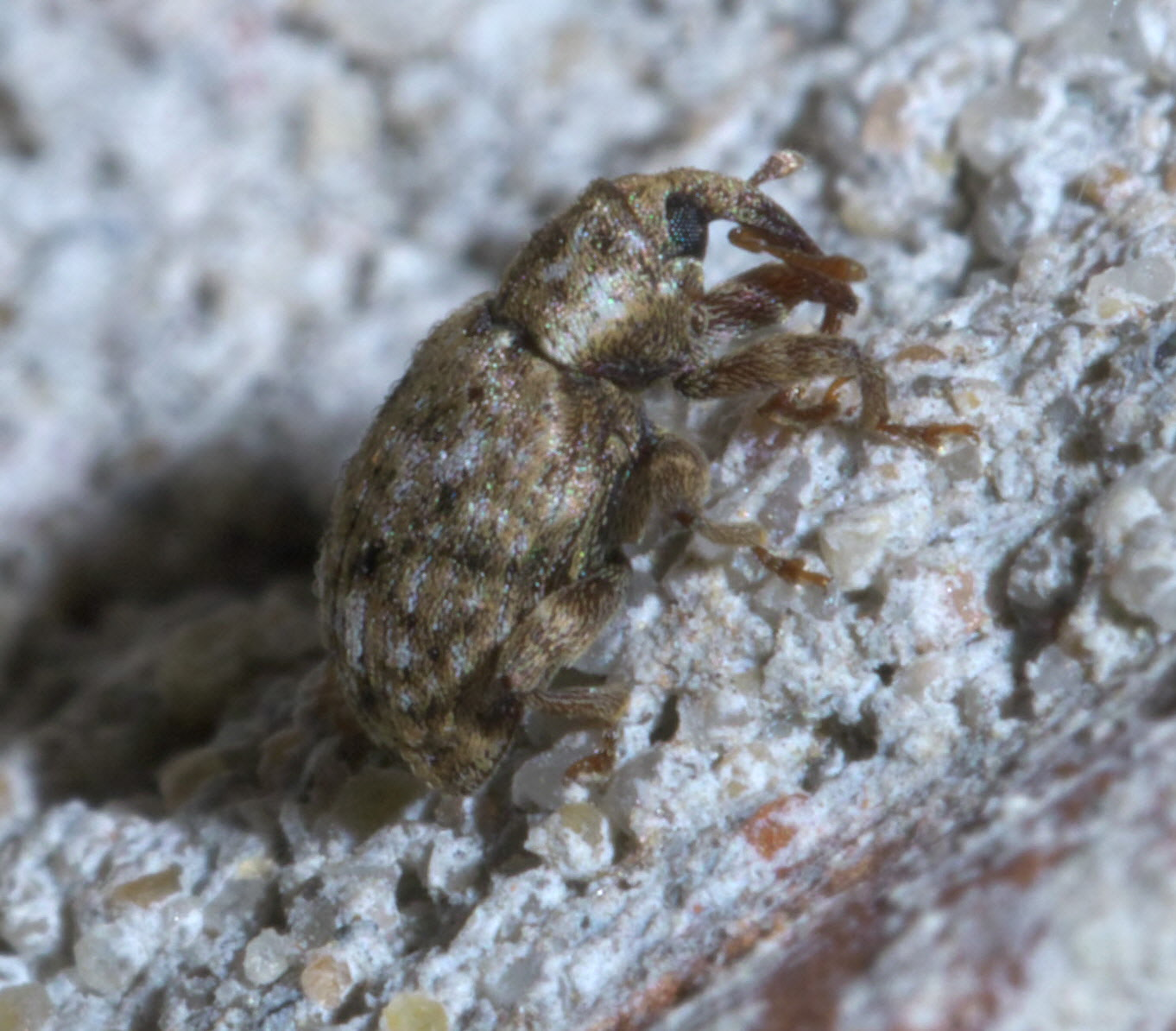
Conotrachelus recessus

== Genera ==
These seven genera belong to the tribe Conotrachelini:

- Conotrachelus Dejean, 1835^{i c g b}
- Epacalles Kissinger, 1964^{i c g b}
- Lepilius Champion, 1905^{c g b}
- Micralcinus LeConte, 1876^{i c g b}
- Microhyus LeConte, 1876^{i c g b}
- Micromastus LeConte, 1876^{i c g b}
- Pheloconus Roelofs, 1875^{i c g b}

Data sources: i = ITIS, c = Catalogue of Life, g = GBIF, b = Bugguide.net
