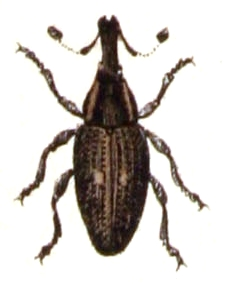

Scientific classification
- Kingdom: Animalia
- Phylum: Arthropoda
- Clade: Pancrustacea
- Class: Insecta
- Order: Coleoptera
- Suborder: Polyphaga
- Infraorder: Cucujiformia
- Family: Curculionidae
- Genus: Lepyrus
- Species: L. palustris

Binomial name
- Lepyrus palustris (Scopoli, 1763)

Synonyms
- Curculio colon Linnaeus, 1771; Lepyrus geminatus Say, 1831; Lepyrus pinguis Casey, 1895

= Lepyrus palustris =

Species of beetle

Lepyrus palustris is a species of true weevil in the beetle family Curculionidae. It is found in North America and Europe.
