= Lepyrus oregonus =

Scientific classification
- Kingdom: Animalia
- Phylum: Arthropoda
- Class: Insecta
- Order: Coleoptera
- Suborder: Polyphaga
- Infraorder: Cucujiformia
- Family: Curculionidae
- Genus: Lepyrus
- Species: L. oregonus

Binomial name
- Lepyrus oregonus Casey, 1895

Synonyms
- Lepyrus perforatus Casey, 1895; Lepyrus tesselatus Van Dyke, 1928

Species of beetle

Lepyrus oregonus is a species of true weevil in the beetle family Curculionidae. It is found in North America.

== Subspecies ==
These two subspecies belong to the species Lepyrus oregonus:

- Lepyrus oregonus oregonus Casey, 1895
- Lepyrus oregonus tessellatus Van Dyke, 1928
