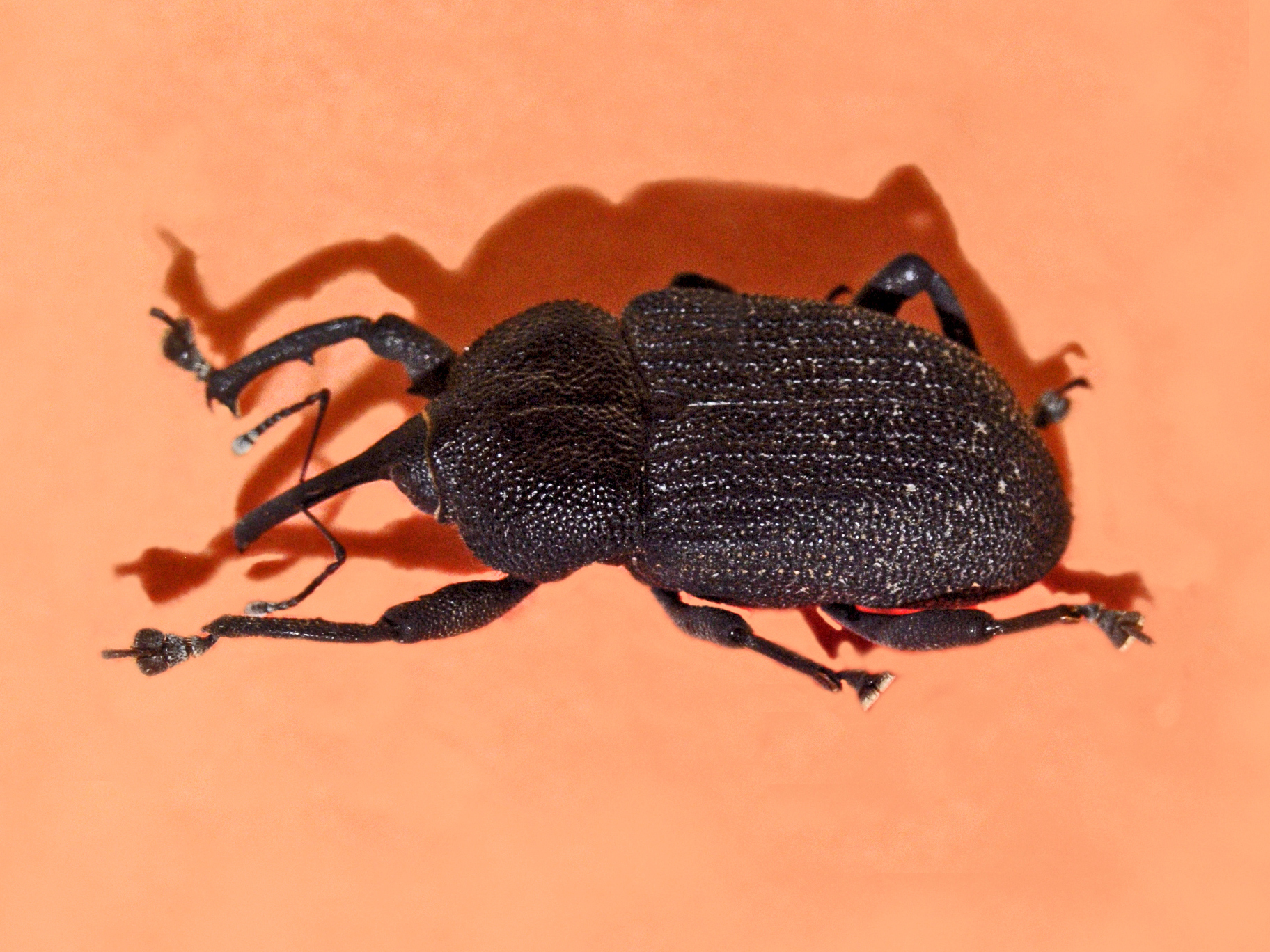
- Museum specimen of Homalinotus colossus

Scientific classification
- Kingdom: Animalia
- Phylum: Arthropoda
- Class: Insecta
- Order: Coleoptera
- Suborder: Polyphaga
- Infraorder: Cucujiformia
- Family: Curculionidae
- Genus: Homalinotus
- Species: H. colossus

Binomial name
- Homalinotus colossus Fåhraeus, 1844

= Homalinotus colossus =

Species of beetle

Homalinotus colossus is a species of weevil belonging to the family Curculionidae. This species can be found in Brazil.
