= Sternechus =

Scientific classification
- Domain: Eukaryota
- Kingdom: Animalia
- Phylum: Arthropoda
- Class: Insecta
- Order: Coleoptera
- Suborder: Polyphaga
- Infraorder: Cucujiformia
- Family: Curculionidae
- Subfamily: Molytinae
- Genus: Sternechus; Schönherr, 1826

Genus of beetles

Sternechus is a genus of true weevils in the beetle family Curculionidae. There are more than 50 described species in Sternechus.

== Species ==
These 54 species belong to the genus Sternechus:

- Sternechus armatus (Casey, 1895)
- Sternechus aurocinctus Champion & G.C., 1902
- Sternechus bicaudatus Champion & G.C., 1902
- Sternechus bicinctus Champion & G.C., 1902
- Sternechus bifasciatus Champion & G.C., 1902
- Sternechus brevicollis Champion & G.C., 1902
- Sternechus breyeri Brèthes, 1910
- Sternechus caliginosus Boheman, 1843
- Sternechus candidus Guérin-Méneville, 1844
- Sternechus contiguus Hustache, 1939
- Sternechus continuus Champion & G.C., 1902
- Sternechus costatus Blanchard & E., 1837-44
- Sternechus decemmaculatus Guérin-Méneville, 1844
- Sternechus denticollis Hustache, 1939
- Sternechus denudatus Boheman, 1843
- Sternechus egenus Boheman, 1843
- Sternechus exellens Heyne, A.-Taschenberg & O., 1908
- Sternechus extortus Chevrolat, 1833
- Sternechus fasciatus Mendes, 1962
- Sternechus firmus Boheman, 1843
- Sternechus foveolatus Champion & G.C., 1902
- Sternechus fuscoaeneus Boheman, 1843
- Sternechus fuscomaculatus Champion & G.C., 1902
- Sternechus gonopterus Mendes, 1957
- Sternechus granulosus Rosado Neto, 1977
- Sternechus guerini Boheman, 1843
- Sternechus guerinoides Mendes, 1962
- Sternechus guttatus Mendes, 1957
- Sternechus hamatus Boheman, 1835
- Sternechus inconditus Boheman, 1843
- Sternechus insularis Boheman, 1843
- Sternechus irroratus Boheman, 1843
- Sternechus laevirostris Hustache, 1939
- Sternechus mesosternalis Mendes, 1962
- Sternechus mrazi Voss, 1934
- Sternechus nitidus Champion & G.C., 1902
- Sternechus paludatus (Casey, 1895) (bean stalk weevil)
- Sternechus pectoralis Suffrian & E., 1872
- Sternechus pinguis (Fabricius & J.C., 1787)
- Sternechus pollinosus Marshall, 1952
- Sternechus reticulatus Champion & G.C., 1902
- Sternechus russatoides Mendes, 1962
- Sternechus russatus Boheman, 1835
- Sternechus sahlbergi Schoenherr, 1843
- Sternechus spinipes Champion & G.C., 1902
- Sternechus sublaevicollis Hustache, 1939
- Sternechus subsignatus Boheman, 1835
- Sternechus trachyptomus Schoenherr, 1826
- Sternechus triangulifer Rosado Neto, 1977
- Sternechus tuberculatus Boheman, 1835
- Sternechus tuberosus Boheman, 1843
- Sternechus uncipennis Schoenherr, 1835
- Sternechus vicinus Fleutiaux, Sallé & A., 1889
- Sternechus vulgaris Mendes, 1962
