= Micralcinus cribratus =

Scientific classification
- Kingdom: Animalia
- Phylum: Arthropoda
- Class: Insecta
- Order: Coleoptera
- Suborder: Polyphaga
- Infraorder: Cucujiformia
- Family: Curculionidae
- Genus: Micralcinus
- Species: M. cribratus

Binomial name
- Micralcinus cribratus LeConte, 1876

Species of beetle

Micralcinus cribratus is a species of true weevil in the beetle family Curculionidae. It is found in North America.
