= Emphyastes fucicola =

Scientific classification
- Domain: Eukaryota
- Kingdom: Animalia
- Phylum: Arthropoda
- Class: Insecta
- Order: Coleoptera
- Suborder: Polyphaga
- Infraorder: Cucujiformia
- Family: Curculionidae
- Genus: Emphyastes
- Species: E. fucicola

Binomial name
- Emphyastes fucicola Mannerheim, 1852

Species of beetle

Emphyastes fucicola is a species of true weevil in the beetle family Curculionidae. It is found in North America.
