= Sthereus horridus =

Scientific classification
- Domain: Eukaryota
- Kingdom: Animalia
- Phylum: Arthropoda
- Class: Insecta
- Order: Coleoptera
- Suborder: Polyphaga
- Infraorder: Cucujiformia
- Family: Curculionidae
- Genus: Sthereus
- Species: S. horridus

Binomial name
- Sthereus horridus (Mannerheim, 1852)

Species of beetle

Sthereus horridus is a species of true weevil in the beetle family Curculionidae.
