= Pheloconus infector =

Scientific classification
- Kingdom: Animalia
- Phylum: Arthropoda
- Class: Insecta
- Order: Coleoptera
- Suborder: Polyphaga
- Infraorder: Cucujiformia
- Family: Curculionidae
- Genus: Pheloconus
- Species: P. infector

Binomial name
- Pheloconus infector (Boheman, 1845)

Species of beetle

Pheloconus infector is a species of true weevil in the beetle family Curculionidae.
