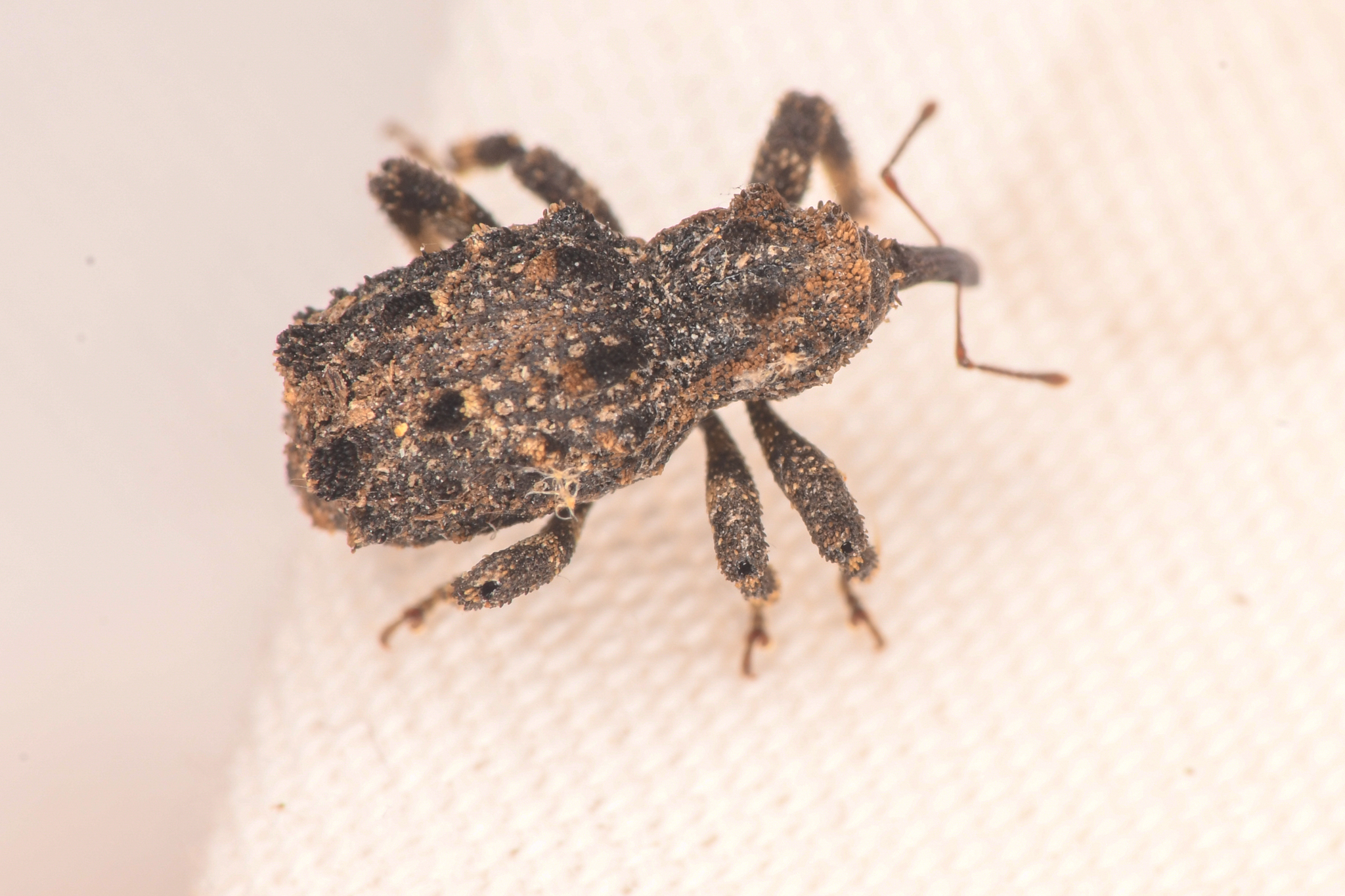
- Sthereus horridus, California

Scientific classification
- Kingdom: Animalia
- Phylum: Arthropoda
- Clade: Pancrustacea
- Class: Insecta
- Order: Coleoptera
- Suborder: Polyphaga
- Infraorder: Cucujiformia
- Superfamily: Curculionoidea
- Family: Curculionidae
- Subfamily: Molytinae
- Tribe: Molytini
- Genus: Sthereus

= Sthereus =

Genus of beetles

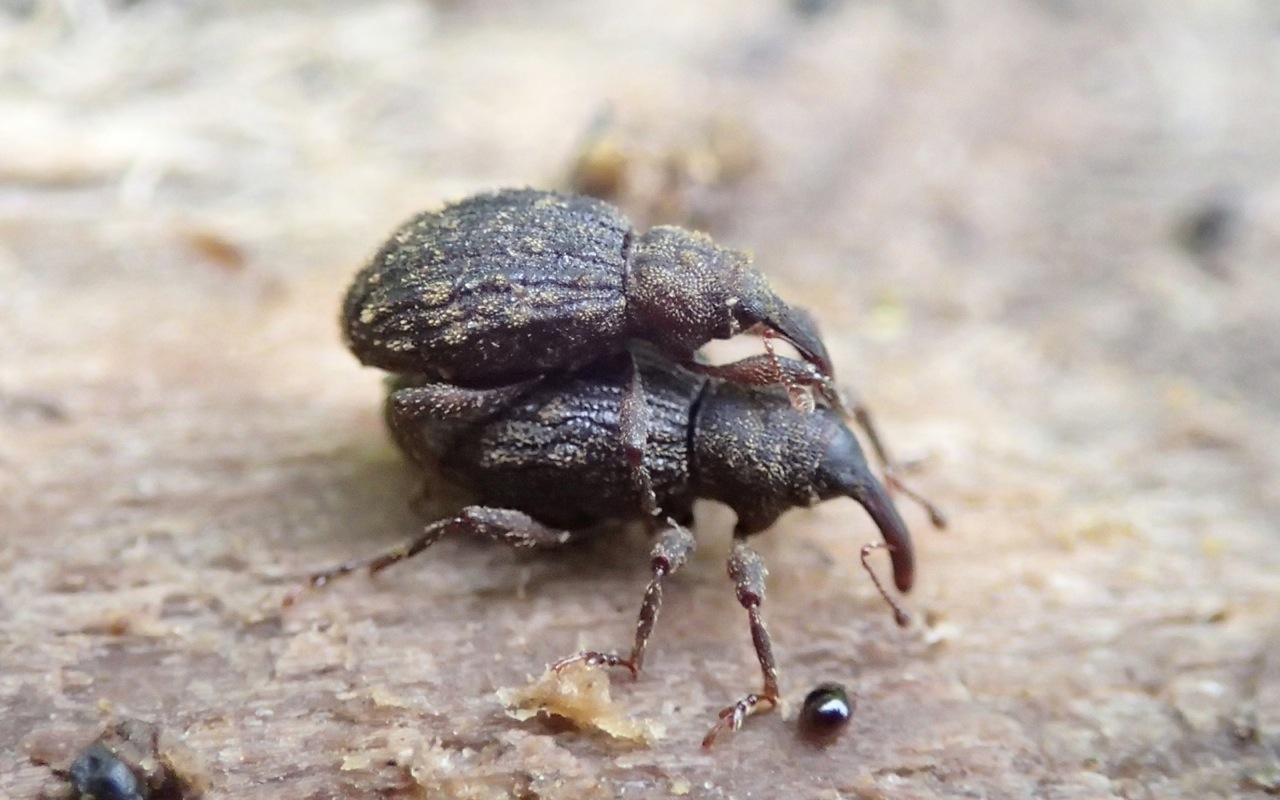

Sthereus is a genus of true weevils in the beetle family Curculionidae. There are about seven described species in Sthereus, found along the Pacific coast from northern California to the Aleutian Islands.

== Species ==
These seven species belong to the genus Sthereus:

- Sthereus borealis Motschulsky, 1845
- Sthereus fasciculatus Motschulsky, 1845
- Sthereus horridus (Mannerheim, 1852)
- Sthereus multituberculatus Buchanan, 1936
- Sthereus ptinoides (Germar, 1824)
- Sthereus quadrituberculatns Motschulsky, V. de, 1845
- Sthereus quadrituberculatus Motschulsky, 1845
