= Gononotus =

Scientific classification
- Kingdom: Animalia
- Phylum: Arthropoda
- Class: Insecta
- Order: Coleoptera
- Suborder: Polyphaga
- Infraorder: Cucujiformia
- Family: Curculionidae
- Subfamily: Molytinae
- Genus: Gononotus; LeConte, 1876

Genus of beetles

Gononotus is a genus of true weevils in the beetle family Curculionidae. There are at least two described species in Gononotus.

== Species ==
These two species belong to the genus Gononotus:

- Gononotus angulicollis (Suffrian, 1871)
- Gononotus lutosus LeConte & J.L., 1876
