= Micromastus =

Scientific classification
- Kingdom: Animalia
- Phylum: Arthropoda
- Class: Insecta
- Order: Coleoptera
- Suborder: Polyphaga
- Infraorder: Cucujiformia
- Family: Curculionidae
- Tribe: Conotrachelini
- Genus: Micromastus; LeConte, 1876

Genus of beetles

Micromastus is a genus of true weevils in the beetle family Curculionidae. There is one described species in Micromastus, M. gracilis.
