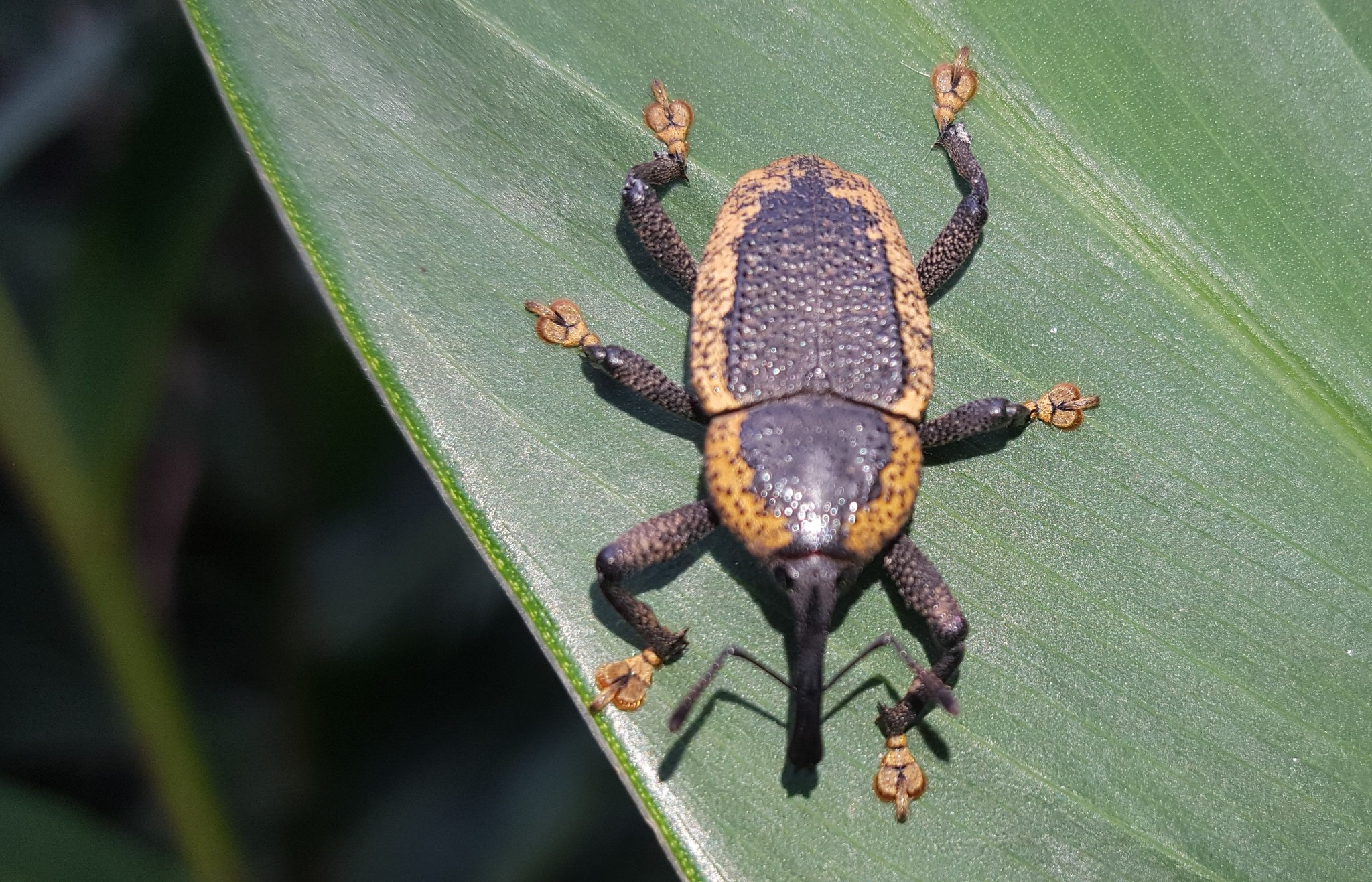
- Homalinotus deplanatus

Scientific classification
- Kingdom: Animalia
- Phylum: Arthropoda
- Clade: Pancrustacea
- Class: Insecta
- Order: Coleoptera
- Suborder: Polyphaga
- Infraorder: Cucujiformia
- Superfamily: Curculionoidea
- Family: Curculionidae
- Subfamily: Molytinae
- Tribe: Cholini

= Cholini =

Tribe of beetles

Cholini is a tribe of true weevils in the family Curculionidae, mostly found in the Americas.

== Genera ==
As of October 2026, Biolib includes the following genera:

subtribe Cholina Schönherr, 1825

1. Adionychus Heller, 1906
2. Ameris Dejean, 1821
3. Cholus Germar, 1824
4. Homalinotus Schönherr in Sahlberg, 1823
5. Homalomorphus Hustache, 1956
6. Lobaspis Chevrolat, 1881
7. Odontocholus Desbrochers, 1906

subtribe Cholomina Vaurie, 1974

1. Cholomus Roelofs, 1880
2. Irenarchus (beetle) Pascoe, 1881

subtribe Rhinastina Vaurie, 1973

1. Acrotomopus Chevrolat, 1879
2. Allostegotes Hustache, 1949
3. Anaenomus Pascoe, 1872
4. Astyage Pascoe, 1872
5. Brachycnemis Schönherr, 1844
6. Cryptaspis Pascoe, 1872
7. Desmosomus Perty, 1832
8. Ectomastes Desbrochers, 1906
9. Kangoropus Chevrolat, 1878
10. Lixodes Pascoe, 1882
11. Neodesmosomus Desbrochers, 1906
12. Neoerethistes O'Brien & Wibmer, 1982
13. Nertocholus Heller, 1906
14. Peliobia Pascoe, 1872
15. Perideraeus Schönherr, 1844
16. Rhinastus Schönherr, 1825
17. Rhyssomatus Schönherr, 1837
18. Sclerosomus Schoenherr, 1836
19. Thoracus Chevrolat, 1878
20. Tormeuphorus Faust, 1893
