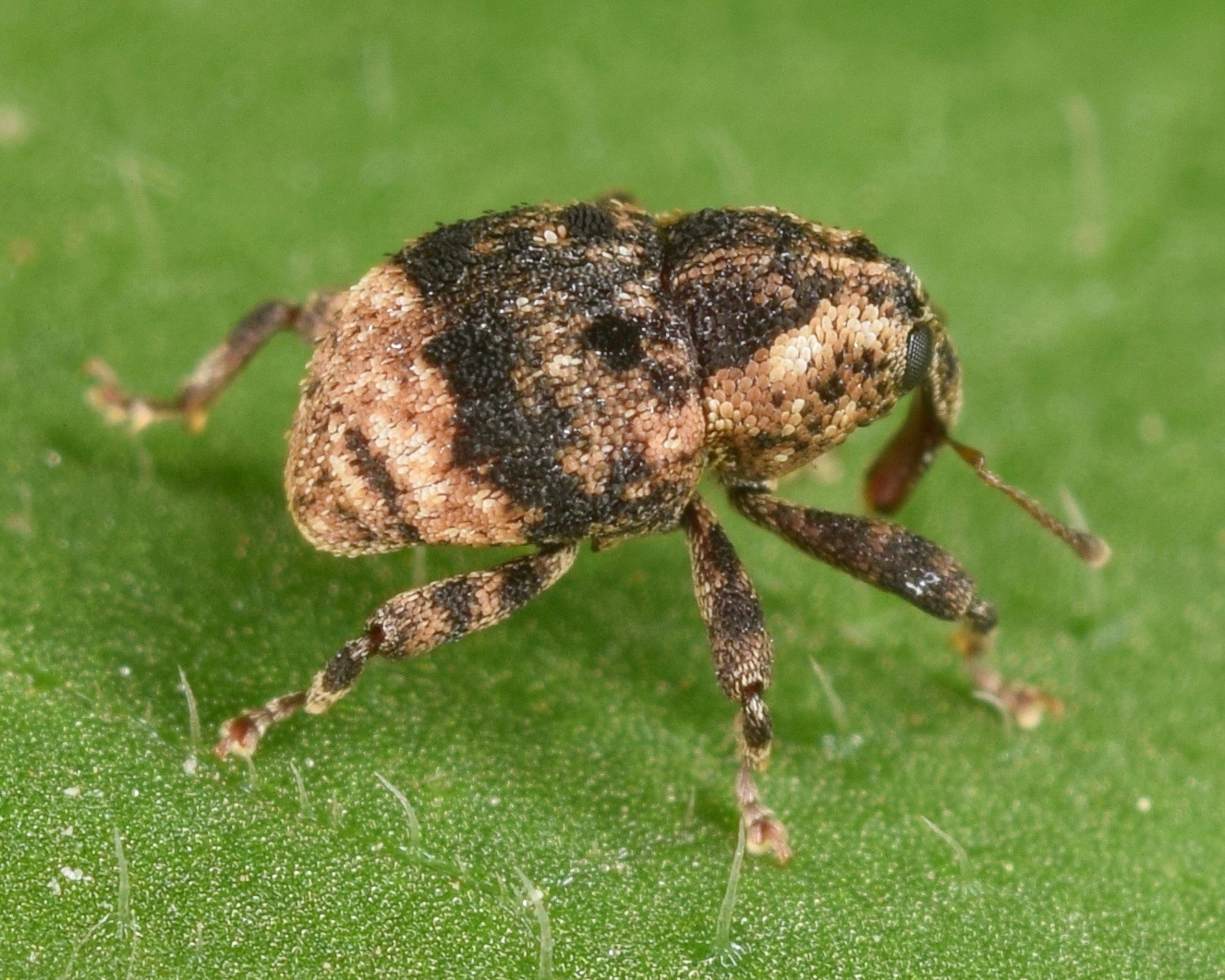
- Epacalles inflatus

Scientific classification
- Domain: Eukaryota
- Kingdom: Animalia
- Phylum: Arthropoda
- Class: Insecta
- Order: Coleoptera
- Suborder: Polyphaga
- Infraorder: Cucujiformia
- Family: Curculionidae
- Tribe: Conotrachelini
- Genus: Epacalles; Kissinger, 1964

= Epacalles =

Genus of beetles

Epacalles is a genus of true weevils in the beetle family Curculionidae. There is one described species in Epacalles, E. inflatus.
