= Coconut production in Brazil =

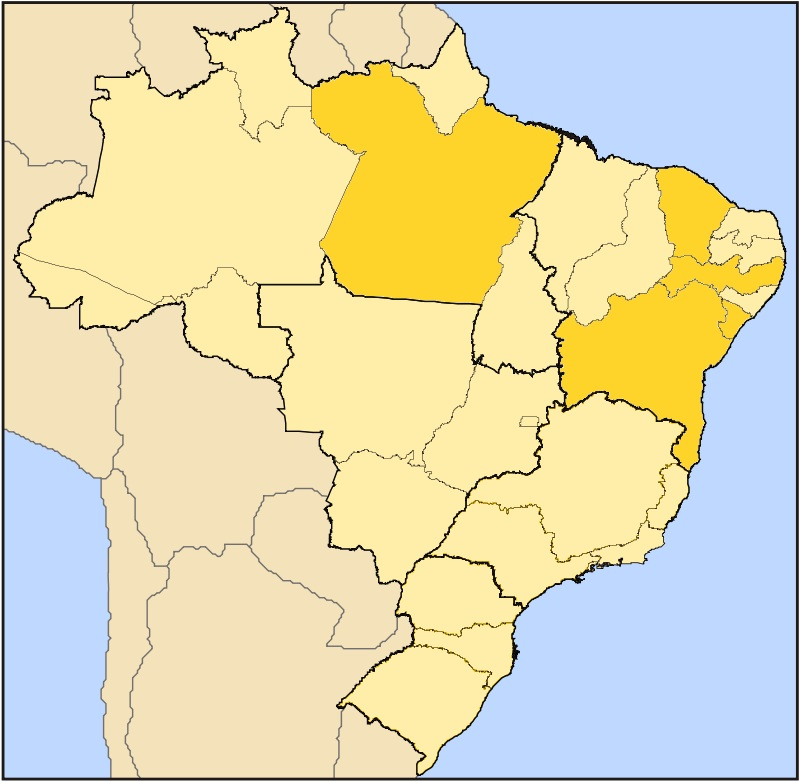
Main coconut producing states in Brazil

Coconut production contributes to the national economy of Brazil. According to figures published in December 2009 by the Food and Agriculture Organization of the United Nations, it is the world's fourth-largest producer of coconuts, producing 2,759,044 tonnes in 2009.
