= Microhyus =

Scientific classification
- Kingdom: Animalia
- Phylum: Arthropoda
- Class: Insecta
- Order: Coleoptera
- Suborder: Polyphaga
- Infraorder: Cucujiformia
- Family: Curculionidae
- Tribe: Conotrachelini
- Genus: Microhyus; LeConte, 1876

Genus of beetles

Microhyus is a genus of true weevils in the beetle family Curculionidae. There is at least one described species in Microhyus, M. setiger.
