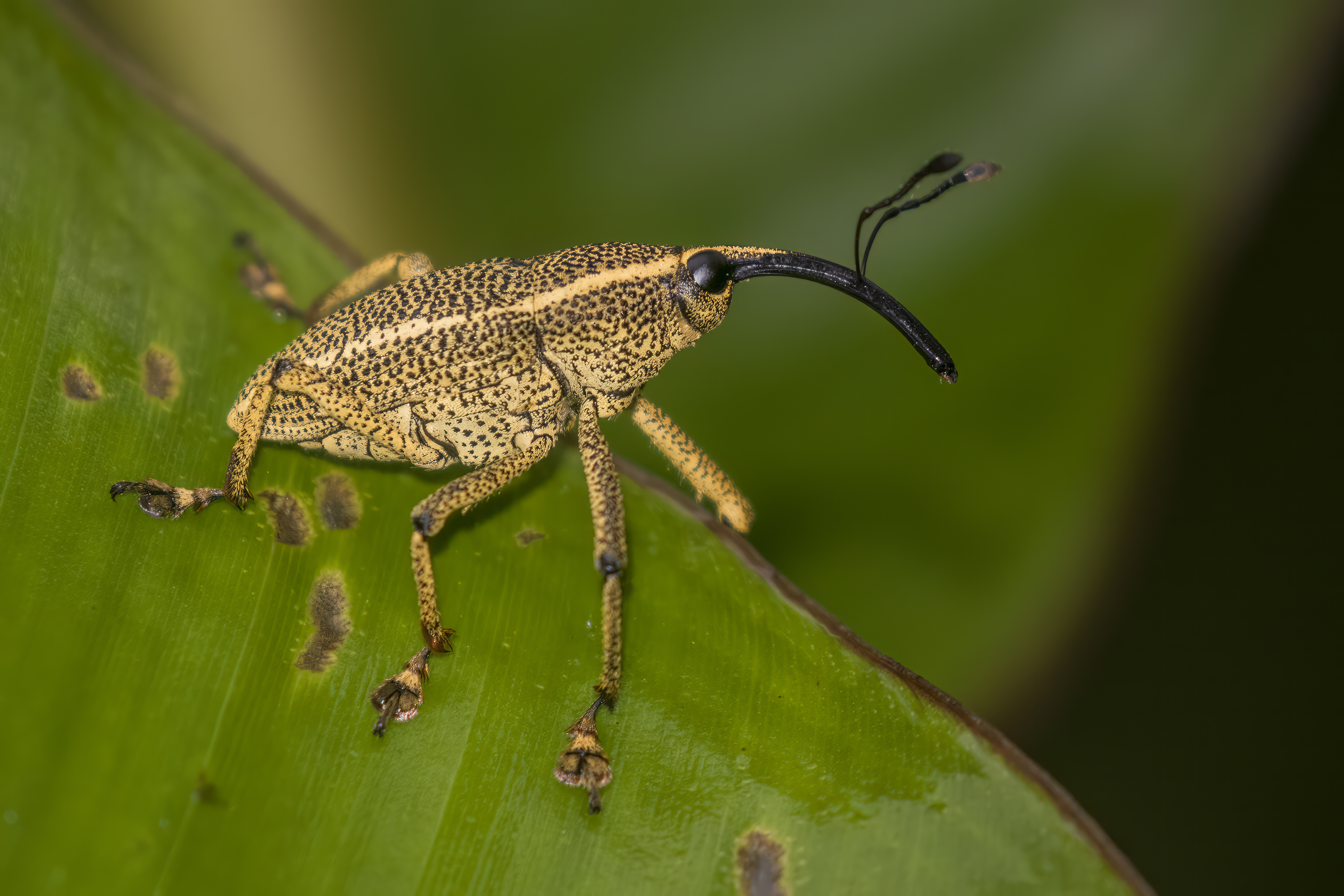
- Cholus cinctus in Panama.
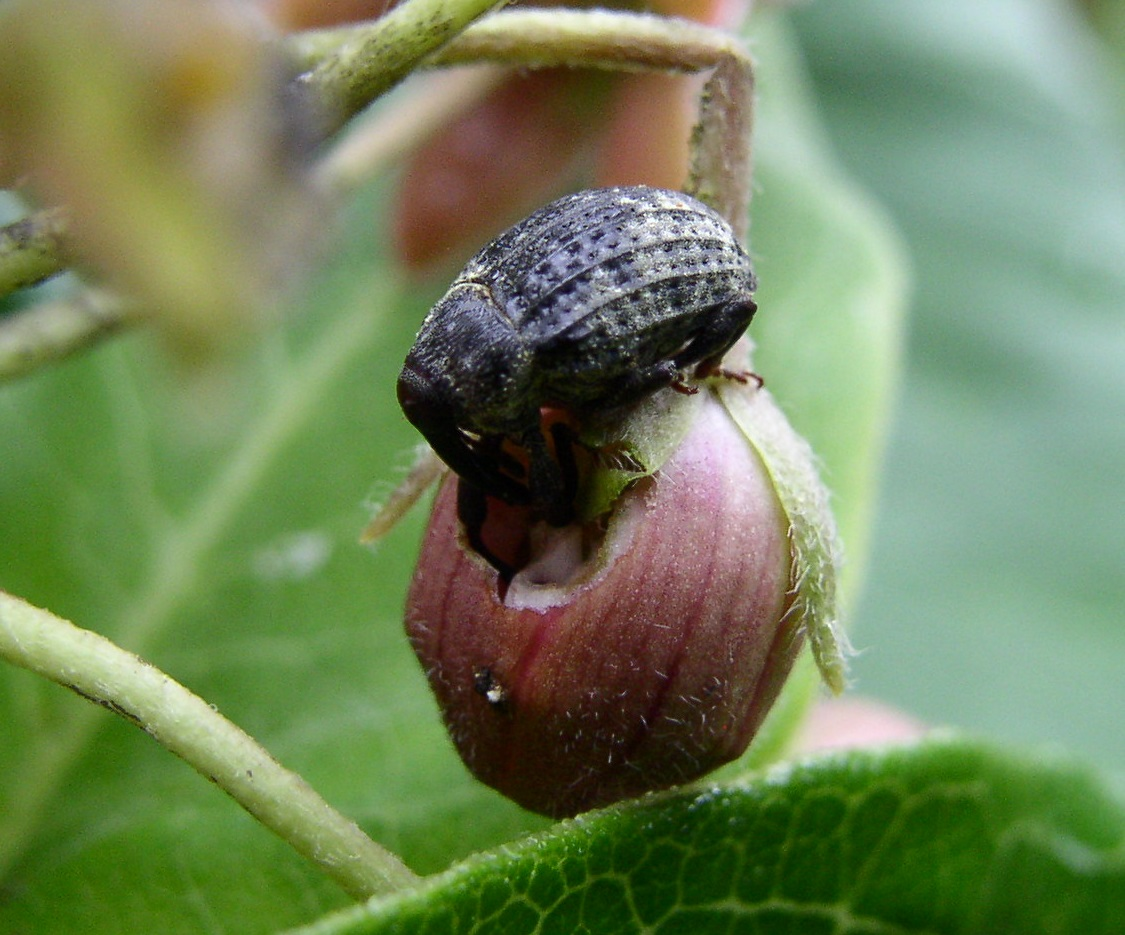
- Rhyssomatus lineaticollis on a milkweed bud

Scientific classification
- Kingdom: Animalia
- Phylum: Arthropoda
- Clade: Pancrustacea
- Class: Insecta
- Order: Coleoptera
- Suborder: Polyphaga
- Infraorder: Cucujiformia
- Superfamily: Curculionoidea
- Family: Curculionidae
- Subfamily: Molytinae; Schönherr, 1823

Tribes
- Many, see text

= Molytinae =

Subfamily of beetles

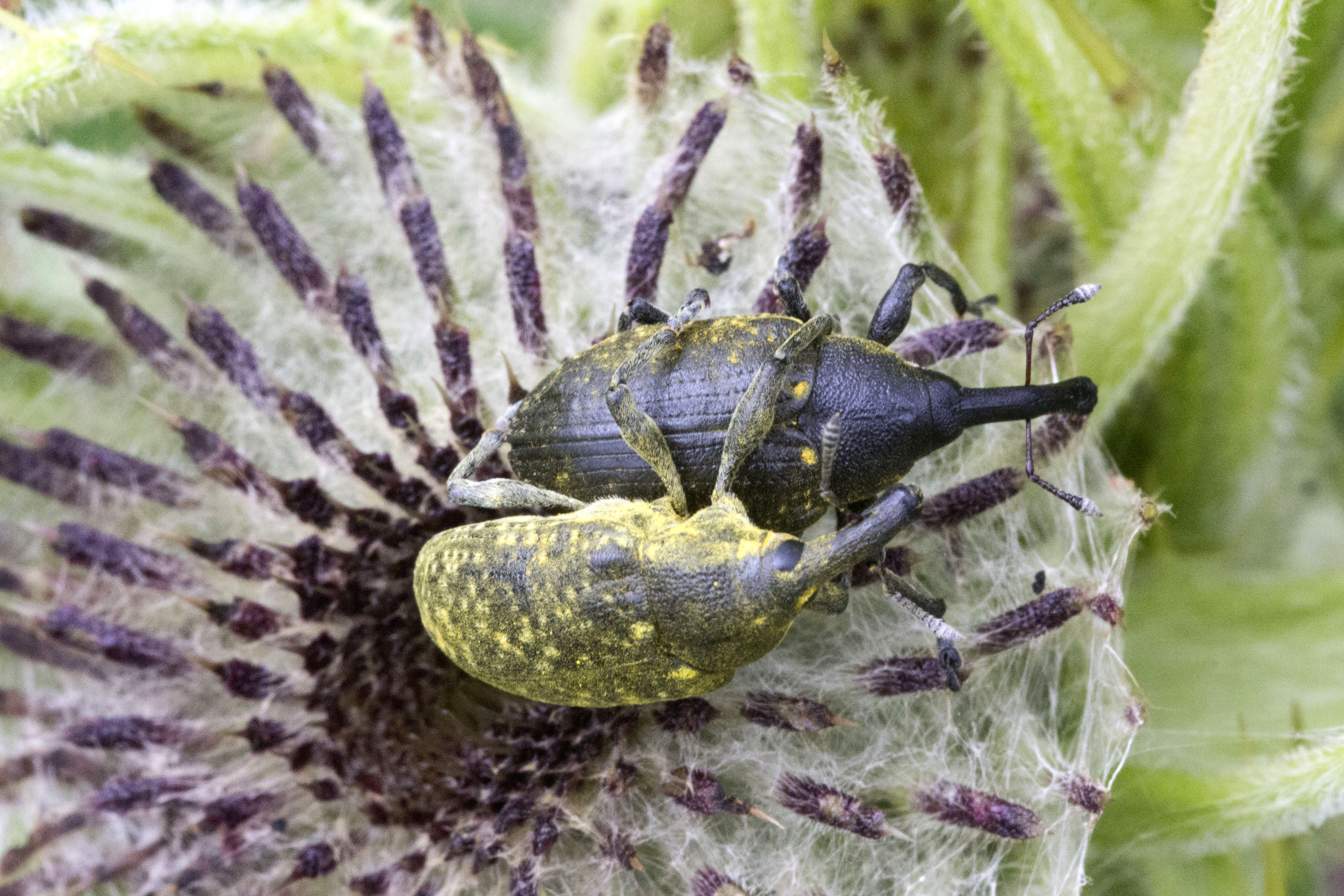
Liparus - MHNT

Molytinae is a subfamily of weevils that belongs to the family Curculionidae (true weevils). Members of this subfamily have been found in a wide range including the Americas, Chile, New Zealand, Southeastern Asia, etc. This subfamily has a wide variety of host plants including but not limited to dicots, monocots, in particularly palms and gymnosperms such conifers and cycads. Their larvae will feed on the stems, fruits, seeds and other tissues of host plant.

The larvae of many Molytin species often pose a serious threat as pests to agricultural and forestry industries with larvae feeding on much of the plants.

== Taxonomy ==
The subfamily was described in 1823 by Carl Johan Schönherr, a Swedish entomologist.

Molytinae is a very diverse subfamily being the second largest group within the family Curculionidae. Due to its size and the poorly studied nature of some groups, the identification and classification of its species has faced many challenges. Despite the number of species already described, there is likely a large number of cryptic species currently undiscovered. The accurate identification and classification of Molytin species is important in dealing with them as pests in agriculture and forestry.

=== Tribes ===
In many older treatments, the Bagoinae, Cryptorhynchinae, Hyperinae, Lixinae and Mesoptiliinae are included within Molytinae as "tribus groups", as well as the Itini which are otherwise considered a tribe of the Curculioninae. Below is a list of tribes that are currently considered to be within this subfamily:

- Amalactini
- Aminyopini
- Amorphocerini
- Anchonini
- Cholini
- Cleogonini
- Conotrachelini
- Cycloterini
- Dinomorphini
- Euderini
- Galloisiini
- Guioperini
- Hylobiini
- Ithyporini
- Juanorhinini
- Lepyrini
- Lithinini
- Lymantini
- Mecysolobini
- Metatygini
- Molytini
- Nettarhinini
- Pacholenini
- Paipalesomini
- Petalochilini
- Phoenicobatini
- Phrynixini
- Pissodini
- Sternechini
- Styanacini
- Thalasselephantini
- Trachodini
- Trigonocolini
- Trypetidini

=== Genera ===
Below is a partial list of genera that belong to the subfamily Molytinae:

- Aclees
- Adexius
- Alloplinthus
- Anchonidium
- Anchonus
- Anisorhynchus
- Aparopion
- Baezia
- Caecossonus
- Chalcodermus
- Cholus
- Conotrachelus
- Demyrsus
- Dioptrophorus
- Echinosomidia
- Emphyastes
- Epacalles
- Eudociminus
- Gastrotaphrus
- Gononotus
- Heilipus
- Heilus
- Hilipinus
- Hoplopteridius
- Hormops
- Hylobius
- Hyperomorphus
- Iberoplinthus
- Karocolens
- Leiosoma
- Lepilius
- Lepyrus
- Liparus
- Lymantes
- Lyperobius
- Micralcinus
- Microhyus
- Micromastus
- Minyops
- Mitoplinthus
- Nanus
- Neoerethistes
- Neoplinthus
- Oromia
- Pachylobius
- Palaeocorynus
- Pheloconus
- Pissodes
- Plinthus
- Pseudechinosoma
- Rhyssomatus
- Steremnius
- Sternechus
- Sthereus
- Styphloderes
- Tymbopiptus
- Thalasselephas
- Trachodes
- Tranes
