= Aclees birmanus =

Scientific classification
- Kingdom: Animalia
- Phylum: Arthropoda
- Clade: Pancrustacea
- Class: Insecta
- Order: Coleoptera
- Suborder: Polyphaga
- Infraorder: Cucujiformia
- Superfamily: Curculionoidea
- Family: Curculionidae
- Genus: Aclees
- Species: A. birmanus

Binomial name
- Aclees birmanus J.Faust, 1895

Species of beetle

Aclees birmanus is a species of weevil found in India and Sri Lanka.

== Description ==
Adult beetle is about 12 to 15 mm.

== Biology ==
Larval stage is considered as a pest which bores through the wood. It's known to bore the wood of Ficus elastica previously damaged by the longicorn Batocera rubus. Other than that, it is also observed in Artocarpus integrifolius and Ficus religiosa.
