= Micralcinus =

Scientific classification
- Kingdom: Animalia
- Phylum: Arthropoda
- Class: Insecta
- Order: Coleoptera
- Suborder: Polyphaga
- Infraorder: Cucujiformia
- Family: Curculionidae
- Subfamily: Molytinae
- Genus: Micralcinus; LeConte, 1876

Genus of beetles

Micralcinus is a genus of true weevils in the beetle family Curculionidae. There are about five described species in Micralcinus.

== Species ==
These five species belong to the genus Micralcinus:

- Micralcinus cribratus LeConte, 1876
- Micralcinus kalmbachi Buchanan, 1927
- Micralcinus maculatus (Blatchley, 1916)
- Micralcinus parvulus
- Micralcinus stehri Sleeper, 1955
