= Hormops =

Scientific classification
- Kingdom: Animalia
- Phylum: Arthropoda
- Class: Insecta
- Order: Coleoptera
- Suborder: Polyphaga
- Infraorder: Cucujiformia
- Family: Curculionidae
- Genus: Hormops; LeConte, 1876

Genus of beetles

Hormops is a genus of true weevils in the beetle family Curculionidae. There are at least two described species in Hormops.

== Species ==
These two species belong to the genus Hormops:

- Hormops abducens LeConte, 1876
- Hormops latipennis Casey, 1924
