= Avocado production in Mexico =

The Avocado Belt in Michoacán

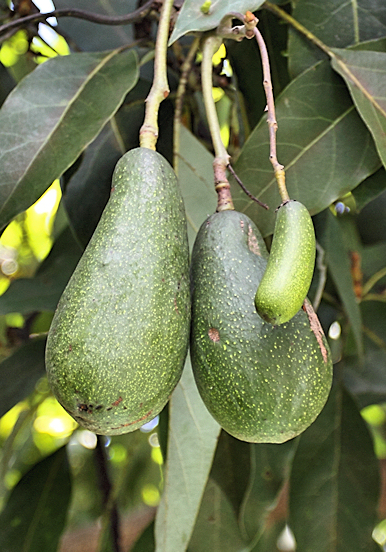
Avocados growing in Oaxaca.

Mexico is the world's largest producer of avocados, making avocado cultivation a major part of the country's economy, agriculture, and history. As of 2023, Mexico produced approximately 3 million tons of avocados, accounting for 29% of global output. The crop is most heavily grown in the 'Avocado Belt', primarily Michoacán and the State of Mexico. The major cultivars in Mexico are Fuerte, Hass, Bacon, Reed, Criollo, and Zutano.

Avocado farming is very important to local economies and has deep historical roots. Demand for Mexican avocados has driven growth in employment, supply chain complexity, and exports. However, growth has led to environmental consequences such as deforestation and water scarcity. There are also social challenges, including organized crime and cartel involvement, which affects locals and local communities.

== History and cultivation ==
The avocado is native to Central Mexico where its ancient history, established by archaeological evidence from Claude Earle Smith Jr., who discovered avocado cotyledon remains within deposits of the Coxcatlán Cave, in Tehuacán, in Puebla state, that date back to about 10,000 years ago. Nuevo León state has remnants of primitive avocado trees. It later spread to other countries in the Americas, including the United States. It is a "functional food" in the Americas; the many varieties which grow in Mexico suit the climatic conditions.

Ancient residents of Mexico including the Aztecs and other indigenous groups thought that the form of a fruit contributed to its properties. Therefore, eating avocado promoted strength and virility. 16th-century Spanish colonial documentation of Indian medicinal plant usage reaffirms this association, noting the fruit's reputation as an aphrodisiac, as well as its propensity for aiding childbirth and reducing inflammation and indigestion. The avocado likely also held cultural meaning for the Maya, who believed in the rebirth of their ancestors as trees and were therefore known to surround their houses with fruit trees, including avocados.

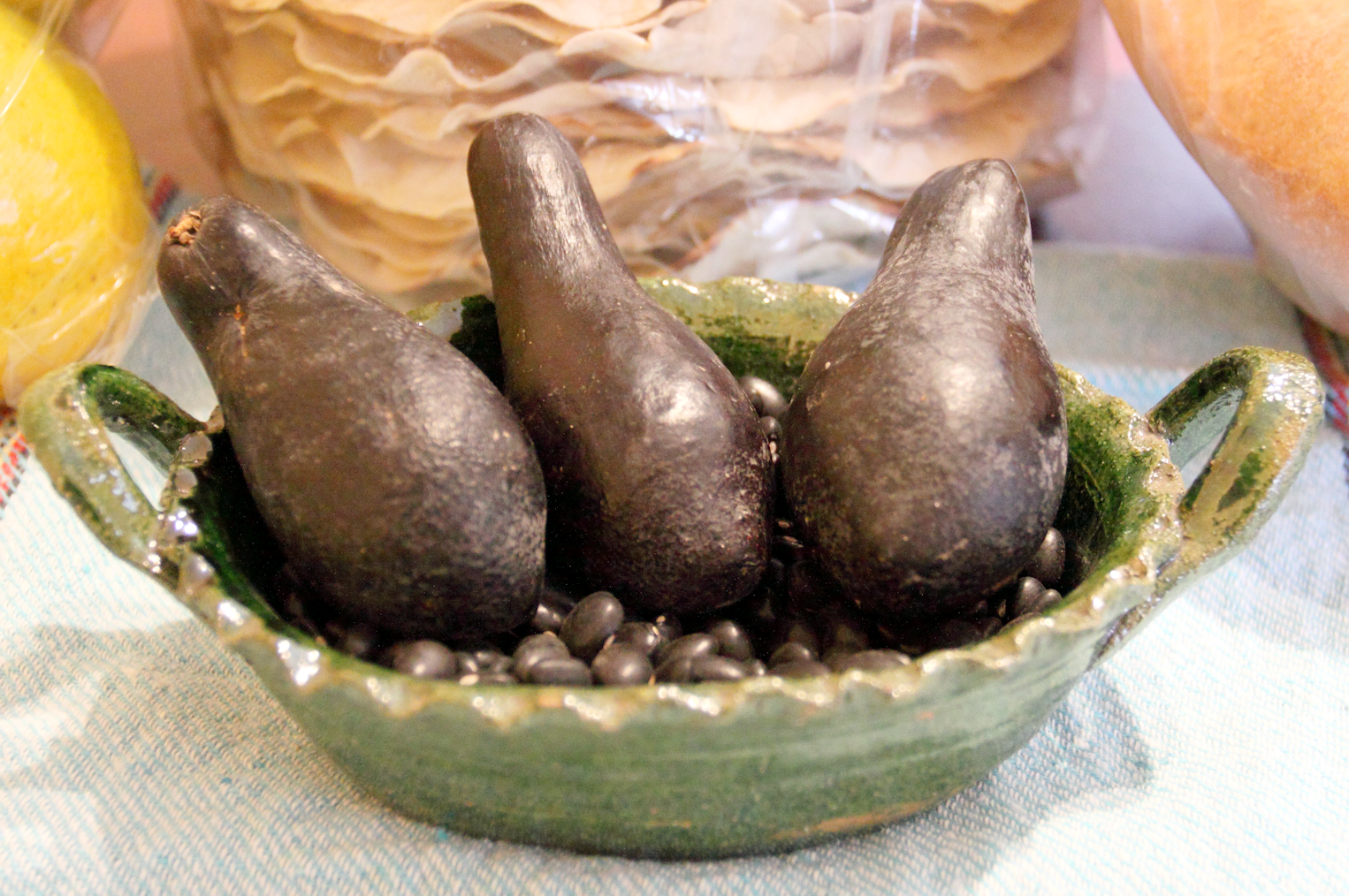
Avocado criollo from Oaxaca.

In the 1950s, orchards of Fuerte cultivar were established; two decades later, orchards of Hass cultivar were established, and it became the country's leading cultivar. This cultivar emerged when a postal worker in Southern California, Rudolph Hass, took a leap of faith to purchase a small 1.5-acre grove in La Habra Heights to experiment with growing high-yield avocado trees. The graft he settled upon and patented in 1935 was predominantly Guatemalan with some Mexican genes. It produced fruits that were a darker shade of purple than many were accustomed to, but was tastier, less oily, and kept better. Hass' profits from his patent through its expiration in 1960 summed a meager $4800. Today, more than 85% of avocados grown globally are of the Hass variety. Hass avocados have shown susceptibility to pests such as Persea mites and avocado thrips.

In 2007, the avocado was Mexico's fifth-ranked fruit crop. Being a staple food, the majority of avocados produced in Mexico are consumed in the country. Fresh domestic consumption for 2010-11 was forecast at 806,119 metric tons (888,594 short tons; 793,388 long tons), representing an 8.45 percent increase over the previous year.

== Production ==
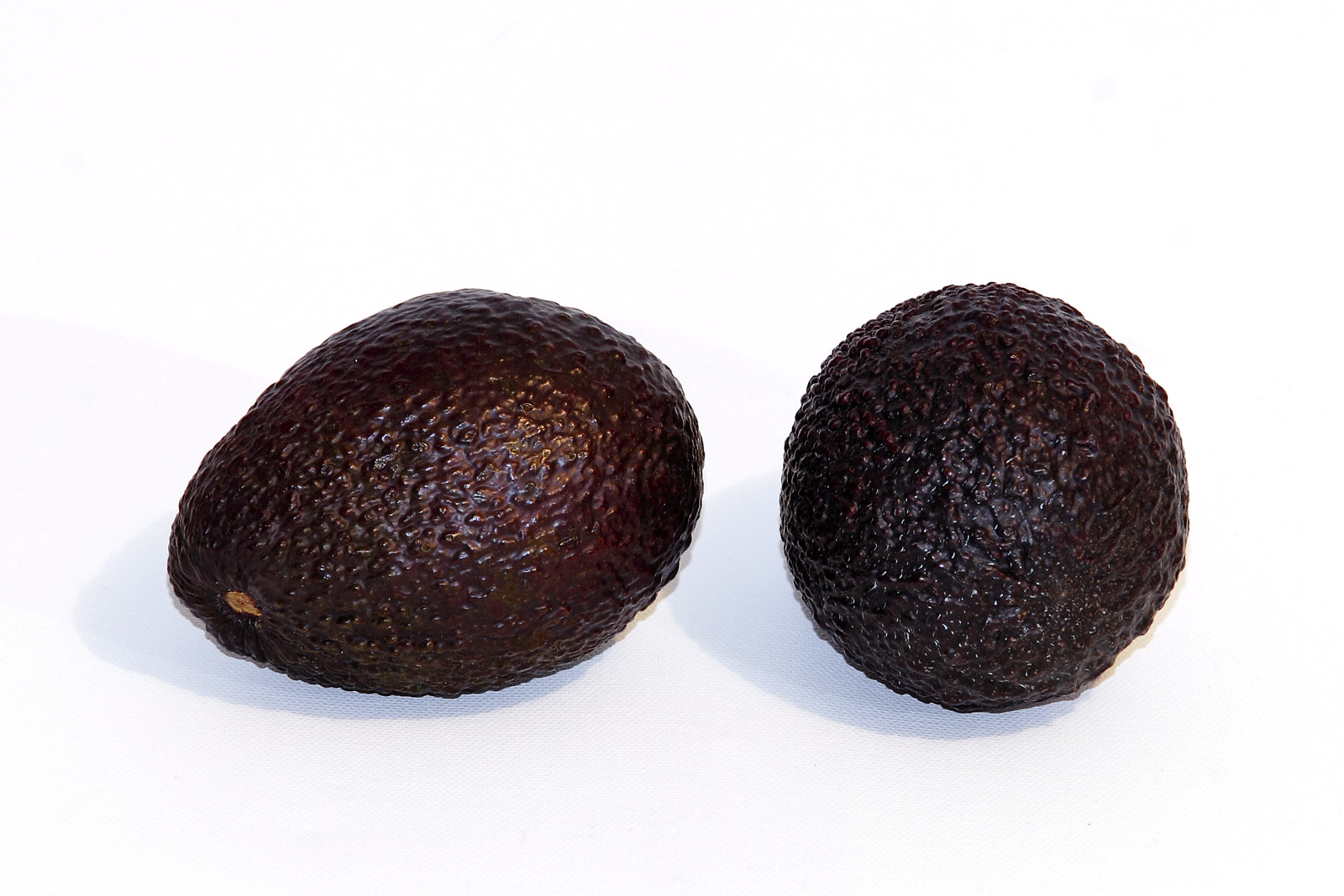
Hass is the leading avocado cultivar in Mexico.

Mexican avocado production is concentrated in Michoacán state in west central Mexico. Accounting for 92% of the country's production of the crop, Michoacán leads the world in avocado production, with approximately 106,000 hectares (260,000 acres). New regulations, effective in 2026, require deforestation-free certification for any orchard exporting to international markets. Orchards deforested after 2019 are excluded from such certifications. The yield reported from Michoacán is 4 metric tons per hectare (1.6 long ton/acre; 1.8 short ton/acre) and can reach up to 8 metric tons per hectare (3.2 long ton/acre; 3.6 short ton/acre), much higher than comparable figures in the U.S. state of California.

The favorable conditions for large production in the country is on account of availability of land, cheap labour, and rainfall pattern. Harvesting techniques incorporate hand-held poles and baskets, picking the crop when it is mature, though still hard. In 1985, production estimates were 401,000 metric tons (442,000 short tons; 395,000 long tons).

During the period 2001 to 2011, its production increased from 9,400,000 metric tons (10,400,000 short tons; 9,300,000 long tons) to 12,640,000 metric tons (13,930,000 short tons; 12,440,000 long tons). During the same period, exports from Mexico, which was the largest among all countries, increased from 893,000 metric tons (984,000 short tons; 879,000 long tons) to 3,470,000 metric tons (3,830,000 short tons; 3,420,000 long tons). As of 2003, the land area under this cultivar was 348,769 ha (861,830 acres) with a production of 2,583,226 metric tons (2,847,519 short tons; 2,542,428 long tons) a year.

In the year 2013, FAO reported 21,511 producers of avocado in Mexico out of which 10,000 were from Michoacán. This also created 279 packinghouses and domestic traders and 17 packinghouses/exporters. Fourteen processing industries came to be established which produced products such as guacamole, pulp, halves, frozen products, beverages and non-refined oil. These activities created more than 78,000 direct jobs, about 300,000 seasonal jobs, and more than 180,000 indirect permanent jobs in farming, harvesting, packing, transporting, and marketing.

Tancítaro, Michoacán has declared itself "the avocado capital of the world" and holds an annual Avocado Festival.

== Supply chain ==
Avocado supply chains are opaque, involve multiple actors, and cross vast distances. This opacity reduces communication across the supply chain, suppresses information on production conditions, and increases the risk of environmental and social harm. Export tracking is overseen by a multi-agency Technical Commission, which verifies compliance with labor, environmental, and phytosanitary requirements. Mexican exporters maintain a farm-tracking database at the carton level, but they only communicate the country of origin to retailers and end-consumers.

Recently, the avocado supply chain has been facing quite a few issues as demand for avocados increases globally. The industry is struggling to keep up with the level of demand and this demand is only expected to increase in the coming years as Latin America takes control of the worlds avocado production. Along with this comes the issue of sustainable agriculture since avocado monocultures are depleting soil nutrients and leading to less healthy soils, as well as decreased growth of plants and fruits. This has and will significantly impact the avocado supply chain if production decreases due to environmental degradation. However, this doesn't have to be the case if the industry would involve more small-scale farmers and implement more environmentally friendly practices such as eliminating current monocropping trends.

== Environmental impacts ==
Between 2001 and 2017, avocado production was responsible for about one-fifth of all deforestation that happened in the Michoacán region. Many parts of this region are also designated as Key Biological Areas (KBAs) which are areas that are important to endangered species and areas are crucial for environmental protection. The agricultural processes that have been implemented in the production of avocados has also led to water shortages in the area as well as pollution of agricultural chemicals. Each avocado grown in parts of Mexico may require up to 320 liters of applied water, contributing to drying rivers and community resource conflicts.

Avocado production in Michoacán

Several studies point to avocado expansion as the main driver of deforestation in Michoacán. These studies also show a trend in avocado production in Michoacán leading to issues of habitat fragmentation and lowered sequestration of carbon. Satellite data from 2025 revealed more than 300 formal complaints regarding illegal deforestation for avocado expansion in Michoacán. Additionally, between 2004 and 2014 montane and tropical forest cover has significantly decreased in avocado production regions of Michoacán. Many of these studies have also shown that the United States is a key driver of deforestation in Mexico through their demand for avocados and the role that large corporations play in the industry. The United States imports about 80 percent of all avocado exports from Mexico which totals around 3 billion dollars each year. Much of this avocado production is a result of illegal deforestation that has taken place, and many US companies continue to sell avocados that have been harvested in these areas.

== Exports ==
Its export potential is constrained due to the quality of the product. Exports increased more than 4-fold in the period from 2000 to 2011, and in 2011 it accounted for 27.45 percent of its total production of 12,640,000 metric tons (13,930,000 short tons; 12,440,000 long tons). Its export in the raw form is limited due to the problem of several species of avocado weevils. Beginning in 1914, the US began restricting avocado imports to reduce the chances of weevil outbreaks. These restrictions were eliminated in 1997, building on momentum from the North American Free Trade Agreement to encourage cross-continental exchange. Avocado products like avocado pulp, avocado paste and guacamole are more popular for exports, and in this form its export to the US matched the import of value of all imported fresh avocados. The exports of avocados from Mexico in the U.S reached 1.7 billion in 2016, according to AFM, as American per capita consumption of avocados has increased seven-fold from 2000 to 2016.

In February 18, 2022, Mexico and the United States agreed "to enact the measures that ensure safety" of agricultural inspectors, after one US inspector received a threat "against him and his family."

== Cartel involvement ==
The 2006 War on Drugs led to a decrease in drug profitability among organized crime groups, prompting them to move into more licit industries between 2009 and 2013. Cartels began to extract protection payments from avocado producers and seized land, particularly in Michoacán, cutting growers' profits and increasing violence. Since then the cartels have managed to break into the mango, lime, and avocado industries. The export of avocados to the U.S. brings in $2.8 billion a year, with a high of $3.1 billion in 2022, to the Mexican economy, with cartels making $770 million from avocado production.

From the late 2010s and early 2020s avocado farming in Mexico has been significantly impacted by gang racketeering (see Pueblos Unidos). Avocado farmers have become targets for the cartels leading to an increase in civilian-on-cartel violence. From 2011 to 2019 there has been an increase in homicides related to the cartels, a large demographic being affected by this violence being agricultural workers. This violence notably takes the form of kidnapping of family and murder if farmers refuse to pay "protection fees" to the cartels. The cartels have also, unintentionally, been growing the avocado industry by logging on protected forests and diverting local water sources to irrigate their farms. Another aspect is their influence on the market, by forcing farmers to only work on certain days of the week, they have played a part in increasing the prices of the fruit through market manipulation. Michoacán, is the epicenter of this cartel violence, as the majority of the avocados are grown in the region. Cartels active in this area at the Jalisco New Generation Cartel (CJNG), Nueva Familia Michoacana, the Tepalcatepec Cartel, and Zincuirán Cartel. These cartels often compete against each other for the "green gold" known as avocados.

The CJNG in particular have had the most violent encounters as they are already a well-established cartel. In 2019 they killed nine people in Urapan and hung the corpses of their victims over a prominent overpass in the city.

Due to the high cartel violence, many communities have banded together and have begun taking measures against the cartels. For affluent towns rent the police to defend their farms and workers from the cartels. However, for communities that can't afford to rent out a police force, they may form their own militias, sometimes referred to as "autodefensa" groups. Several such examples are the farmers of Tancítaro and their Tancítaro Public Security Force and the anti-avocado militia of Cherán. Both of these cities have different ways of approaching the avocado cartel problem. For Cherán, it is the outright banning of avocado production. Planting or logging to plant avocados is outright outlawed. Any farmer caught planting avocados are sent to the town jail and must pay a fee. If the offense is repeated the land is requisitioned by the government. On the other hand, Tancítaro has come up with an opposite countermeasure. They still allow the export of avocados as it is a lucrative export for the city. The differences is they have bolstered the city's defenses through the use of bomb-proof checkpoints and a volunteer defense force to protect their avocado farms.

== See also ==
- Agriculture in Mexico
- List of countries by avocado production
