= List of Heilipus species =

This is a list of 283 species in Heilipus, a genus of pine weevils in the family Curculionidae.

== Heilipus species ==
- Heilipus acatium Boheman, 1835^{c}
- Heilipus acutissimus Boheman, 1843^{c}
- Heilipus adjectus Hustache, 1938^{c}
- Heilipus admixtus Hustache, 1938^{c}
- Heilipus affinis Guérin-Méneville, 1844^{c}
- Heilipus ahrensii Boheman, 1843^{c}
- Heilipus alternans Guérin-Méneville, 1844^{c}
- Heilipus amictus Hustache, 1938^{c}
- Heilipus anguliferus Boheman, 1843^{c}
- Heilipus annuliger Schoenherr, 1843^{c}
- Heilipus apiatus (Olivier, 1807)^{i c b} (avocado weevil)
- Heilipus argentinicus Heller, 1921^{c}
- Heilipus arrogans Pascoe, F.P., 1889^{c}
- Heilipus ascius Germar, 1824^{c}
- Heilipus asperulus Erichson, 1847^{c}
- Heilipus audouini Boheman, 1835^{c}
- Heilipus aurantiaco-cinctus Lucas in Castelnau, 1859^{c}
- Heilipus baiulus Erichson, 1847^{c}
- Heilipus balteatus Boheman, 1843^{c}
- Heilipus bartelsi Boheman, 1835^{c}
- Heilipus bellicosus Schoenherr, 1835^{c}
- Heilipus bidentatus Guérin-Méneville, 1844^{c}
- Heilipus bifurcatus Hustache, 1938^{c}
- Heilipus bimaculatus Boheman, 1843^{c}
- Heilipus binotatus Dejean, 1830^{c}
- Heilipus bioculatus Boheman, 1843^{c}
- Heilipus biplagiatus Boheman, 1843^{c}
- Heilipus bipunctatus Boheman, 1843^{c}
- Heilipus bisignatus Dejean, 1830^{c}
- Heilipus bistigma Hustache, 1938^{c}
- Heilipus bohemani Boheman, 1843^{c}
- Heilipus bohemanii Guérin-Méneville, 1844^{c}
- Heilipus boliviensis Hustache, 1924^{c}
- Heilipus bonelli Boheman, 1835^{c}
- Heilipus brevicornis Hustache, 1938^{c}
- Heilipus brunneus Boheman, 1835^{c}
- Heilipus buquetii Guérin-Méneville, 1844^{c}
- Heilipus cadivus Germar, 1824^{c}
- Heilipus callosus Boheman, 1843^{c}
- Heilipus carinifrons Hustache, 1930^{c}
- Heilipus carinirostris Boheman, 1835^{c}
- Heilipus catagraphus Germar, 1824^{c}
- Heilipus caudatus Sturm, 1826^{c}
- Heilipus cauterius Boheman, 1843^{c}
- Heilipus celsus Boheman, 1835^{c}
- Heilipus cestatus Boheman, 1835^{c}
- Heilipus championi Marshall, 1930^{c}
- Heilipus chevrolatii Guérin-Méneville, 1844^{c}
- Heilipus choicus Schoenherr, 1835^{c}
- Heilipus clavipes Schoenherr, 1825^{c}
- Heilipus colon Cristofori & Jan, 1832^{c}
- Heilipus commaculatus Boheman, 1835^{c}
- Heilipus comtus Boheman, 1843^{c}
- Heilipus conspersus Schoenherr, 1835^{c}
- Heilipus contaminatus Boheman, 1843^{c}
- Heilipus coronatus Boheman, 1835^{c}
- Heilipus corruptor Boheman, 1835^{c}
- Heilipus costalis Boheman, 1835^{c}
- Heilipus costirostris Boheman, 1835^{c}
- Heilipus crassirostris Guérin-Méneville, 1844^{c}
- Heilipus cribratus Dejean,^{c}
- Heilipus crispus Boheman, 1843^{c}
- Heilipus crocopelmus Boheman, 1843^{c}
- Heilipus cruciatus Chevrolat, 1833^{c}
- Heilipus cultripes Erichson, 1847^{c}
- Heilipus cuvieri Boheman, 1843^{c}
- Heilipus cylindripennis Hustache, 1924^{c}
- Heilipus cymba Boheman, 1835^{c}
- Heilipus dahlbomi Boheman, 1835^{c}
- Heilipus decipiens Dejean, 1830^{c}
- Heilipus decussatus Boheman, 1843^{c}
- Heilipus degeeri Boheman, 1835^{c}
- Heilipus deletangi Hustache, 1924^{c}
- Heilipus delicatulus Hustache, 1938^{c}
- Heilipus destructor Schoenherr, 1835^{c}
- Heilipus difficilis Boheman, 1837^{c}
- Heilipus dimidiatus Boheman, 1835^{c}
- Heilipus discoides Schoenherr, 1843^{c}
- Heilipus dorbignyi Guérin-Méneville, 1844^{c}
- Heilipus dorsalis Sturm, 1826^{c}
- Heilipus dorsosulcatus Boheman, 1843^{c}
- Heilipus dorsualis Boheman, 1835^{c}
- Heilipus draco Schoenherr, 1843^{c}
- Heilipus echinatus Boheman, 1835^{c}
- Heilipus egenus Boheman, 1835^{c}
- Heilipus elegans Guérin-Méneville, 1844^{c}
- Heilipus elongatus Rheinheimer, 2012^{g}
- Heilipus erythrocephalus Boheman, 1843^{c}
- Heilipus erythropus Dejean,^{c}
- Heilipus erythrorhynchus Schoenherr, 1826^{c}
- Heilipus erythrorrhynchus Germar, E.F., 1824^{c}
- Heilipus erytrocephalus Boheman, 1843^{c}
- Heilipus esmarki Boheman, C.H. in Schönherr, C.J., 1843^{c}
- Heilipus esmarkii Boheman, 1843^{c}
- Heilipus fahraei Boheman, 1836^{c}
- Heilipus faldermanni Boheman, 1835^{c}
- Heilipus fallax Boheman, 1843^{c}
- Heilipus falsus Hustache, 1938^{c}
- Heilipus famulus Boheman, 1843^{c}
- Heilipus fasciculatus Boheman, 1843^{c}
- Heilipus flammiger Schoenherr, 1835^{c}
- Heilipus fohraei Boheman, 1835^{c}
- Heilipus fossilis Thomson J., 1859^{c}
- Heilipus freyreissi Boheman, 1835^{c}
- Heilipus friesi Boheman, C.H. in Schönherr, C.J., 1836^{c}
- Heilipus friesii Boheman, 1835^{c}
- Heilipus gayi Boheman, 1843^{c}
- Heilipus germari Boheman, 1835^{c}
- Heilipus gibbus ^{g}
- Heilipus gistelii Gistel, 1848^{c}
- Heilipus globulicollis Boheman, 1843^{c}
- Heilipus granellus Boheman, 1843^{c}
- Heilipus granicostatus Boheman, 1843^{c}
- Heilipus granosus Klug, 1850^{c}
- Heilipus granulifer Boheman, 1843^{c}
- Heilipus granulospinosus Brèthes, 1920^{c}
- Heilipus guttatus Boheman, 1843^{c}
- Heilipus guyanensis Hustache, 1938^{c}
- Heilipus gyllenhalii Guérin-Méneville, 1844^{c}
- Heilipus honestus Cristofori & Jan, 1832^{c}
- Heilipus hopei Boheman, 1843^{c}
- Heilipus hummeli Boheman, 1835^{c}
- Heilipus hylobioides Boheman, 1843^{c}
- Heilipus illigeri Boheman, 1835^{c}
- Heilipus immundus Kirsch, T., 1868^{c}
- Heilipus inaequalis Boheman, 1835^{c}
- Heilipus inclusus Hustache, 1938^{c}
- Heilipus ineptus Boheman, 1835^{c}
- Heilipus integellus Boheman, 1843^{c}
- Heilipus interstinctus Boheman, 1843^{c}
- Heilipus intricatus Boheman, 1835^{c}
- Heilipus jocosus Boheman, 1835^{c}
- Heilipus lacordairei Boheman, 1843^{c}
- Heilipus lactarius Germar, 1824^{c}
- Heilipus laetabilis Schoenherr, 1843^{c}
- Heilipus laevicollis Boheman, 1843^{c}
- Heilipus laqueatus Erichson, 1847^{c}
- Heilipus lateralis Schoenherr, 1835^{c}
- Heilipus latro Gyllenhal, 1835^{c}
- Heilipus lauri Boheman, 1845^{i c}
- Heilipus lembunculus Boheman, 1835^{c}
- Heilipus leoninus Boheman, 1843^{c}
- Heilipus leopardus Boheman, 1835^{c}
- Heilipus letabilis Boheman, 1843^{c}
- Heilipus leucomelanostigma Boheman, 1843^{c}
- Heilipus leucomelas Klug,^{c}
- Heilipus lituratus Boheman, 1843^{c}
- Heilipus loricatus Boheman, 1843^{c}
- Heilipus ludiosus Marshall, 1952^{c}
- Heilipus maculosus Boheman, 1835^{c}
- Heilipus margaritifer Boheman, 1843^{c}
- Heilipus marginalis Dejean,^{c}
- Heilipus marklini Boheman, 1835^{c}
- Heilipus marmoratus Schoenherr, 1843^{c}
- Heilipus marmoreus Schoenherr, 1843^{c}
- Heilipus medioximus Boheman, 1843^{c}
- Heilipus melanopus Perty, 1832^{c}
- Heilipus meles Boheman, 1843^{c}
- Heilipus mendozensis Hustache, 1938^{c}
- Heilipus menetriesi Boheman, 1835^{c}
- Heilipus miliaris Pascoe, F.P., 1881^{c}
- Heilipus mixtus Blanchard, 1846^{c}
- Heilipus moestificus Boheman, 1835^{c}
- Heilipus mortuus Thomson, J., 1859^{c}
- Heilipus multigutattus Schoenherr, 1825^{c}
- Heilipus multiguttatus Dejean, 1830^{c}
- Heilipus multipunctatus Erichson, 1847^{c}
- Heilipus multisignatus Boheman, 1835^{c}
- Heilipus muricatus Boheman, 1835^{c}
- Heilipus myops Boheman, 1835^{c}
- Heilipus naevulus Mannerheim, 1835^{c}
- Heilipus nisseri Boheman, 1835^{c}
- Heilipus nodifer Boheman, 1843^{c}
- Heilipus norrisii Guérin-Méneville, 1844^{c}
- Heilipus nubilosus Boheman, 1835^{c}
- Heilipus obliquus Boheman, 1843^{c}
- Heilipus occultus Pascoe, F.P., 1881^{c}
- Heilipus ocellatus Schoenherr, 1835^{c}
- Heilipus ochraceofasciatus Hustache, 1938^{c}
- Heilipus ochrifer Boheman, 1843^{c}
- Heilipus oculatus Schoenherr, 1826^{c}
- Heilipus odoratus Vanin & Gaiger, 2005^{c}
- Heilipus okeni Boheman, 1835^{c}
- Heilipus onychinus Schoenherr, 1825^{c}
- Heilipus osculatii Guérin, 1855^{g}
- Heilipus paleoliferus Boheman, 1843^{c}
- Heilipus pantherinus Dejean, 1835^{c}
- Heilipus panzeri Boheman, 1843^{c}
- Heilipus parcus Boheman, 1843^{c}
- Heilipus pardus Schoenherr, 1843^{c}
- Heilipus parvulus Boheman, 1843^{c}
- Heilipus peplus Guerin-Meneville, 1833^{c}
- Heilipus perseae Barber, 1920^{c}
- Heilipus perturbatus Boheman, 1843^{c}
- Heilipus pertyi Schoenherr, 1843^{c}
- Heilipus piceirostris Hustache, 1938^{c}
- Heilipus picticollis Champion, 1925^{c}
- Heilipus picturatus Schoenherr, 1835^{c}
- Heilipus pictus Boheman, 1835^{c}
- Heilipus pissodeoides Boheman, 1835^{c}
- Heilipus pittieri Barber, 1919^{i c}
- Heilipus plagiatus Boheman, 1843^{c}
- Heilipus planiusculus Perty, 1832^{c}
- Heilipus polycoccus Boheman, 1835^{c}
- Heilipus polyguttatus Hustache, 1938^{c}
- Heilipus polymitus Schoenherr, 1825^{c}
- Heilipus potentator Germar,^{c}
- Heilipus prodigialis Schoenherr, 1825^{c}
- Heilipus prolixus Erichson, 1847^{c}
- Heilipus punctatoscabratus Boheman, 1843^{c}
- Heilipus punctatus Boheman, 1835^{c}
- Heilipus pupillatus Dejean, 1830^{c}
- Heilipus pusio Boheman, 1835^{c}
- Heilipus querulus Boheman, 1835^{c}
- Heilipus reichenbachi Boheman, 1843^{c}
- Heilipus retusus Boheman, 1835^{c}
- Heilipus roeseli Boheman, C.H. in Schönherr, C.J., 1836^{c}
- Heilipus roeselii Boheman, 1835^{c}
- Heilipus rufescens Boheman, 1835^{c}
- Heilipus rufipes Boheman, 1835^{c}
- Heilipus rufirostris Dejean, 1830^{c}
- Heilipus rugicollis Boheman, 1835^{c}
- Heilipus ruptus Marshall, 1949^{c}
- Heilipus rusticanus Boheman, 1835^{c}
- Heilipus rusticus Boheman, 1835^{c}
- Heilipus sahlbergi Boheman, 1843^{c}
- Heilipus saxosus Boheman, 1843^{c}
- Heilipus scabripennis Boheman, 1835^{c}
- Heilipus scalaris Westwood, 1837^{c}
- Heilipus scapha Boheman, 1835^{c}
- Heilipus schmidtii Boheman, 1843^{c}
- Heilipus schoenherri Boheman, 1835^{c}
- Heilipus scrobicollis Boheman, 1835^{c}
- Heilipus scrobiculatus Mannerheim, 1843^{c}
- Heilipus semiamictus Boheman, 1843^{c}
- Heilipus semivittatus Boheman, 1843^{c}
- Heilipus septus Marshall, 1949^{c}
- Heilipus signatipennis Blanchard, E. in Gay, 1851^{c}
- Heilipus similis Hustache, 1938^{c}
- Heilipus sinuatus Boheman, 1843^{c}
- Heilipus spathulatus Germar, 1824^{c}
- Heilipus spinosus Dejean, 1830^{c}
- Heilipus squamosus Boheman, 1835^{c}
- Heilipus stellifer Boheman, 1835^{c}
- Heilipus stellimicans Boheman, 1835^{c}
- Heilipus stempelmanni Voss, 1943^{c}
- Heilipus stigma Boheman, 1835^{c}
- Heilipus stratioticus Boheman, 1835^{c}
- Heilipus strator Boheman, 1835^{c}
- Heilipus subcostatus Boheman, 1843^{c}
- Heilipus subfasciatus Blanchard, E. in Gay, 1851^{c}
- Heilipus submaculatus Boheman, 1835^{c}
- Heilipus subpartitus Boheman, 1843^{c}
- Heilipus taciturnus Boheman, 1843^{c}
- Heilipus testudo Schoenherr, 1843^{c}
- Heilipus tomentosus Guérin-Méneville, 1844^{c}
- Heilipus trachypterus Schoenherr, 1825^{c}
- Heilipus tricarinatus Boheman, 1843^{c}
- Heilipus tricolor Perty, 1832^{c}
- Heilipus trifasciatus (Fabricius, J.C., 1787)^{c g}
- Heilipus tripunctatus Chevrolat, 1840^{g}
- Heilipus troglodytes Boheman, 1835^{c}
- Heilipus tuberculatus Boheman, 1835^{c}
- Heilipus tuberculosus Perty, 1832^{c}
- Heilipus tugusti Boheman, 1843^{c}
- Heilipus turrialbae Champion, 1925^{c}
- Heilipus undabundus Boheman, 1835^{c}
- Heilipus unguiculatus Boheman, 1843^{c}
- Heilipus urosus Boheman, 1843^{c}
- Heilipus ustulatus Schoenherr, 1835^{c}
- Heilipus variegatus Perty, 1832^{c}
- Heilipus velamen Boheman, 1835^{c}
- Heilipus ventralis Hustache, 1938^{c}
- Heilipus verrucosus Erichson, 1847^{c}
- Heilipus vicinus Hustache, 1924^{c}
- Heilipus viduus Guérin-Méneville, 1844^{c}
- Heilipus westringii Boheman, 1843^{c}
- Heilipus wiedemanni Boheman, 1835^{c}
- Heilipus yatahyensis Hustache, 1924^{c}
- Heilipus zetterstedtii Boheman, 1843^{c}
- Heilipus ziegleri Boheman, 1843^{c}
- Heilipus zonatus Boheman, 1843^{c}
- Heilipus zoubkoffii Boheman, 1843^{c}

Data sources: i = ITIS, c = Catalogue of Life, g = GBIF, b = Bugguide.net
