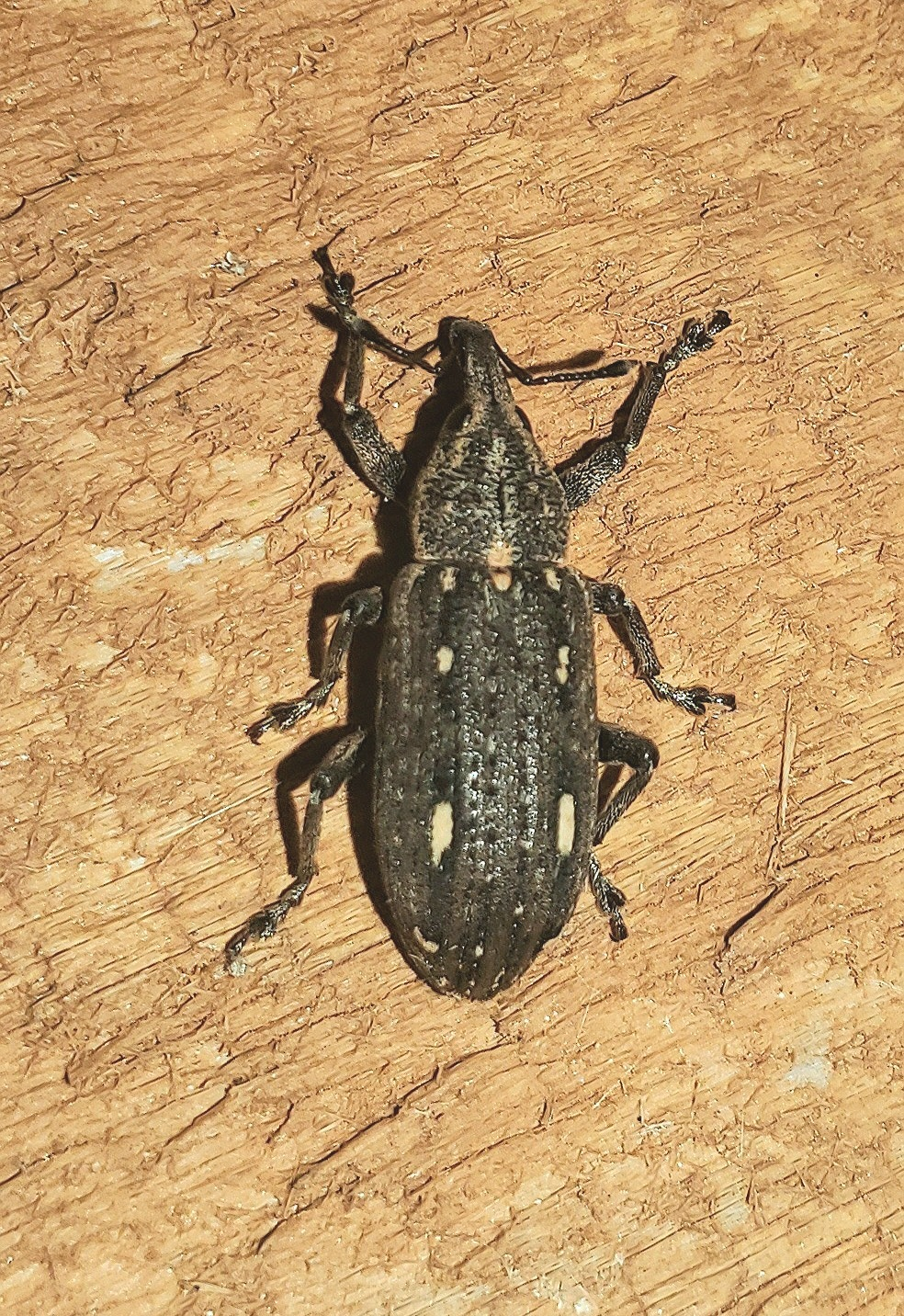

Scientific classification
- Kingdom: Animalia
- Phylum: Arthropoda
- Class: Insecta
- Order: Coleoptera
- Suborder: Polyphaga
- Infraorder: Cucujiformia
- Family: Curculionidae
- Genus: Eudociminus
- Species: E. mannerheimii

Binomial name
- Eudociminus mannerheimii (Boheman, 1836)

= Eudociminus mannerheimii =

Cypress weevil

Species of beetle

Eudociminus mannerheimii, the cypress weevil, is a species of pine weevil in the beetle family Curculionidae.
