= Hilipinus =

Scientific classification
- Kingdom: Animalia
- Phylum: Arthropoda
- Clade: Pancrustacea
- Class: Insecta
- Order: Coleoptera
- Suborder: Polyphaga
- Infraorder: Cucujiformia
- Superfamily: Curculionoidea
- Family: Curculionidae
- Tribe: Hylobiini
- Genus: Hilipinus; Champion, 1902

Genus of beetles

Hilipinus is a genus of pine weevils in the beetle family Curculionidae. There are at least 50 described species in Hilipinus.

== Species ==
These 50 species belong to the genus Hilipinus:

- Hilipinus acatium Kuschel, 1955
- Hilipinus acutissimus Kuschel, 1955
- Hilipinus aequabilis Kuschel, 1955
- Hilipinus alternatus Kuschel, 1955
- Hilipinus amictus Kuschel, 1955
- Hilipinus ascius Champion, 1902
- Hilipinus bartelsi Champion, 1902
- Hilipinus biannulatus Champion, 1910
- Hilipinus biguttatus Champion, 1902
- Hilipinus biplagiatus Chevrolat & Laa, 1902
- Hilipinus brulei Rheinheimer, 2010
- Hilipinus cadivus Kuschel, 1955
- Hilipinus corruptor Champion, 1902
- Hilipinus costirostris Kuschel, 1955
- Hilipinus curvirostris Champion, 1902
- Hilipinus dahlbomi Champion, 1902
- Hilipinus dentirostris Champion, 1902
- Hilipinus egenus Champion, 1902
- Hilipinus friesi Champion, 1902
- Hilipinus fusiformis Champion, 1902
- Hilipinus granicostatus Champion, 1902
- Hilipinus granosus Champion, 1906
- Hilipinus guatemalensis Champion, 1902
- Hilipinus guyanensis (Hustache, 1938)
- Hilipinus ingens Champion, 1902
- Hilipinus integellus Champion, 1902
- Hilipinus lacordairei Champion, 1902
- Hilipinus laticollis Champion, 1902
- Hilipinus maculosus Kuschel, 1955
- Hilipinus medioximus Champion, 1902
- Hilipinus moraguesi Rheinheimer, 2010
- Hilipinus mortuus Champion, 1902
- Hilipinus mucronatus Champion, 1902
- Hilipinus nearcticus O'Brien, 1982
- Hilipinus occultus Champion, 1902
- Hilipinus ochreopictus Champion, 1902
- Hilipinus plagiatus Kuschel, 1955
- Hilipinus planiusculus Kuschel, 1955
- Hilipinus punctatoscabratus Champion, 1902
- Hilipinus quadrimaculatus Champion, 1902
- Hilipinus sahlbergi Kuschel, 1955
- Hilipinus scabiosus Champion, 1902
- Hilipinus scapha (Boheman, 1835)
- Hilipinus stratioticus Kuschel, 1955
- Hilipinus strator Kuschel, 1955
- Hilipinus sulcicrus Champion, 1902
- Hilipinus sulcirostris Champion, 1902
- Hilipinus testudo Kuschel, 1955
- Hilipinus tetraspilotus Champion, 1902
- Hilipinus ziegleri Champion, 1902
