= Hylobius radicis =

Scientific classification
- Domain: Eukaryota
- Kingdom: Animalia
- Phylum: Arthropoda
- Class: Insecta
- Order: Coleoptera
- Suborder: Polyphaga
- Infraorder: Cucujiformia
- Family: Curculionidae
- Genus: Hylobius
- Species: H. radicis

Binomial name
- Hylobius radicis Buchanan, 1935

Species of beetle

Hylobius radicis, the pine root collar weevil, is a species of pine weevil in the beetle family Curculionidae. It is found in North America.
