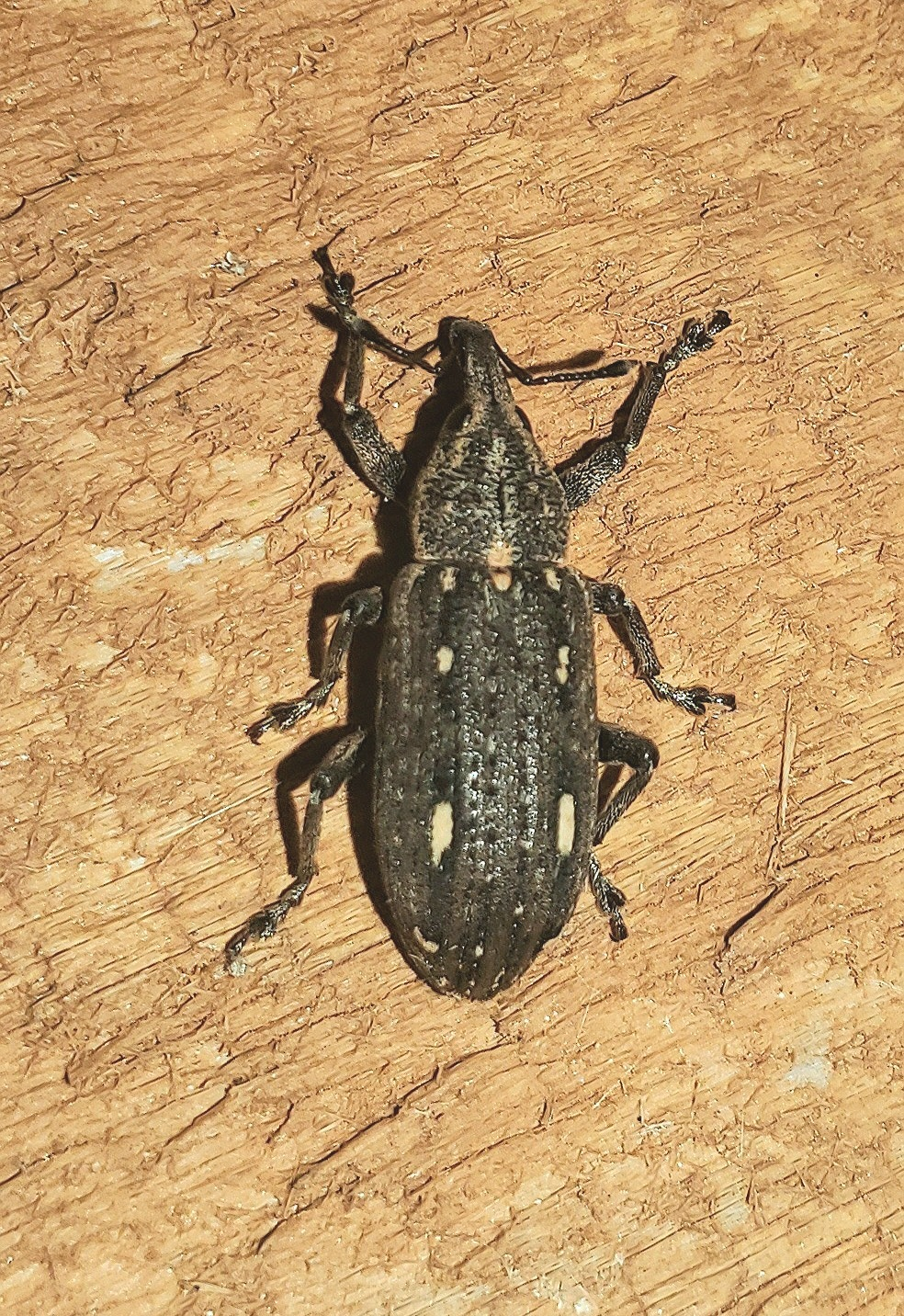
- Eudociminus mannerheimii

Scientific classification
- Kingdom: Animalia
- Phylum: Arthropoda
- Class: Insecta
- Order: Coleoptera
- Suborder: Polyphaga
- Infraorder: Cucujiformia
- Family: Curculionidae
- Tribe: Hylobiini
- Genus: Eudociminus; Leng, 1918

= Eudociminus =

Genus of beetles

Eudociminus is a genus of pine weevils in the beetle family Curculionidae. There are at least two described species in Eudociminus.

== Species ==
These two species belong to the genus Eudociminus:

- Eudociminus mannerheimi Boheman, 1836
- Eudociminus mannerheimii (Boheman, 1936) (cypress weevil)
