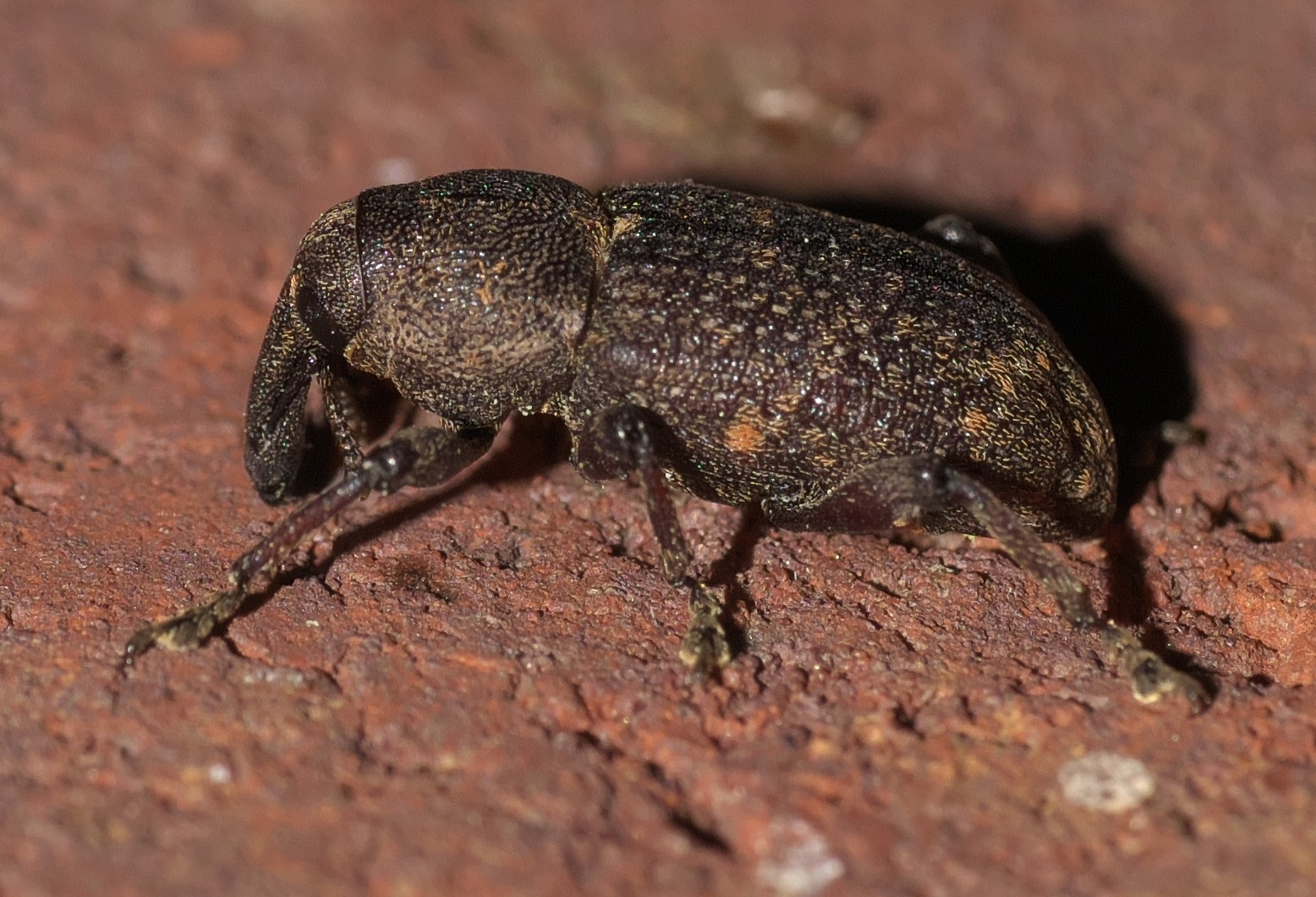
- Pachylobius picivorus, Oklahoma

Scientific classification
- Domain: Eukaryota
- Kingdom: Animalia
- Phylum: Arthropoda
- Class: Insecta
- Order: Coleoptera
- Suborder: Polyphaga
- Infraorder: Cucujiformia
- Family: Curculionidae
- Genus: Pachylobius
- Species: P. picivorus

Binomial name
- Pachylobius picivorus (Germar, 1824)

Synonyms
- Hylobius stupidus Boheman, 1834

= Pachylobius picivorus =

Species of beetle

Pachylobius picivorus, the pitch-eating weevil, is a species of pine weevil in the beetle family Curculionidae. It is found in North America.
