= Avocado weevil =

Avocado weevil may refer to one of a number of pest species known to cause harm to avocados.

- Conotrachelus aguacatae
- Conotrachelus perseae
- Copturus aguacatae
- Diaprepes abbreviatus
- Heilipus apiatus
- Heilipus lauri
