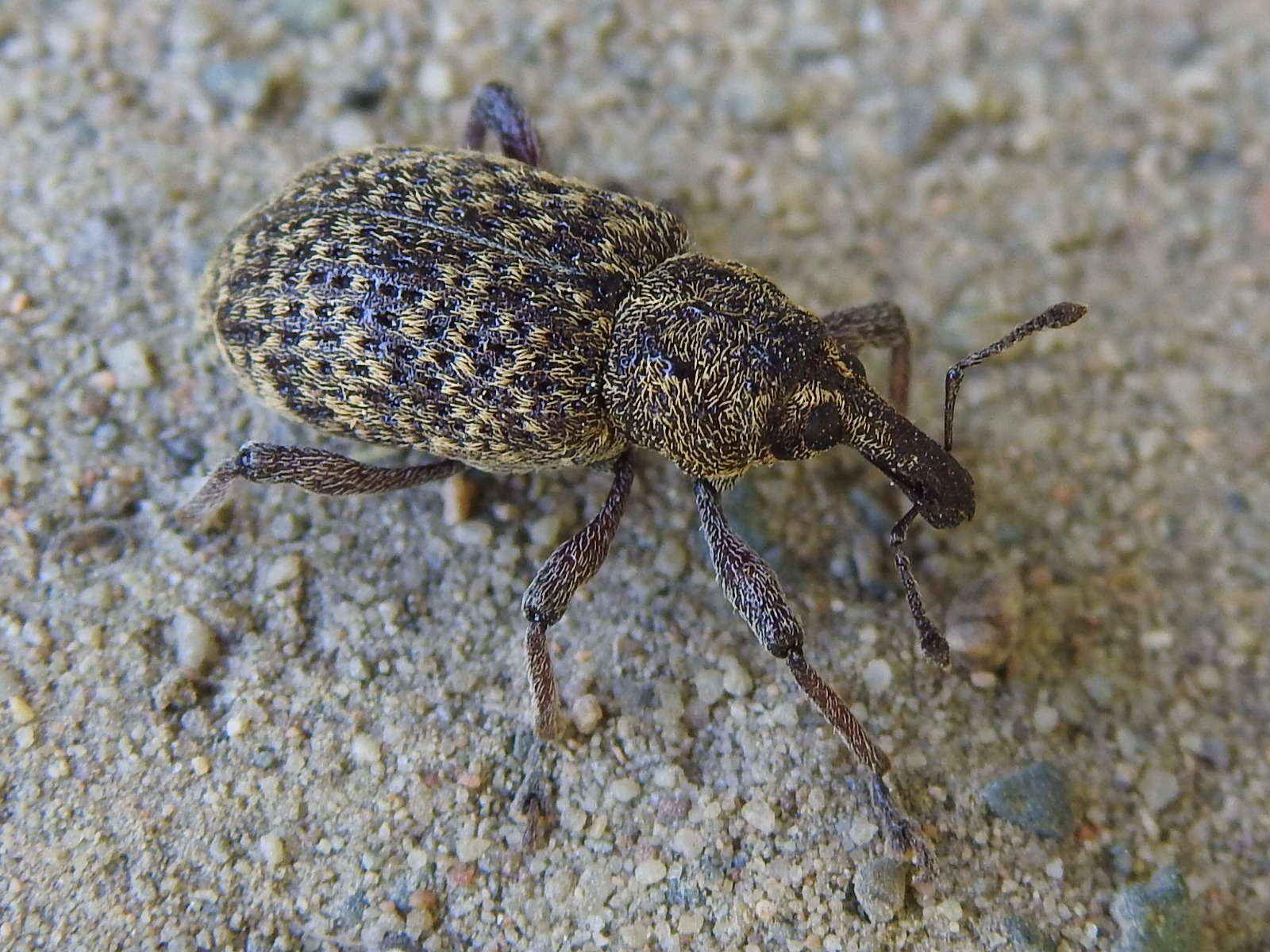

Scientific classification
- Domain: Eukaryota
- Kingdom: Animalia
- Phylum: Arthropoda
- Class: Insecta
- Order: Coleoptera
- Suborder: Polyphaga
- Infraorder: Cucujiformia
- Family: Curculionidae
- Genus: Hylobius
- Species: H. pinicola

Binomial name
- Hylobius pinicola (Couper, 1864)

= Hylobius pinicola =

Species of beetle

Hylobius pinicola,commonly known as the Couper collar weevil, is a species of pine weevil in the family of beetles known as Curculionidae. It is found in North America.
