= Pachylobius =

Scientific classification
- Kingdom: Animalia
- Phylum: Arthropoda
- Class: Insecta
- Order: Coleoptera
- Suborder: Polyphaga
- Infraorder: Cucujiformia
- Family: Curculionidae
- Tribe: Hylobiini
- Genus: Pachylobius; LeConte, 1876

Genus of beetles

Pachylobius is a genus of pine weevils in the beetle family Curculionidae. There are at least two described species in Pachylobius.

== Species ==
These two species belong to the genus Pachylobius:

- Pachylobius picivorus (Germar, 1824)^{i c b} (pitch-eating weevil)
- Pachylobius stupidus LeConte, J.L., 1876^{c}

Data sources: i = ITIS, c = Catalogue of Life, g = GBIF, b = Bugguide.net
