= Hilipinus nearcticus =

Scientific classification
- Domain: Eukaryota
- Kingdom: Animalia
- Phylum: Arthropoda
- Class: Insecta
- Order: Coleoptera
- Suborder: Polyphaga
- Infraorder: Cucujiformia
- Family: Curculionidae
- Genus: Hilipinus
- Species: H. nearcticus

Binomial name
- Hilipinus nearcticus O'Brien, 1982

Species of beetle

Hilipinus nearcticus is a species of pine weevil in the beetle family Curculionidae. It is found in North America.
