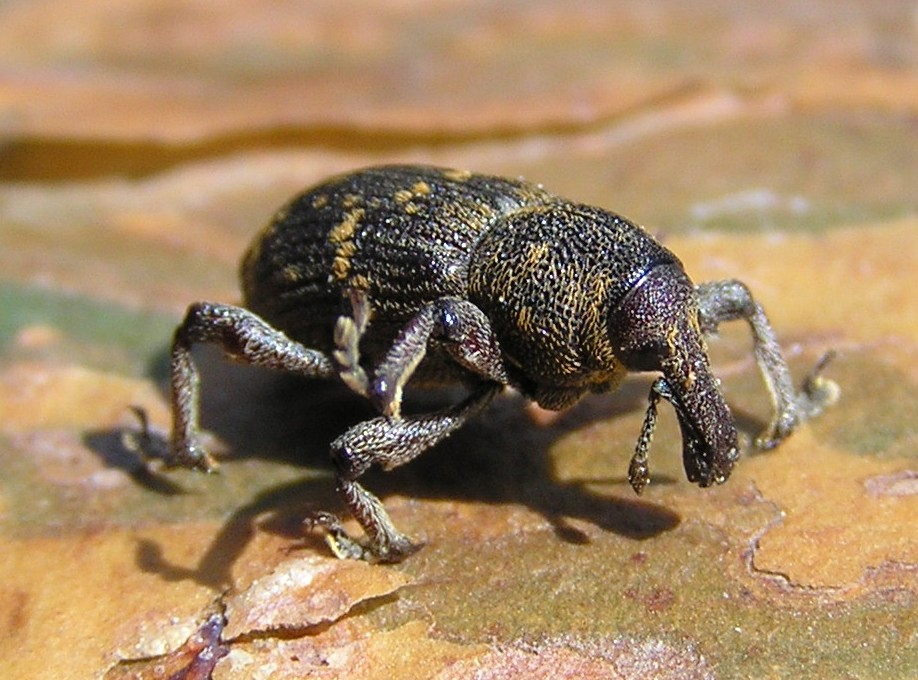
- Hylobius abietis

Scientific classification
- Domain: Eukaryota
- Kingdom: Animalia
- Phylum: Arthropoda
- Class: Insecta
- Order: Coleoptera
- Suborder: Polyphaga
- Infraorder: Cucujiformia
- Family: Curculionidae
- Subfamily: Molytinae
- Tribe: Hylobiini
- Subtribe: Hylobiina
- Genus: Hylobius; Germar, 1817

Species
- See text

= Hylobius =

Genus of beetles

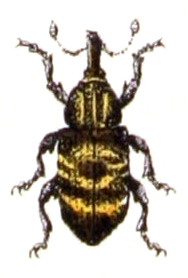
Hylobius abietis

Hylobius is a genus of true weevils (family Curculionidae). Several Hylobius species are major pests of coniferous trees.

== Species ==
Species include:

- Hylobius abietis Linnaeus, 1758 — pine weevil
- Hylobius albosparsus Boheman - big larch weevil
- Hylobius aliradicis Warner, 1966 — southern pine root weevil
- Hylobius alpheus Reiche, 1857
- Hylobius congener Dalla Torre et al., 1943 — seedling debarking weevil
- Hylobius excavatus Laicharting, 1781
- Hylobius graecus Pic, 1902
- Hylobius huguenini Reitter, 1891
- Hylobius pales Herbst, 1797 - pales weevil
- Hylobius piceus (DeGeer)
- Hylobius pinastri Gyllenhaal, 1813 — pine weevil
- Hylobius pinicola Couper, 1864 — Couper collar weevil
- Hylobius radicis Buchanan, 1935 — pine root collar weevil
- Hylobius rhizophagus Benjamin & Walker, 1963 — root tip weevil, Millers
- Hylobius transversovittatus Goeze, 1777 — Goeze root-boring weevil
- Hylobius warreni Wood, 1957 — Warren's collar weevil

== See also ==
- Forest pathology
