= Tula prison break =

Prison escape in Mexico

Coordinates: 20.0603°N 99.3617°W

- Part of the Mexican drug war
Date	1 December 2021
Location	Tula de Allende, Hidalgo, Mexico
Result	Prison break successful: Nine inmates freed; Cartel boss escaped; Mexico promises to recapture inmates

Belligerents
Gangsters; Prisoners	(Mexico) Mexican police

Casualties and losses
	2 injured
- Location within Hidalgo

On 1 December 2021, a gang of armed men broke into a prison in Tula de Allende, Hidalgo state, Mexico.

== Incident ==
At around 4am on 1 December 2021, gangsters arrived at the building, they proceeded to car-ram and then blow up a pair of vehicles, catching the prison guards' attention. Gunshots were fired by the criminals.

Just as local security forces began to react, two more cars exploded, allowing the gang to successfully storm the jail.

== Aftermath ==
Nine inmates were freed, including José Artemio Maldonado Mejía, more well known as "El Michoacano", a local drug lord and head of a Mexican drug cartel, the Pueblos Unidos. The next day, Mexican police managed to recapture three inmates and 8 criminals involved in the prison raid.

Two law enforcement officers, one a policeman and the second a guard, were injured in the attack.

The government of Hidalgo has launched an investigation aiming to track the criminals down. The program is still ongoing.

Car bombs are a rare occurrence in Mexico; the most notable example of their usage occurring in 2010.
