= Hylobius warreni =

Scientific classification
- Domain: Eukaryota
- Kingdom: Animalia
- Phylum: Arthropoda
- Class: Insecta
- Order: Coleoptera
- Suborder: Polyphaga
- Infraorder: Cucujiformia
- Family: Curculionidae
- Genus: Hylobius
- Species: H. warreni

Binomial name
- Hylobius warreni Wood, 1957

Species of beetle

Hylobius warreni, or Warren's rootcollar weevil, is a common pest of spruce and pine throughout Canada. It causes considerable damage to native species of spruce both in natural stands and in plantations (Rose and Lindquist 1985).

== Description ==
Hylobius warreni is 8–11 millimetres (0.31–0.43 in) long, and has a dull black body colour. It is clothed with fine grey scales between the patches of white.

Trees growing in wet ground or in deep layers of humus are most susceptible to attack. Characteristically, tunnels in the root collar region are filled with pitch, with larvae feeding on the cambial or inner bark region. Small trees are often girdled and killed. Feeding damage on larger trees permits wood rots to enter into the wounds, the trees becoming susceptible to wind breakage.
