= Rudolph Hass =

American avocado horticulturist (1892–1952)

- Born: Rudolph Gustav Hass; June 5, 1892; Milwaukee, Wisconsin, U.S.
- Died: October 24, 1952 (aged 60); Fallbrook, California, U.S.
- Occupations: Mail carrier, horticulturist
- Known for: Hass avocado
- Spouse: Elizabeth Schuette (m. 1919)
- Children: 5

Rudolph "Rudie" Gustav Hass (June 5, 1892 – October 24, 1952) was an American mail carrier and horticulturist who first grew the Hass avocado, the source of 95% of California avocados grown commercially today.

== Life before 1925 ==
Rudolph Gustav Hass was born on June 5, 1892, in Milwaukee, Wisconsin, to parents Henry C. Hass (1860–1935) and Alma F. Hass (née Zergman, 1856–1936). Hass quit school after finishing 10th grade at age 15 and went to work.

Hass met Elizabeth Schuette (1899–1997) in 1918 at a 4th of July church picnic. He was involved in a mission working with children on weekends and asked Elizabeth if she could play the piano for his ministry at the mission. She agreed and thus their courtship began. They were married about a year later on February 8, 1919, in Milwaukee, Wisconsin. The family moved to Pasadena, California in 1923.

Hass got a job as a door-to-door salesman in 1923, first selling "Real Silk Hose" (socks and ties for men), then selling Maytag washing machines. In 1925, Hass got a job with the United States Post Office in Pasadena making 25 cents per hour. That was before mail truck routes, so Hass carried the heavy mail sack every day on his route for ten years until he was given a car route due to his failing heart.

== Discovery of the Hass avocado ==
After reading a magazine article illustrating an avocado tree with dollar bills hanging from it in 1925, Hass used all the money he had, plus a loan from his sister, Ida Hass, to buy a small acre and a half avocado grove at 430 West Road La Habra Heights, California. The trees were old Fuerte avocados with 2 or 3 Lyon as well as a few Pueblas and Nabals. The Fuerte was the best avocado available at that time, but Hass could not afford to buy more trees, so he decided to cut down many of the old trees and have them grafted over to Fuerte with new bud wood.

Hass hired a professional grafter named Caulkins, who advised Hass to buy avocado seeds from a nursery owned by A.R. Rideout from Whittier, California and grow his own seedlings and then have them grafted to the Fuerte variety. Hass agreed and followed his advice. He planted the rest of the grove on 12-foot (3.7 m) centers with three seeds in each hole. Cuttings from existing Fuerte trees were grafted onto the strongest of the three newly planted trees from each hole. All but three of the grafts 'took' and new Fuerte trees grew out of the new seedlings. Caulkins re-grafted those three trees. Then he re-grafted the one tree that had rejected the second graft. Again it did not take. Hass was ready to give up and asked Caulkins to chop it down, but Caulkins told him it was a good strong tree and advised Hass to "just leave it alone and see what happens."

The seed that produced the Hass avocado had already been cross pollinated by nature before Rideout sold it, along with a hundred other seeds, to Hass. When that seedling was 14" tall and the trunk only 1/2" thick, it had three walnut size fruit on it. Fuertes rarely produced fruit in less than five years. Hass had his wife Elizabeth take his picture kneeling by the seedling and showing one of the tiny avocados hanging over his hand. This was in July 1926. That picture has been immortalized in a portrait painted by Rudolph Hass's grandson, Thomas Wilkes. That seedling grew more rapidly and produced more fruit than the Fuerte grafts. It also grew straight up and was not as spread out as the Fuerte trees making more trees to the acre possible. When the fruit grew large enough and mature, Hass picked them to ripen. The family agreed that this avocado tasted as good, if not better than the Fuerte.

== Marketing ==
As the tree grew and produced more fruit than the family could use, Hass took some to his co-workers at the Pasadena Post Office. They liked the avocados and asked if they could buy more from him. He agreed to sell them a bag of 4 or 5 avocados for $1. He sold all he brought to work and took orders for more. The Hass family began to work harvesting and selling avocados from a roadside stand by the grove at 430 West Road in La Habra, California.

Hass also contacted the 'Model Grocery Store' on Colorado St. in Pasadena and found it to be a ready market. He left them a few sample avocados and they agreed to sell the fruit and did so for many years. The chefs of wealthy people who lived on South Orange Grove Street shopped there, and once they sampled the Hass variety, they insisted upon it. At $1.00 each, avocados were only available to the rich. A dollar a day was a typical food budget for a family of four or five in those days.

In August 1935, Hass patented his avocado tree (Plant Patent No. 139). Hass signed an agreement with Harold Brokaw, a Whittier nurseryman, to grow and sell the Hass Avocados. Hass was to receive 25% of the proceeds.

However, the patent was widely violated. Growers would buy one tree from Mr. Brokaw who had the exclusive right to produce the nursery trees. They would then re-graft their whole grove with the bud wood from that one tree. For that reason, Rudolph Hass made less than $5,000 in royalties over the life of the patent (at the time, patents had a term of 17 years). However, Rudolph Hass was the first person to have a producing grove of Hass Avocados, though it was a very small grove.

Hass expanded to Fallbrook, planting an 80-acre (320,000 m^{2}) orchard in 1948 which bore its first crop in 1952, just as his 17-year patent expired.

== Marriage and children ==
Hass and Elizabeth Schuette were married on August 2, 1919, in Milwaukee, Wisconsin. They had five children.

== Death and afterwards ==
One month after the patent expired in August 1952, at the age of 60, Hass suffered a heart attack on September 24, 1952. He died a month later of heart failure in the Fallbrook Hospital on October 24, 1952. He was buried at Mountain View Cemetery in Altadena, on his wife's 53rd birthday, October 28, 1952.

His wife Elizabeth lived to the age of 98. She lived in California the rest of her life on the pension from her husband's mailman job.
