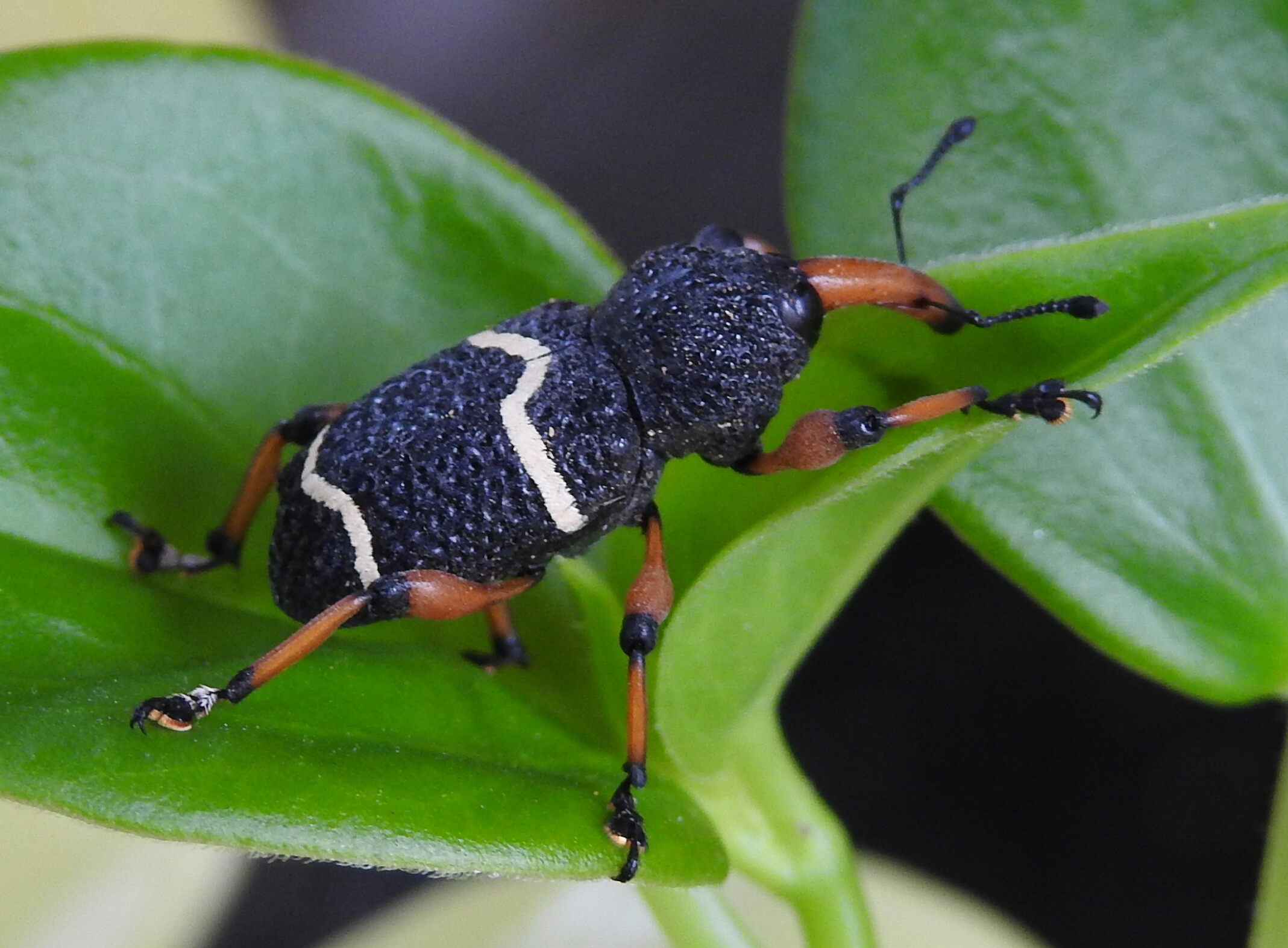
- Heilipodus spp.

Scientific classification
- Domain: Eukaryota
- Kingdom: Animalia
- Phylum: Arthropoda
- Class: Insecta
- Order: Coleoptera
- Suborder: Polyphaga
- Infraorder: Cucujiformia
- Family: Curculionidae
- Subfamily: Molytinae
- Tribe: Hylobiini

Subtribes
- Epistrophina; Hylobiina

= Hylobiini =

Tribe of beetles

Hylobiini is a weevil tribe in the subfamily Molytinae.

== Genera ==
Subtribus: Epistrophina

- Cyriaspis – Epistrophus – Ischiomastus – Lymanchonus – Myrtacebius – Polymicrus – Pseudanchonus – Rhecas – Typacrus

Subtribus: Hylobiina

- Aclees – Arniticus – Byzes – Calvertius – Centor – Coffearhynchus – Dysprosoestus – Eudociminus – Gonzalezanthus – Haplogenus – Heilipodus – Heilipus – Heilus – Hesychobius – Hilipinus – Hylobiites – Hylobius – Imbilius – Iphipus – Kaiella – Kobuzo – Marshallius – Neseilipus – Nothofagius – Ozoctenus – Pachylobius – Pagiophloeus – Parabyzes – Paramecops – Perihylobius – Philophloeus – Pimelocerus – Placeilipus – Plethes – Porohylobius – Pseudaclees – Pseudopagiophloeus – Rhineilipus – Sandrarhyncolus – Scolinus – Sophronobius – Syphorbus – Tartarisus

Subtribus: Incertae sedis

- Achelocis – Bantiades – Demyrsus – Gyrbykana – Howeotranes – Melanotranes – Memes – Miltotranes – Myrmecolixus – Opsittis – Paratranes – Tranes
