= Pueblos Unidos =

Mexican criminal group

Pueblos Unidos is a Mexican criminal group active in the Michoacán region. It began in 2021 as a self-defense group defending the local avocado farmers from cartel gangs Los Viagras and Jalisco New Generation but soon degenerated into a criminal racketeering group itself. It has been suggested that the group is tied to the gang La Resistencia.

One of the group leaders was José Artemio Maldonado, known as “El Michoacano”, one of the biggest fuel thieves in Mexico, involved in the Tula prison break.
