= List of countries by avocado production =

Avocado production

This article lists countries by avocado production from 2020 to 2023, using data provided by the Food and Agriculture Organization Corporate Statistical Database (FAOSTAT). Global avocado production in 2023 was estimated at 10,466,560 metric tonnes, representing an increase of about 9.8% from 9,534,798 tonnes in 2022. Mexico remained the leading producer, contributing over 28% of the global total. Dependent territories are shown in italics.

== Avocado production by country (tonnes) ==
Country/region	2023	2022	2021	2020
Mexico (more)	2,973,344	2,592,581	2,442,945	2,393,849
Colombia	1,085,765	1,090,664	979,618	829,147
Dominican Republic	1,016,834	737,201	634,368	620,087
Peru	982,558	866,457	776,651	672,232
Indonesia	874,046	389,000	526,000	669,000
Kenya	542,278	458,439	416,803	322,556
Brazil	422,545	338,238	300,874	267,059
Haiti	194,896	173,507	170,000	171,984
Vietnam	189,437	210,595	213,007	158,889
Israel	177,001	189,667	165,000	147,000
Chile	168,530	168,010	169,004	161,218
Ethiopia	167,556	167,884	193,400	245,336
China	138,066	135,860	124,780	115,620
Venezuela	131,786	128,611	129,798	128,694
Morocco	118,666	98,720	82,369	69,940
United States	116,890	142,340	136,750	187,433
Australia	115,384	86,171	85,986	77,295
South Africa	108,880	103,602	82,677	84,775
Malawi	94,334	94,096	93,839	93,543
Zimbabwe	91,017	6,169	6,247	5,800
Spain	86,800	105,930	116,770	99,070
Cameroon	77,390	74,325	74,480	74,393
DR Congo	61,726	62,035	62,150	62,310
Angola	58,231	55,119	53,271	52,488
Guatemala	51,902	138,964	135,671	132,909
New Zealand	42,695	42,346	38,282	37,537
Turkey	38,462	40,181	9,081	5,923
Ivory Coast	37,350	36,648	36,775	36,697
Portugal	33,580	25,790	20,170	16,560
Madagascar	27,543	27,352	27,197	27,044
Ecuador	26,523	26,440	42,492	20,352
Lebanon	20,306	19,408	18,955	18,748
Philippines	18,884	20,076	19,875	20,055
El Salvador	17,349	43,757	38,568	28,559
Greece	15,950	13,890	12,760	9,570
Paraguay	15,701	15,329	15,256	15,357
Costa Rica	15,387	12,378	12,997	13,286
Bolivia	12,629	12,514	12,443	12,477
Sri Lanka	12,238	14,245	14,941	19,274
Panama	11,263	10,297	10,593	13,000
Republic of the Congo	9,486	9,506	9,588	9,497
Ghana	9,427	9,288	9,269	9,327
Central African Republic	8,876	8,148	8,115	8,074
Rwanda	6,766	5,838	5,950	6,477
Vanuatu	5,600	5,606	–	–
East Timor	4,401	4,334	4,345	4,335
Argentina	4,117	4,150	4,131	4,113
Palestine	3,658	3,151	3,498	1,520
Cuba	3,536	3,540	3,531	3,537
Jamaica	2,365	2,400	2,414	2,385
Honduras	2,160	2,199	2,183	2,099
Grenada	1,551	1,552	1,553	1,553
Samoa	1,440	1,408	1,414	1,410
Bahamas	1,434	1,403	1,409	1,405
France	1,210	1,080	1,100	1,080
Cyprus	1,180	1,370	1,210	1,163
Dominica	1,079	1,081	1.070	1,060
Puerto Rico	1,063	311	346	429
Bosnia and Herzegovina	1,037	1,037	1,037	1,038
Egypt	903	894	1,050	–
Eswatini	887	874	877	875
Barbados	510	755	753	760
Guyana	423	1,188	2,123	9,016
Malaysia	402	458	269	210
Tunisia	336	331	332	331
Saint Lucia	246	340	304	265
Fiji	211	263	251	160
Bhutan	192	136	73	112
French Polynesia	135	115	115	115
Suriname	98	99	100	111
Trinidad and Tobago	51	53	55	56
Cook Islands	21	21	21	21
Seychelles	12	13	13	13
