= Hylobius pales =

Scientific classification
- Kingdom: Animalia
- Phylum: Arthropoda
- Clade: Pancrustacea
- Class: Insecta
- Order: Coleoptera
- Suborder: Polyphaga
- Infraorder: Cucujiformia
- Family: Curculionidae
- Genus: Hylobius
- Species: H. pales

Binomial name
- Hylobius pales (Herbst, 1797)

Synonyms
- Pissodes macellus Germar, 1824

Species of beetle

Hylobius pales, the pales weevil, is a species of beetle belonging to the family of true weevils, Curculionidae. It is found in North America, and is a significant pest of coniferous trees.

== Description ==
H. pales adults are dark red-brown in colour, punctuated with tufts of yellowish or gray hairs on the elytra and thorax. Being nearly as long as the weevil's thorax, its characteristic rostrum is robust, cylindrical, and gently curved, The antennae of the pales weevil are located before the middle of its snout, and not far from the sides of the mouth. Individuals can range from 5.8mm to 11.3mm in length

== Distribution ==
H. pales are distributed throughout most of the eastern half of the United States, Puerto Rico, and Canada, coinciding with the range of conifers in which they inhabit.

== Life cycle ==
Adult pales weevils oviposit their eggs within the stumps and roots of a suitable host plant, typically being species of pine trees. The larvae tunnel and feed upon the tree's vascular tissues until they pupate, occurring after the larva's fifth or sixth instar. Fully developed weevils then emerge out through the bark.

Southern populations of H. pales may have two or more generations per year, while weevils in more northern latitudes usually have only one generation, with some adults overwintering for two years.

== Ecological impact ==
H. pales are attracted to the scent of volatile compounds which emanate from distressed and dying trees. Damage to the host may occur either physically, during the feeding and tunneling of adults and larvae, or through the transmission of fungal pathogens, leading to disease development within the host plant.

Tree seedlings in particular are vulnerable to infestation, resulting in substantial growth reductions and trunk deformation during the early stages of plant development. Without intervention, mortality rates as a result of H. pales invasions can reach 30 to 60 per cent.
