= Heilipus apiatus =

Scientific classification
- Domain: Eukaryota
- Kingdom: Animalia
- Phylum: Arthropoda
- Class: Insecta
- Order: Coleoptera
- Suborder: Polyphaga
- Infraorder: Cucujiformia
- Family: Curculionidae
- Genus: Heilipus
- Species: H. apiatus

Binomial name
- Heilipus apiatus (Olivier, 1807)

Synonyms
- Pissodes squamosus LeConte, 1824

Species of beetle

Heilipus apiatus, commonly known as the avocado weevil, is a species of beetle in the family Curculionidae. It is native to North America.
