= Hass avocado =

Avocado cultivar

Persea americana 'Hass'
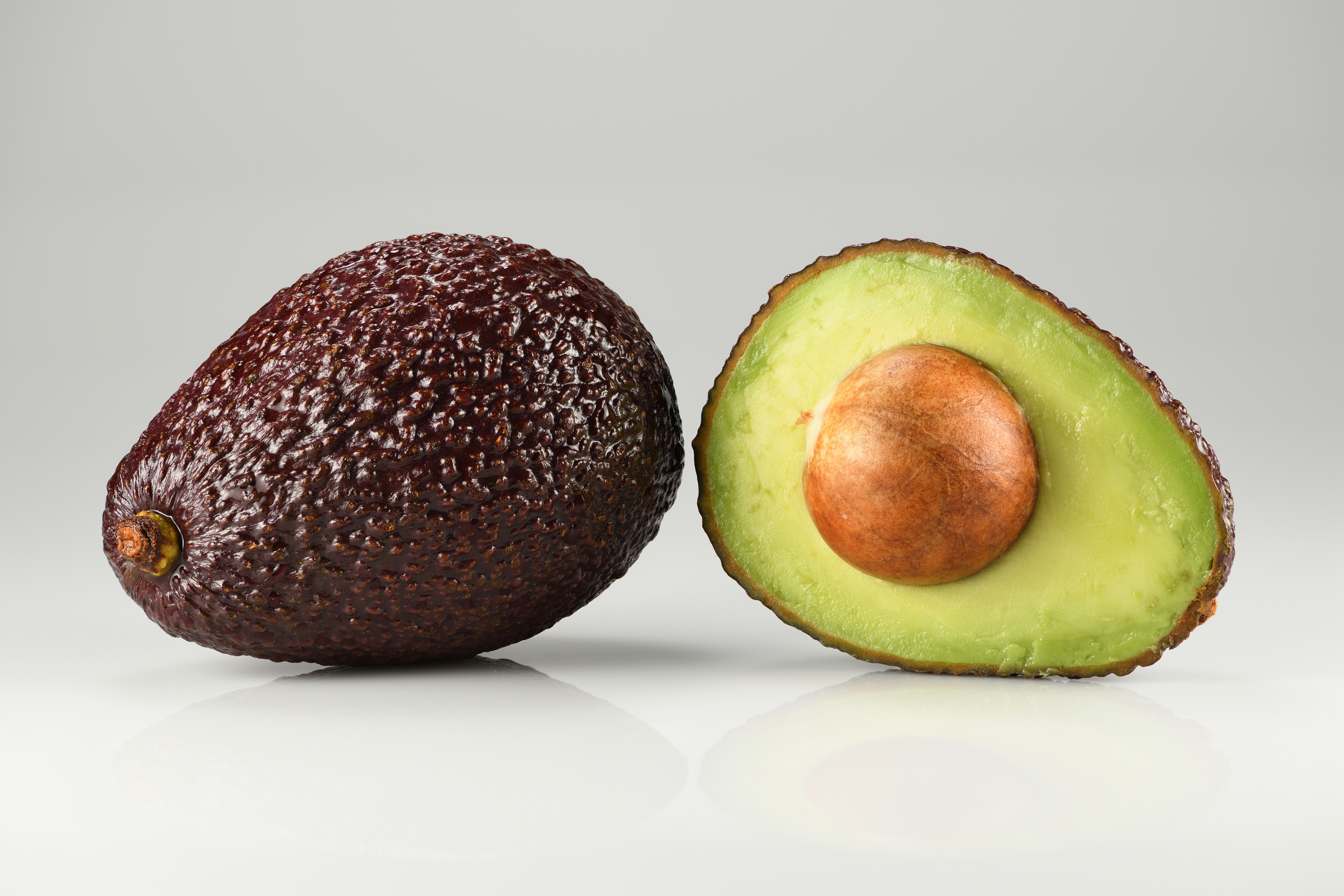
- Genus: Persea
- Species: Persea americana
- Cultivar: 'Hass'
- Breeder: Rudolph Hass
- Origin: First grown at La Habra Heights, California in 1926; patented 1935 in the US, Plant Patent No. 139

The Hass avocado is a variety of avocado with dark green, bumpy skin. It was first grown and sold by Southern California mail carrier and amateur horticulturist Rudolph Hass, who also gave it his name.

The Hass avocado is a large-sized fruit weighing 200 to 300 grams (7 to 10 oz). When ripe, the skin becomes a dark purplish-black and yields to gentle pressure. When ripe, the flesh is pale green near the skin and becomes a deeper yellow-green towards the center.

Owing to its shelf-life, high growing yield and, in some areas, year-round harvesting, the Hass cultivar is the most consumed avocado worldwide. In the United States, it accounts for more than 80% of the avocado crop and 95% of the California crop, and is the most widely grown avocado in New Zealand.

== History ==
All commercial, fruit-bearing Hass avocado trees have been grown from grafted seedlings propagated from a single tree that was grown from a seed bought by Rudolph Hass in 1926 from A. R. Rideout of Whittier, California. At the time, Rideout was getting seeds from any source he could find, even restaurant food scraps. The cultivar this seed came from is not known. In 2019, the National Academy of Sciences published a genetic study concluding that the Hass avocado is a cross between Mexican (61%) and Guatemalan (39%) avocado varieties.

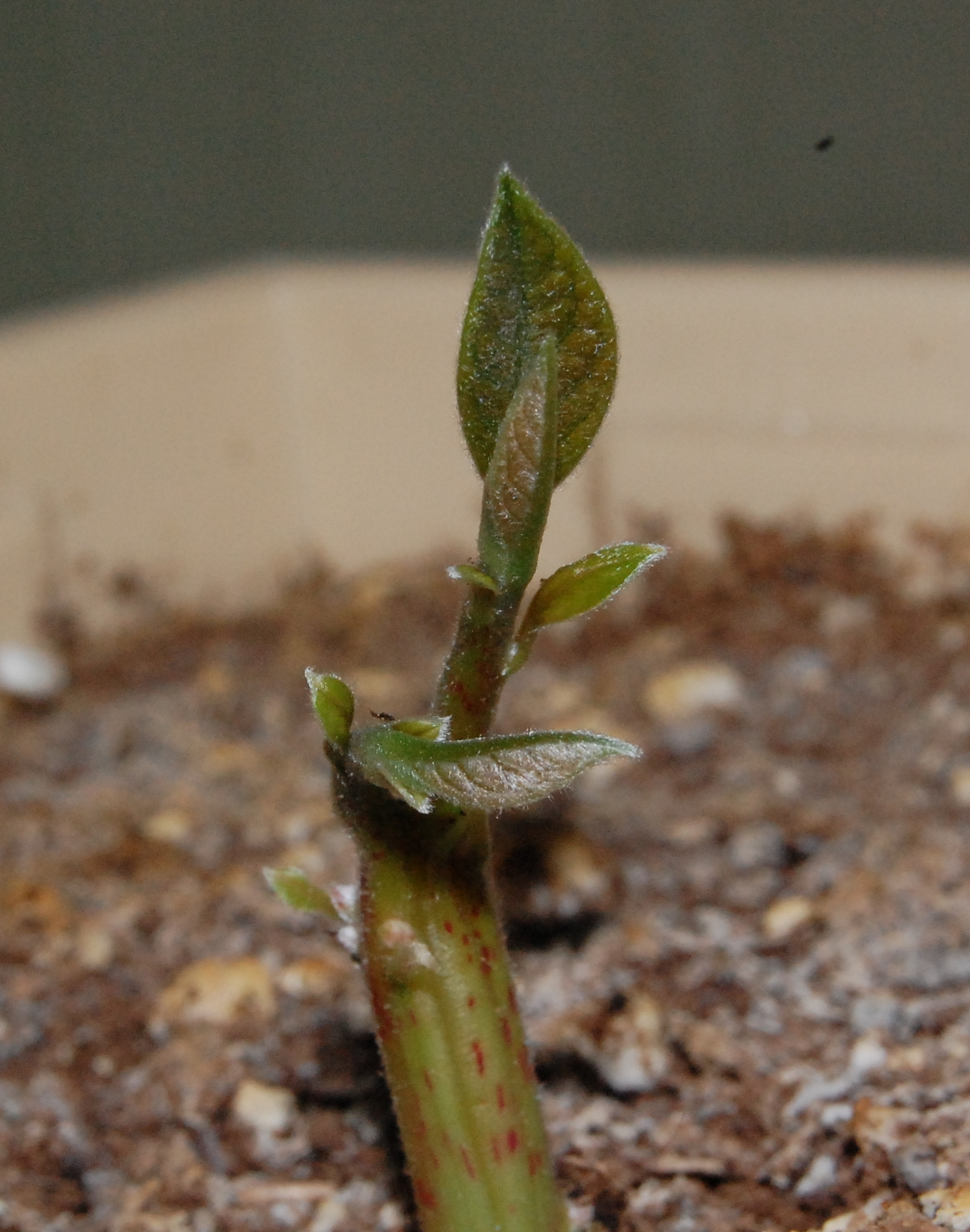
A young Hass avocado sprout

In 1926, at his 1.5-acre grove at 430 West Road, La Habra Heights, California, Hass planted three seeds he had bought from Rideout, which yielded one strong seedling. After trying and failing at least twice to graft the seedling with branches from Fuerte avocado trees (the leading commercial cultivar at the time), Hass thought of cutting it down but a professional grafter named Caulkins told him the young tree was sound and strong, so he let it be. When the tree began bearing odd, bumpy fruit, his children liked the taste. As the tree's yields grew bigger, Hass easily sold what his family did not eat to co-workers at the post office. The Hass avocado had one of its first commercial successes at the Model Grocery Store on Colorado Street in Pasadena, California, where chefs working for some of the town's wealthy residents bought the new cultivar's big, nutty-tasting fruit for $1 each, a very high price at the time (equivalent to $18 in 2025).

Hass patented the tree in 1935 and made a contract with Whittier nurseryman Harold Brokaw to grow and sell grafted seedlings propagated from its cuttings, with Brokaw getting 75% of the proceeds. Brokaw then specialized in the Hass and often sold out of grafted seedlings since, unlike the Fuerte, Hass yields are year-round and also more plentiful, with bigger fruit, a longer shelf life, and richer flavor owing to higher oil content.

By the early 21st century, the US avocado industry took in over $1 billion a year from the heavy-bearing, high quality Hass cultivar, which accounted for around 80% of all avocados grown worldwide.

The name "Hass" (rhymes with "pass") is sometimes confused with the name "Haas" in the United States due to the habit of some supermarkets using that spelling in the produce department to advertise the fruit.

=== The mother tree ===
Owing to later suburban sprawl in Southern California, the mother tree stood for many years in front of a residence in La Habra Heights. The tree died when it was 76 years old and was cut down on 11 September 2002 after a ten-year fight with phytophthora (root rot), which often kills avocado trees. The wood was stored in a tree nursery to await an historic emblem, as of 2008.

Hass avocado, raw, peeled
Nutritional value per 100 g (3.5 oz)
- Energy: 206 kcal (860 kJ)
- Carbohydrates: 8.3 g
- Fat: 20.3 g
- Protein: 1.8 g
Vitamins and minerals
Vitamins	Quantity %DV^{†}
Vitamin B6	15% 0.257 mg
Folate (B9)	32% 129 μg
Vitamin C	3% 3 mg
Minerals	Quantity %DV^{†}
Calcium	1% 14 mg
Copper	32% 0.285 mg
Iron	3% 0.61 mg
Magnesium	8% 32.8 mg
Manganese	9% 0.197 mg
Phosphorus	3% 42 mg
Potassium	19% 576 mg
Sodium	0% 2.4 mg
Zinc	4% 0.46 mg
- Other constituents: Quantity
- Water: 67 g
- Link to USDA FoodData Central entry
- ^{†}Percentages estimated using US recommendations for adults, except for potassium, which is estimated based on expert recommendation from the National Academies.

== Bearing pattern ==
Hass avocado trees, like some other cultivars, may only bear well every other year. After a year with low yield, often because of cold, for which the tree does not have much tolerance, yields may be very high the next year. However, the heavy crop can deplete stored carbohydrates, lowering the following season's yield and this can set the tree into a lifelong alternate bearing pattern. Southern California Hass Avocado groves have good soil and drainage, plentiful sunlight and cool gentle winds from the oceans which help the fruit grow. These conditions hold throughout the year, so there are always fresh harvests of Hass avocados in Southern California.

== Nutritional value ==
A raw, peeled Hass avocado is 67% water, 20% fat, 8% carbohydrates, and 2% protein (table). In a reference amount of 100 g (3.5 oz), a Hass avocado supplies 206 calories of food energy, and is a rich source (20% or higher of the Daily Value, DV) of folate and copper, with moderate content of vitamin B6 and potassium ( 15-19% DV, table).

Hass avocados contain phytosterols and carotenoids, including lutein and zeaxanthin.
