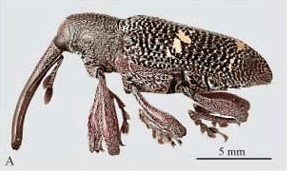
- Heilipus lauri

Scientific classification
- Kingdom: Animalia
- Phylum: Arthropoda
- Class: Insecta
- Order: Coleoptera
- Suborder: Polyphaga
- Infraorder: Cucujiformia
- Family: Curculionidae
- Tribe: Hylobiini
- Genus: Heilipus; Germar, 1824

Diversity
- at least 280 species

= Heilipus =

Genus of beetles

Heilipus is a genus of pine weevils in the beetle family Curculionidae. There are more than 280 described species in Heilipus.

== See also ==
- List of Heilipus species
