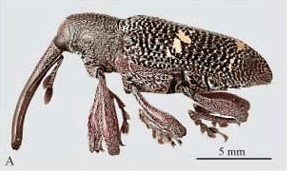

Scientific classification
- Kingdom: Animalia
- Phylum: Arthropoda
- Clade: Pancrustacea
- Class: Insecta
- Order: Coleoptera
- Suborder: Polyphaga
- Infraorder: Cucujiformia
- Superfamily: Curculionoidea
- Family: Curculionidae
- Genus: Heilipus
- Species: H. lauri

Binomial name
- Heilipus lauri (Boheman, 1845)

= Heilipus lauri =

Species of beetle

Heilipus lauri, the avocado seed weevil, is a species of weevil that is native to Mexico. It has become an invasive pest in Colombia.

== Range ==
=== Native range ===
It is native to Mexico and Central America.

=== Introduced range ===
H. lauri are an invasive agricultural pest in Colombia, where they feed on avocado fruit. In 1914, the Animal and Plant Health Inspection Service agency of the United States Department of Agriculture banned the import of avocados from Mexico after detecting the avocado seed weevil.

== Biology ==
They bore perforations or holes into avocado fruit and lay their eggs in them. Female weevils lay, on average, 2 eggs per oviposition chamber. Once a female lays her eggs in a chamber, other females may add their eggs to it. When the larvae hatch, they bore through the fruit to reach the seed on which they feed. Adult weevils feed on the various parts of avocado plants, and they live, on average, 203 days. They tend to be most active during the day.
