= Fuerte avocado =

Variety of avocado

Persea americana 'Fuerte'
- New Zealand-grown fuerte avocados
- Genus: Persea
- Species: Persea americana
- Cultivar: 'Fuerte'
- Origin: First grown in Atlixco, Mexico in the garden of Alejandro Le Blanc; commercialized in the United States from 1911.

The Fuerte avocado is the second most popular commercial variety of avocado in the world, after Hass.

Brought from Mexico to the United States in 1911, Fuerte quickly became the dominant commercial avocado variety in the United States. Its commercial dominance lasted into the 1950s, when it was surpassed by Hass.

Prized for its rich, nutty flavor, Fuerte avocados are 8 to 16 oz (226 to 452g) in size, with relatively smooth green skin. When ripe, the skin peels easily revealing a greenish-yellow flesh. Fuerte is considered by many growers and consumers to be the best-tasting commercial variety of avocado.

== History ==
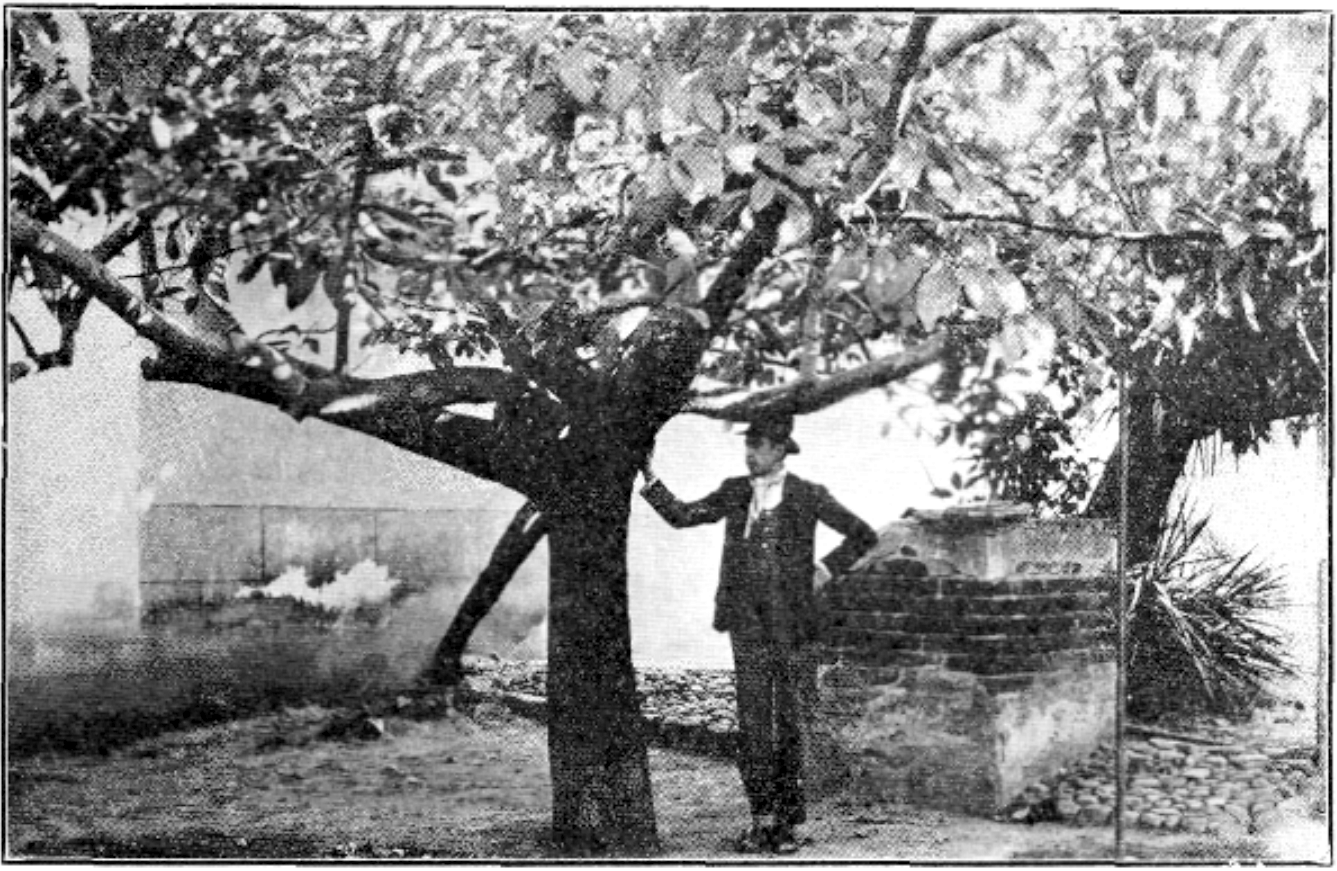
The parent tree of the Fuerte avocado [1918] stands in the garden of Alejandro Le Blanc in Atlixco.

The Fuerte avocado "parent tree" grew in the garden of Alejandro Le Blanc in Atlixco, Mexico. In 1911 cuttings from the tree were sent by Carl B. Schmidt to California where it was commercialized by West India Gardens of Altadena, CA.

In 1913 the variety earned the name "Fuerte" (meaning "strong" in Spanish) when several young trees at West India Gardens survived an unusually long bout of freezing temperatures in the area.

The first Fuerte avocado orchard in the United States was planted by J. T. Whedon on property in Yorba Linda.
