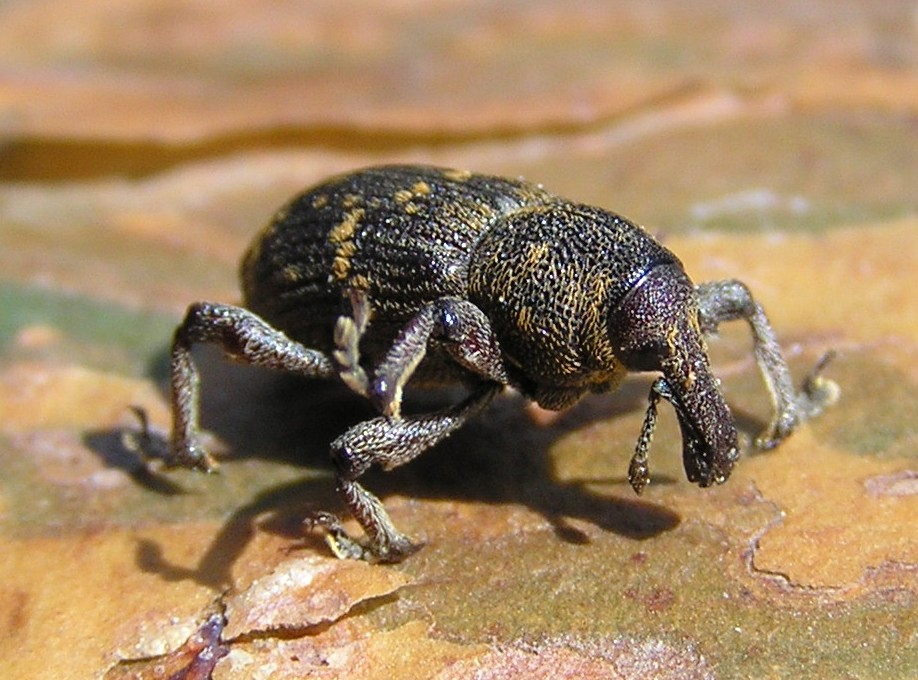
- Hylobius abietis

Scientific classification
- Kingdom: Animalia
- Phylum: Arthropoda
- Clade: Pancrustacea
- Class: Insecta
- Order: Coleoptera
- Suborder: Polyphaga
- Infraorder: Cucujiformia
- Superfamily: Curculionoidea
- Family: Curculionidae
- Genus: Hylobius
- Species: H. abietis

Binomial name
- Hylobius abietis (Linnaeus, 1758)

= Hylobius abietis =

Species of beetle

Hylobius abietis or the large pine weevil is a beetle belonging to family Curculionidae. This species is widely regarded as the most important pest of most commercially important coniferous trees in European plantations. Seedlings planted or arising from natural regeneration (germinated seed-fall) after clear felling operations are especially at risk. The adult weevils cause damage by eating the bark of seedlings around the 'collar' of the stem, thus 'ring-barking' the tree seedling which usually results in its demise.

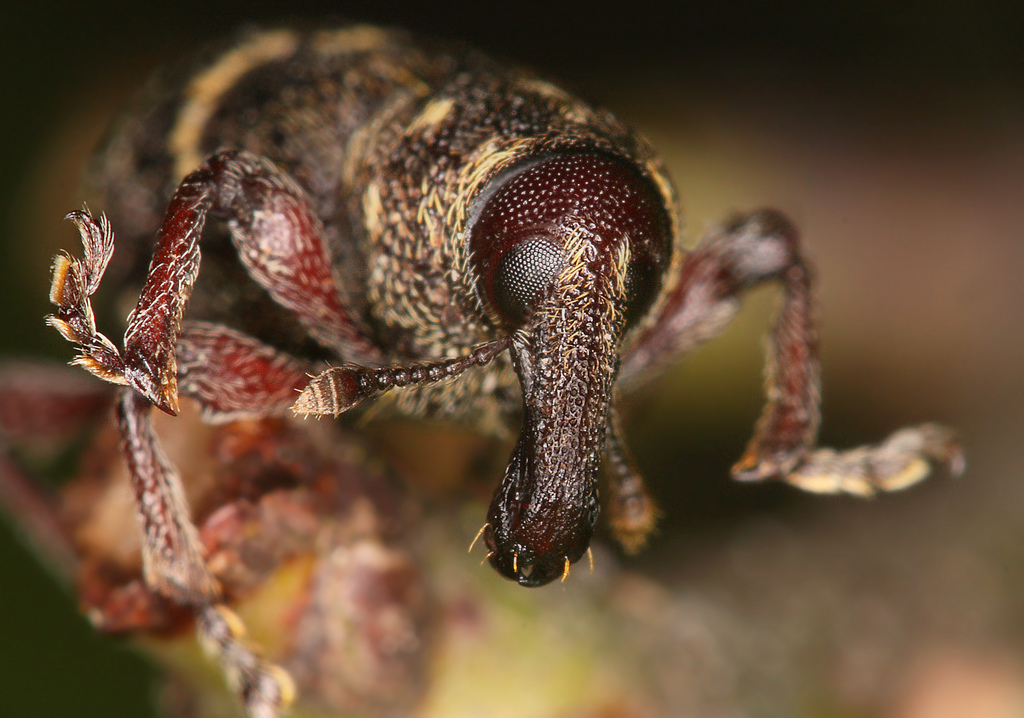

== Description ==
The adult weevils are approximately 10–13 mm (0.39–0.51 in) in length (without beak/snout) and are dark brown with patches of yellow or light brown hairs arranged in irregular rows on their elytra. The legs are black or deep red with a distinctive tooth on the femora and at the end of tibiae. The full grown larvae are 14–16 mm (0.55–0.63 in), typical for weevils, apodial, curved and are whitish, with brown head.

== Behaviour ==
Adults can be found all year long although they usually hibernate during the cold winter months. New adults ready to reproduce are attracted to freshly cut stumps of conifers. Eggs are deposited singly (one or two per day) under the ground into stumps, thick roots or in the soil in their vicinity. Large pine weevils can locate spots on the ground to dig into in a great precision using olfactory cues. Mating also usually takes place in the soil. To get to maturity, adults feed on the bark and phloem of seedlings and young conifers, but sometimes also deciduous trees, causing severe growth loss, stem deformities and increased mortality. Thus, in the years following the clearing of plots and planting of new seedlings, adults that hatch in large numbers may cause a plague.

The large pine weevils have a tendency to attack artificially fertilized trees, especially those fertilized with phosphorus which causes greater nutritional quality of phloem for the weevils or make faster more attractive plants for the weevils due to faster growing.

== Life cycle ==
In the spring, after hibernation, in the ground in the forest litter, females lay eggs on, in, or near the roots of sick, or freshly felled trees. A female can lay up to 100 eggs in her life. The larvae hatch after 2 or 3 weeks, and feed under the bark, excavating galleries and complete development, ending with pupation case, leaving the entrance blocked by sawdust. The pupae are immobile, cream in colour and soft bodied. This phase lasts 2 or 3 weeks, after which the insect leaves the chamber as an adult. With favorable weather the entire development lasts four to five months. The oviposition takes place in April or May, so the weevils emerge in August or September, but are not sexually active until after the winter. The imago lives from two to three years, during which it reproduce in following seasons. In colder seasons the larval development is longer and then the whole cycle lasts twelve months, resulting that imagos able to reproduce quickly. Biennial generation it is also common, by which the larvae hatch from eggs laid in May, live through the whole season overwinter and the imago appears in July or August next year.

== Damage ==
The main damage is caused by the adults that feed on the bark and the cambium. The imago eats throughout the growing season, but the especially intensive attacks are observed April–May (spring attack) and from August to September (autumn attack). Clear cuttings, if not followed by burning or removing of the thick branches and stumps favor the spread of the pest.

== Control ==
Insecticides (mainly seedling dressing) provide the mainly used method of protection transplant from H. abietis feeding damage. Now other methods are being considered, like the use of natural parasites. Physical barriers of seedlings are also used in some of the European countries.

=== Trapping-out and population suppression ===
For more than 100 years, different ways of suppressing the weevil population have been tried, generally with poor results. Some of these techniques are still useful either as tools to monitor weevil populations. Debarking of stumps was also practiced as a weevil suppression technique, but is now abandoned as laborious and inefficient.

=== Silvicultural countermeasures ===
The pine weevil problem is very much related to the practice of clear-felling and planting. Evidence demonstrates that pine weevil problems are less significant within areas of natural regeneration when compared to plantations. Resultantly, natural regeneration is an effective strategy to avoid Hylobius damage, but older or dying spruce stands are often unstable and so frequently the practice of natural regeneration is seen as overly risky due to its necessary inclusion of natural degeneration.

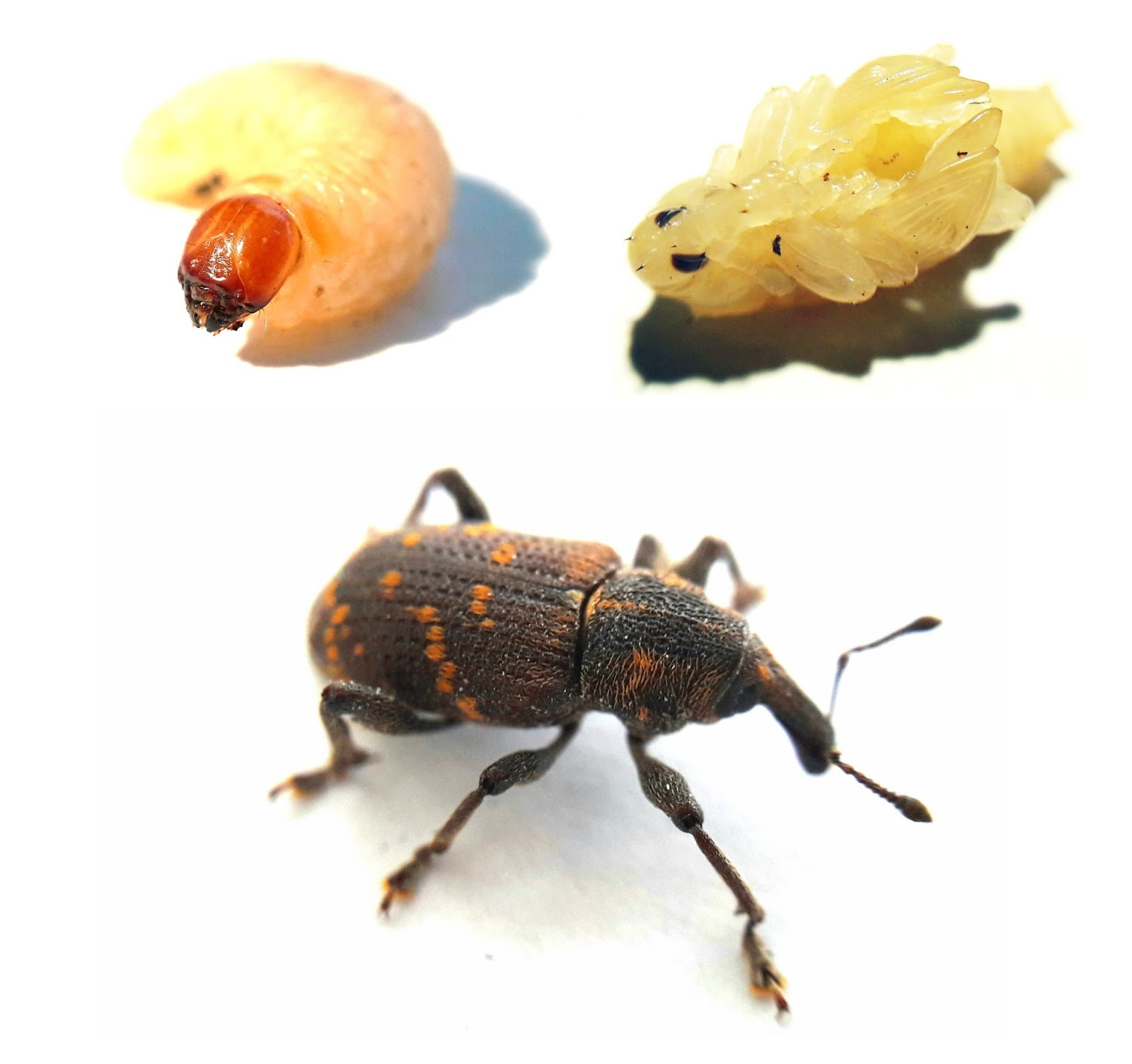
Developmental stages of the large pine weevil

=== Biological control ===
Various natural enemies attack immature and adult pine weevils in the wild. Natural enemies include predatory beetles, insect killing fungi, microscopic insect killing worms (entomopathogenic nematodes) and a parasitic wasp, Bracon hylobii. Ground beetles, nematodes and fungi can kill both immature and adult weevils. The parasitic wasp attacks pine weevil larvae only. Fungus Tarichium hylobii (from the order Entomophthorales order) is a pathogen of Hylobius abietis, especially in the Czech Republic.

Entomopathogenic nematodes are microscopic worms that kill only insects. Nematodes of the families Steinernematidae and Heterorhabditidae are used as biological insecticides against a number of soils inhabiting insect pest. Laboratory and field research has demonstrated that the larval, pupal and adult stages of H. abietis are susceptible to these nematodes. In contrast, the parasitic wasp B. Hylobii, kills only the larval stage of H. abietis. The life cycles of entomopathogenic nematodes and B. hylobii are well adapted to their host and both are capable of locating, infecting and killing H. abietis in the concealed environment of the tree stump. (The potential for biological control to reduce Hylobius abietis damage, by Julia Brixey) In 1994 was treated in Asturias (Spain), because of great attack, with Metoxicloro 1% in 20 ha affected. The result was quite good, but the problem was not totally solved.

== Other sources ==
- Beetles in Colour, Leif Lyneborg (1976, Translated from Danish 1977) ISBN 0-7137-0827-1
- Guide to the Insects of Britain and Western Europe, Michael Chinery (1986, reprinted 1991) ISBN 0-00-219137-7
