= C20H30O2 =

The molecular formula C_{20}H_{30}O_{2} (molar mass : 302.45 g/mol, exact mass : 302.22458) may refer to:

- Abietic acid, a resin acid
- BNN-20, a steroid
- Bosseopentaenoic acid, a conjugated polyunsaturated fatty acid
- Communic acid, a diterpenoid
- Dimethandrolone, an anabolic steroid
- Eicosapentaenoic acid, an omega-3 fatty acid
- Hexahydrocannabutol
- Isopimaric acid, a resin acid
- Levopimaric acid, a resin acid
- Metenolone, an anabolic steroid
- Methyl-1-testosterone, an anabolic steroid
- Methyltestosterone, an anabolic steroid
- 18-Methyltestosterone, an anabolic steroid
- Metogest, a steroidal antiandrogen
- Mibolerone, an anabolic steroid
- Norethandrolone, an anabolic steroid
- Neoabietic acid
- Oxendolone, a steroidal antiandrogen
- Oxogestone
- Sandaracopimaric acid
- Secodehydroabietic acid
- Palustric acid
- Pimaric acid, a resin acid
- Stenbolone, an anabolic steroid
