= Neoabietic acid =

Names
- IUPAC name (1R,4aR,4bS,10aR)-1,4a-dimethyl-7-propan-2-ylidene-3,4,4b,5,6,9,10,10a-octahydro-2H-phenanthrene-1-carboxylic acid
- Other names: neo-abietic acid; 1-Phenanthrenecarboxylic acid

Identifiers
CAS Number	471-77-2
3D model (JSmol)	Interactive image
ChEBI	CHEBI:29653
ChemSpider	191824
ECHA InfoCard	100.162.824
EC Number	634-885-5
KEGG	C11889
PubChem CID	221118
UNII	8I5YI4CXJ7
CompTox Dashboard (EPA)	DTXSID8022038
- InChI: InChI=1S/C20H30O2/c1-13(2)14-6-8-16-15(12-14)7-9-17-19(16,3)10-5-11-20(17,4)18(21)22/h12,16-17H,5-11H2,1-4H3,(H,21,22)/t16-,17+,19+,20+/m0/s1 Key: KGMSWPSAVZAMKR-ONCXSQPRSA-N
- SMILES: CC(=C1CCC2C(=C1)CCC3C2(CCCC3(C)C(=O)O)C)C

Properties
Chemical formula	C_{20}H_{30}O_{2}
Molar mass	302.458 g·mol^{−1}
Appearance	yellow crystalline solid
Density	1.1 g/cm^{3}
Melting point	165–170 °C (329–338 °F; 438–443 K)
Boiling point	433.4 °C (812.1 °F; 706.5 K)
Solubility in water	Sparingly soluble
Solubility	Readily soluble in organic solvents such as ethanol, acetone, and hydrocarbons

Hazards
Flash point	206 °C
- Except where otherwise noted, data are given for materials in their standard state (at 25 °C [77 °F], 100 kPa). Infobox references

Neoabietic acid is a naturally occurring organic compound classified as a diterpenoid with the molecular formula C_{20}H_{30}O_{2}. This is a diterpenoid resin acid found in conifer resins, particularly in processed pine rosin. Neoabietic acid is a structural isomer of abietic acid and belongs to the abietane-type diterpene family. The compound forms primarily through thermal or chemical isomerization of abietic acid during the distillation and processing of crude rosin.

== Physical properties ==
Like other resin acids, neoabietic acid is a colorless to pale yellow crystalline solid at room temperature, sparingly soluble in water but readily soluble in organic solvents such as ethanol, acetone, and hydrocarbons. Neoabietic acid exhibits typical carboxylic acid reactivity, forming salts (rosin soaps) and esters used in industrial applications.

== Natural occurrence ==
The acid is found in such taxons as Pinus ponderosa, Pinus resinosa, Pinus nigra, Larix kaempferi, Pinus strobus, Pinus ajanensis, among others.

== Structure ==
Neoabietic acid shares the same molecular formula with abietic acid but differs in the position of its double bonds and the conformation of its tricyclic ring system. Specifically, neoabietic acid features an isopropyl group at position C-13 and a conjugated diene system within its decalin core, distinguishing it from the isolated double bond arrangement in abietic acid.

== Uses ==
The acid has been shown to have potent inhibitory activity against pimaricin, levopimaric acid, and dehydroabietic acid. Neoabietic acid is used as a component in a film-forming polymer.
