= Communic acid =

Labdane-type diterpenoid resin acid found in conifers

Names
- IUPAC name (1S,4aR,5S,8aR)-1,4a-Dimethyl-6-methylidene-5-(3-methylpenta-2,4-dienyl)-3,4,5,7,8,8a-hexahydro-2H-naphthalene-1-carboxylic acid

Identifiers
CAS Number	2761-77-5
3D model (JSmol)	Interactive image
ChemSpider	57576709
PubChem CID	121225492
CompTox Dashboard (EPA)	DTXSID301317724
- InChI: InChI=1S/C20H30O2/c1-6-14(2)8-10-16-15(3)9-11-17-19(16,4)12-7-13-20(17,5)18(21)22/h6,8,16-17H,1,3,7,9-13H2,2,4-5H3,(H,21,22)/t16-,17+,19+,20-/m0/s1 Key: YGBZFOQXPOGACY-CUDHKJQZSA-N
- SMILES: CC(=CC[C@H]1C(=C)CC[C@@H]2[C@@]1(CCC[C@]2(C)C(=O)O)C)C=C

Properties
Chemical formula	C_{20}H_{30}O_{2}
Molar mass	302.458 g·mol^{−1}
- Except where otherwise noted, data are given for materials in their standard state (at 25 °C [77 °F], 100 kPa). Infobox references

Communic acid is a naturally occurring labdane-type diterpenoid resin acid, commonly present in the resins of several coniferous trees, particularly species of Juniperus and other Cupressaceae species.

It has a molecular weight of 302.5 g/mol, and has been studied for its various biological activities, including antimicrobial, antibacterial and antitumor effects, and its use as a synthetic building block for other compounds.

== Chemistry and occurrence ==
Communic acid belongs to the labdane family of diterpenes and possesses a carboxylic acid functional group. It occurs mainly as two geometric isomers: the trans (E) and cis (Z) forms, which differ in the configuration of the double bond at C-13–C-14. Its molecular formula is C_{20}H_{32}O_{2}, and it features a bicyclic skeleton typical of labdane diterpenes.

As a compound, it has been isolated from the resins of the conifer species, Juniperus communis and Austrocedrus chilensis. These resin acids have a defending role in the plants, keeping away the herbivores and microbes.

Recently, (+)-communic acid was isolated from the branches of Platycladus orientalis. This acid seems to exhibit protective effects against UVB-induced skin aging.

== Biological activity ==
Communic acid itself has exhibited some antimicrobial, anti-inflammatory and antioxidant activities in recent studies. Also, communic acid can serve as a chiral building block (whoch is called chiron) for the synthesis of some complex natural products.

== See also ==
- Labdane
- Resin acid
- Abietic acid
- Juniperus communis
