= Sandaracopimaric acid =

Names
- IUPAC name (1R,4aR,4bS,7R,10aR)-7-ethenyl-1,4a,7-trimethyl-3,4,4b,5,6,9,10,10a-octahydro-2H-phenanthrene-1-carboxylic acid
- Other names: (-)-sandaracopimaric acid; Isodextropimaric acid; Pimaradienoic acid; (ent)-pimara-8(14),15-dien-19-oic acid; sandaracopimarate

Identifiers
CAS Number	471-74-9
3D model (JSmol)	Interactive image
ChEBI	CHEBI:69240
ChEMBL	ChEMBLCHEMBL513197
ChemSpider	192262
PubChem CID	221580
UNII	P4BJH0IA3Z
CompTox Dashboard (EPA)	DTXSID80893311
- InChI: InChI=1S/C20H30O2/c1-5-18(2)12-9-15-14(13-18)7-8-16-19(15,3)10-6-11-20(16,4)17(21)22/h5,13,15-16H,1,6-12H2,2-4H3,(H,21,22)/t15-,16+,18-,19+,20+/m0/s1 Key: MHVJRKBZMUDEEV-KRFUXDQASA-N
- SMILES: CC1(CCC2C(=C1)CCC3C2(CCCC3(C)C(=O)O)C)C=C

Properties
Chemical formula	C_{20}H_{30}O_{2}
Molar mass	302.458 g·mol^{−1}
Appearance	solid
Density	1.05 g/cm^{3}
Melting point	248 °C
Boiling point	413.2 °C
Solubility in water	poorly soluble

Hazards
Flash point	198.7±23.4 °C
- Except where otherwise noted, data are given for materials in their standard state (at 25 °C [77 °F], 100 kPa). Infobox references

Sandaracopimaric acid is a naturally occurring diterpenoid, a class of tricyclic organic compounds derived from plant resins. It is characterized by its role as a plant metabolite and exhibits potential anti-inflammatory properties.

== Structure ==
Sandaracopimaric acid features a carboxylic acid group at the position 1 and a vinyl group at the position 7 on a phenanthrene backbone. The compound is a member of the pimaric acids group and also the larger group of resin acids.

The acid is an isomer of 4-epi-sandaracopimaric acid, pimaric acid, continentalic acid, and some other acids. The compound is chiral, with the levorotatory form ((-)-sandaracopimaric acid) being the predominant natural enantiomer.

== Synthesis ==
The structure was identified in 1960 by O. E. Edwards. The total synthesis of the natural enantiomer was achieved in 1968 by A. Afonso et al. The process has 13 steps and starts with testosterone acetate.

== Natural occurrence ==
Sandaracopimaric acid was first isolated in the early 20th century by Henry and by Tschirch and Wolff from the resin of the sandarac tree, native to North Africa. It has since been identified in various plant species, including: Ramalina hierrensis, Pinus armandii, Juniperus rigida, Wollemia nobilis, and many others, where it serves as a defense against herbivores.

Sandaracopimaric acid is also found in other resins and terrestrial plants, contributing to their chemical defense mechanisms.

== Biological activity ==
Sandaracopimaric acid demonstrates anti-inflammatory effects, notably by reducing contractions in phenylephrine-induced pulmonary arteries. It acts as an inhibitor of GABA receptors and has been studied for potential therapeutic applications in inflammation-related conditions.

Research suggests roles in plant-herbivore interactions and possible antimicrobial properties, though human clinical applications remain exploratory.

== Uses ==
The acid is commercially available for research as a reference standard and is used in studies of diterpenoid biosynthesis and bioactivity.
