= Dimer acid =

Class of chemical compounds

Simplified structural formula of a dimer fatty acid. The structure may vary depending on the raw materials used. Characteristic is the cyclohexene ring formed by the Diels-Alder reaction.

Dimer acids, or dimerized fatty acids, are dicarboxylic acids prepared by dimerizing unsaturated fatty acids obtained from tall oil, usually on clay catalysts. The CAS number of the material is [61788-89-4]. Dimer acids are used primarily for synthesis of polyamide resins and polyamide hot melt adhesives. They are also used in alkyd resins, adhesives, surfactants, as fuel oil additives, lubricants, etc. It is a light yellow or yellow viscous transparent liquid.

Dimer acid usually contains predominantly a dimer of oleic acid. It is also called C36 dimer acid.

Trimer acid is a corresponding material where the resulting molecule consists of three fatty acid molecules. Its CAS number is [68937-90-6].

Dimer acids can be converted to dimer amines by reaction with ammonia and subsequent reduction.

== Production ==
Dimer fatty acids are produced from different fatty acids by heating. Necessary are a fatty acid with conjugated double bonds or other unsaturated fatty acids. Examples of such fatty acids are conjugated linoleic acids. The reaction is carried out via Diels-Alder addition, whereby a partially unsaturated C6 ring is formed. Besides the dimer, trimers as well as (unreacted) monomers of the fatty acids may be present in the mixture.
