= List of exports of Afghanistan =

Exports of Afghanistan by product category (2019) Chemical products Transportation Machines Mineral products Plastics and rubbers Metals Foodstuffs Precious metals Textiles Instruments Animal products Vegetable products Paper goods Footwear and headwear Miscellaneous Stone and glass Wood products Animal and vegetable bi-products Animal hides Arts and antiques Weapons

The following is a list of the exports of Afghanistan.

Data is for 2019, in millions of United States dollars, as reported by the International Trade Centre. Currently the top fifteen exports are listed.

#	Product	Value
1	Grapes	209
2	Natural oleoresins	129
3	Tropical fruits	96
4	Other nuts	94
5	Coal	91
6	Dried legumes	87
7	Raw cotton	57
8	Steatite	45
9	Apples, pears and quinces	43
10	Tomatoes	39
11	Allium vegetables	39
12	Gemstones	32
13	Scrap Iron	32
14	Other fruits	28
15	Spices	28
