= C20H22O10 =

C_{20}H_{22}O_{10} (Molar mass: 422.38 g/mol) may refer to:

- Erythrin, a lichen substance
- Plicatic acid, a carboxylic acid from the resin acid group
