= Abieta-7,13-dien-18-al dehydrogenase =

Class of enzymes

Identifiers
- EC no.: 1.2.1.74

Databases
- IntEnz: IntEnz view
- BRENDA: BRENDA entry
- ExPASy: NiceZyme view
- KEGG: KEGG entry
- MetaCyc: metabolic pathway
- PRIAM: profile
- PDB structures: RCSB PDB PDBe PDBsum
Search
- PMC: articles
- PubMed: articles
- NCBI: proteins

Abieta-7,13-dien-18-al dehydrogenase (EC 1.2.1.74, abietadienal dehydrogenase (ambiguous)) is an enzyme with systematic name abieta-7,13-dien-18-al:NAD^{+} oxidoreductase. This enzyme catalyses the following chemical reaction:

abietal
+ NAD^{+}
H_{2}O
2 H^{+}
H_{2}O
2 H^{+}
abietic acid
+ NADH

The enzyme catalyses the last step of the pathway of abietic acid biosynthesis in Abies grandis.
