= Abietic acid dermatitis =

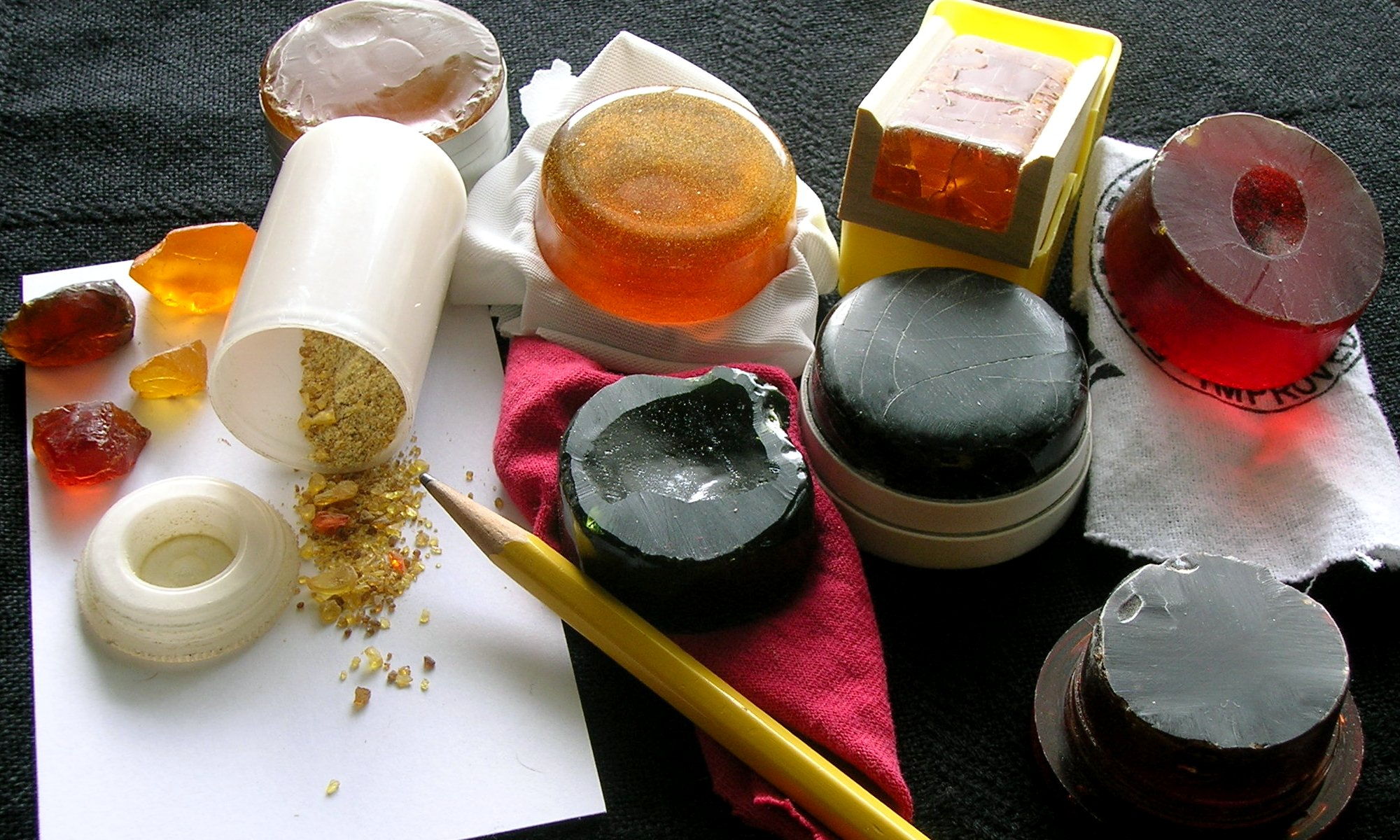
- Various types of rosin for violins, violas and cellos
- Specialty: Dermatology

Abietic acid dermatitis is a contact dermatitis often seen in association with musical instruments.

== Causes ==
The main cause is a type-I hypersensitivity reaction to products containing abietic acid, such as the rosin/colophony, which is commonly used as a friction-increasing agent. Players of bowed string instruments (violin, viola, cello, double bass) rub cakes or blocks of rosin on their bow so it can grip the strings. Ballet and flamenco dancers sometimes rub their shoes in powdered rosin to reduce slippage before going on stage. Gymnasts, baseball pitchers and ten pin bowlers use rosin to improve grip. Common locations of this contact dermatitis are hands, face and neck.

It has also occurred as a result of dehydroabietic acid in an over-the-counter hydrocolloid dressing.

== Diagnosis ==
=== Differential diagnosis ===
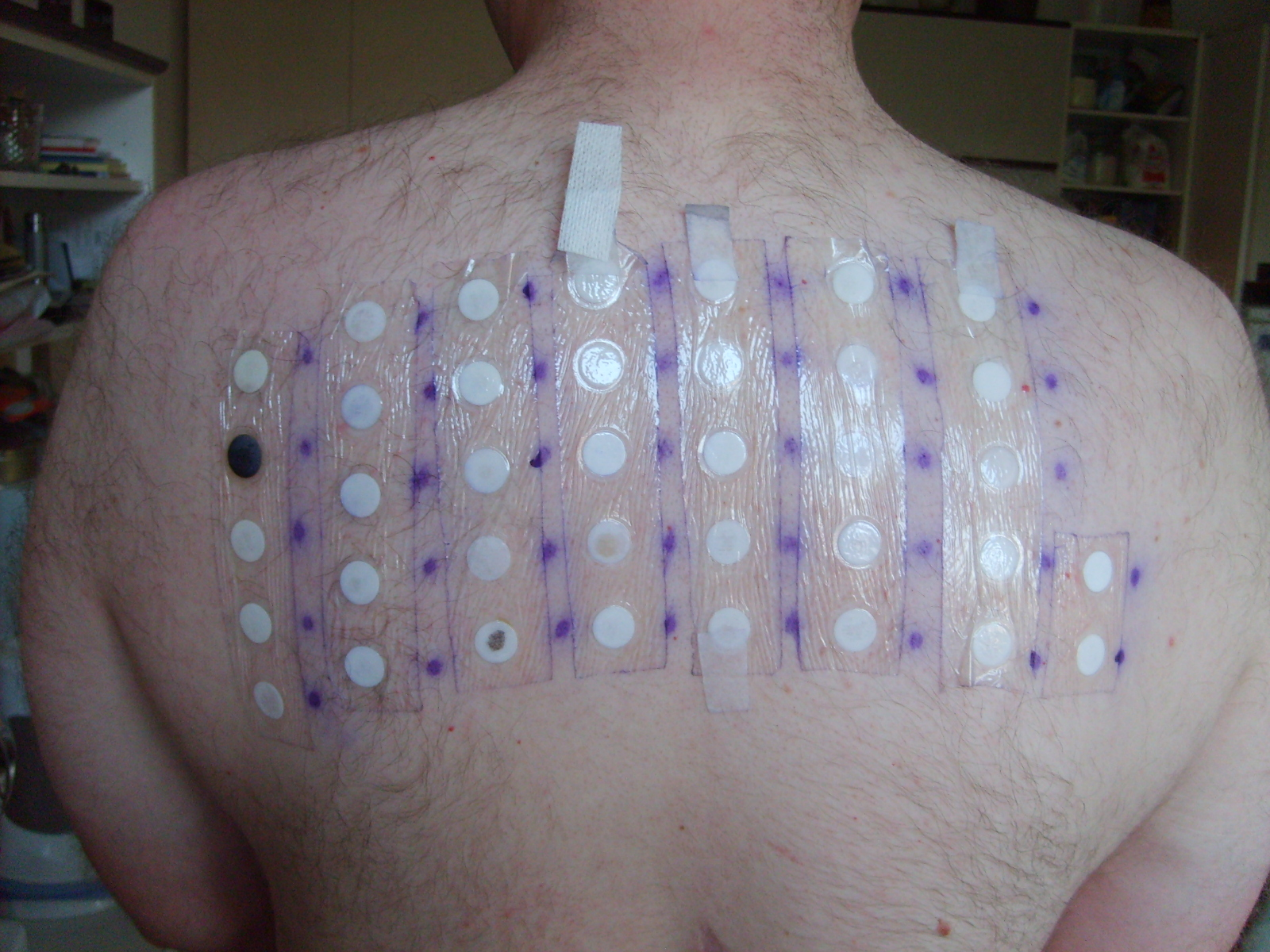
Patch test

Cutaneous disorders in musicians include frictional injury ("fiddler's neck"), hyperhidrosis, acne mechanica and vascular compromise. Other agents of irritant and allergic contact dermatitis may be rosewood, Makassar ebony, cocobolo wood, African blackwood, nickel, reed, propolis (bee glue), chromium and paraphenylenediamine. Patch testing can be performed for identification of the cause.

== Treatment ==
Treatment may include corticoids, astringents, and keratolytics. Dermatoses tend to be recurrent unless the use or contact can be avoided. Discontinuation of the instrument is curative in almost all cases, but usually impractical.

== See also ==
- Contact dermatitis
- Chloracne
- List of cutaneous conditions
