= C20H30O4 =

The molecular formula C_{20}H_{30}O_{4} (molar mass: 334.45 g/mol) may refer to:

- Hepoxilin
- Agathic acid
