= Levopimaric acid =

Names
- IUPAC name Abieta-11,13-dien-18-oic acid
- Systematic IUPAC name (1R,4aR,4bS,10aR)-1,4a-Dimethyl-7-(propan-2-yl)-1,2,3,4,4a,4b,5,9,10,10a-decahydrophenanthrene-1-carboxylic acid
- Other names 13-isopropylpodocarpa-8(14),12-dien-15-oic acid; D6,8(14)-abietadienoic acid; l-pimaric acid; β-pimaric acid; l-sapietic acid

Identifiers
CAS Number	79-54-9
3D model (JSmol)	Interactive image
ChemSpider	191771
PubChem CID	25201105
UNII	6073C2A77I
CompTox Dashboard (EPA)	DTXSID20878526
- InChI: InChI=1S/C20H30O2/c1-13(2)14-6-8-16-15(12-14)7-9-17-19(16,3)10-5-11-20(17,4)18(21)22/h6,12-13,16-17H,5,7-11H2,1-4H3,(H,21,22)/t16-,17+,19+,20+/m0/s1 Key: RWWVEQKPFPXLGL-ONCXSQPRSA-N; InChI=1/C20H30O2/c1-13(2)14-6-8-16-15(12-14)7-9-17-19(16,3)10-5-11-20(17,4)18(21)22/h6,12-13,16-17H,5,7-11H2,1-4H3,(H,21,22)/t16-,17+,19+,20+/m0/s1 Key: RWWVEQKPFPXLGL-ONCXSQPRBO
- SMILES: O=C(O)[C@]3([C@@H]2CCC\1=C\C(=C/C[C@@H]/1[C@@]2(C)CCC3)C(C)C)C

Properties
Chemical formula	C_{20}H_{30}O_{2}
Molar mass	302.458 g·mol^{−1}
Appearance	Orthorhombic crystals
Melting point	150 °C (302 °F; 423 K)
Solubility in water	Practically insoluble in water
- Except where otherwise noted, data are given for materials in their standard state (at 25 °C [77 °F], 100 kPa). Infobox references

Levopimaric acid is an abietane-type of diterpene resin acid. It is a major constituent of pine oleoresin with the chemical formula of C_{20}H_{30}O_{2}. In general, the abietene types of diterpene resin acid have various biological activities, such as antibacterial, cardiovascular and antioxidant. Levopimaric acid accounts for about 18 to 25% of pine oleoresin. The production of oleoresin by conifer species is an important component of the defense response against insect attack and fungal pathogen infection.

== Resin acids ==
Resin acid is the general name for all kinds of acids that share the same basic skeleton, a three-fused ring and the empirical formula C_{20}H_{30}O_{2}. The resin acids may be classified into two types, abietic and pimaric. The abietic-type group include levopimaric, l-abietic and neoabietic. The structure of these compounds differ only in the position of the conjugated double bond system. This feature influences their chemical reactivity. The pimaric-type acids are dextropimaric and isodextropimaric.

== Extraction from pine resin ==
Levopimaric acid can be extracted from longleaf pine oleoresin by first dissolving it in a solution of acetone and 2-amino-2-methyl-1-propanol, then acidifying with phosphoric acid.

== Biosynthesis ==
Biosynthesis of levopimaric acid

The abietane-like skeleton of levopimaric acid is formed by the cyclization of a diterpenoid precursor, geranylgeranyl diphosphate, from which C_{20} isoprenoids are typically derived. The intermediate which is formed, (+)-copalyl diphosphate, then goes through an oxidation and rearrangement to give levopimaradiene. Then, the levopimaradiene goes through several more steps of oxidation processes via the intermediates levopimaradienol and levepimaradienal to give levopimaric acid.

== Role in biology ==
Oleoresin in pines is defined as pine gum, which is the nonaqueous secretion of resin acids dissolved in a terpene hydrocarbon oil, which is produced in or exuded from the intercellular resin ducts of a living tree. The viscous oleoresin secretion is composed of a complex mixture of terpenoids, consisting of roughly equal parts of volatile turpentine and rosin (also known as diterpene resin acids). Accumulated resin is released upon tissue injury and/or produced locally at the site of infestation, with the consequence that the beetle and associated fungal pathogens are killed, encased in resin, and expelled from the bore hole point of entry. This process is called pitching out, and it results in not only killing the attackers and flushing the wound site but also moving the oleoresin to the trunk surface where the turpentine evaporates to permit the resin acids to form a formidable physical barrier that seals the wound. Diterpene resin acids (DRA) play important roles in confer defense against insects and microbial pathogens. Levopimaric acid, an abietane-type DRA, is one of the principal resin acids.
