= Plicatic acid =

Names
- IUPAC name (7′β,8β,8′α)-3′,4,4′,8,8′,9-Hexahydroxy-5,5′-dimethoxy-2,7′-cyclolignan-9-oic acid
- Systematic IUPAC name (1S,2S,3R)-1-(3,4-Dihydroxy-5-methoxyphenyl)-2,3,7-trihydroxy-3-(hydroxymethyl)-6-methoxy-1,2,3,4-tetrahydronaphthalene-2-carboxylic acid

Identifiers
CAS Number	16462-65-0
3D model (JSmol)	Interactive image
ChemSpider	94630
PubChem CID	104836
UNII	G3VF11QD86
CompTox Dashboard (EPA)	DTXSID40894748
- InChI: InChI=1S/C20H22O10/c1-29-14-5-10-7-19(27,8-21)20(28,18(25)26)16(11(10)6-12(14)22)9-3-13(23)17(24)15(4-9)30-2/h3-6,16,21-24,27-28H,7-8H2,1-2H3,(H,25,26)/t16-,19+,20+/m0/s1 Key: PGFBYAIGHPJFFJ-PWIZWCRZSA-N; InChI=1/C20H22O10/c1-29-14-5-10-7-19(27,8-21)20(28,18(25)26)16(11(10)6-12(14)22)9-3-13(23)17(24)15(4-9)30-2/h3-6,16,21-24,27-28H,7-8H2,1-2H3,(H,25,26)/t16-,19+,20+/m0/s1 Key: PGFBYAIGHPJFFJ-PWIZWCRZBT
- SMILES: O=C(O)[C@]2(O)[C@H](c1c(cc(OC)c(O)c1)C[C@@]2(O)CO)c3cc(O)c(O)c(OC)c3

Properties
Chemical formula	C_{20}H_{22}O_{10}
Molar mass	422.386 g·mol^{−1}
- Except where otherwise noted, data are given for materials in their standard state (at 25 °C [77 °F], 100 kPa). verify (what is ?) Infobox references

Plicatic acid is a carboxylic acid from the resin acid group. It is naturally found in Thuja and cypress resin, and the main irritant and contact allergen present in thuja wood; in contrast to pine, where the primary irritant is abietic acid.

The highest concentrations of plicatic acid can be found in Thuja plicata (western red cedar), but Thuja occidentalis (eastern arborvitae) and Cryptomeria japonica (sugi) contain it in significant proportions as well.

Exposure to plicatic acid or Thuja wood dust can worsen asthma and provoke allergic reactions.
