= Agathic acid =

Diterpenoid resin acid

Names
- IUPAC name (1S,4aR,5S,8aR)-5-[(E)-4-carboxy-3-methylbut-3-enyl]-1,4a-dimethyl-6-methylidene-3,4,5,7,8,8a-hexahydro-2H-naphthalene-1-carboxylic acid

Identifiers
CAS Number	640-28-8
3D model (JSmol)	Interactive image
ChEMBL	ChEMBL457162
ChemSpider	4941484
PubChem CID	6436877
- InChI: InChI=1S/C20H30O4/c1-13(12-17(21)22)6-8-15-14(2)7-9-16-19(15,3)10-5-11-20(16,4)18(23)24/h12,15-16H,2,5-11H2,1,3-4H3,(H,21,22)(H,23,24)/b13-12+/t15-,16+,19+,20-/m0/s1 Key: QYCOHMYDSOZCQD-GWEOMKHGSA-N
- SMILES: C/C(=C\C(=O)O)/CC[C@H]1C(=C)CC[C@@H]2[C@@]1(CCC[C@]2(C)C(=O)O)C

Properties
Chemical formula	C_{20}H_{30}O_{4}
Molar mass	334.456 g·mol^{−1}
- Except where otherwise noted, data are given for materials in their standard state (at 25 °C [77 °F], 100 kPa). Infobox references

Agathic acid, also known as agathate, is a diterpenoid resin acid (a labdane-type diterpene with carboxyl functionality) naturally found in the resins of coniferous trees, particularly in the family Araucariaceae (e.g. Agathis, Araucaria).

== Occurrence and chemical properties ==
Agathic acid is a component of kauri resin, also known as kauri gum from Agathis species, and is also found in some Araucaria resins. It contributes to the chemical profile and physical properties (e.g. durability) of those resins and is used as a biomarker in studies of fossil or subfossil resins and amber-like materials.

Agathic acid has the following molecular formula, C_{20}H_{30}O_{4}. It is a dicarboxylic or bicyclic carboxylic acid. It is sometimes given the synonym labda-8(17),13-diene-15,19-dioic acid.

== Synthesis and bioactivity ==
A total synthesis of (–)-agathic acid was first reported in 2016, using andrographolide as starting material in 14 steps.

Agathic acid is primarily known as a structural and chemical constituent of resins rather than as a major pharmacological agent. Some resin acids (including related ones) have mild antimicrobial or defensive roles in plants. In modern studies, synthetic derivatives of agathic acid are being investigated for biological effects.

In 2025, a chemical investigation of the fungus Penicillium thomii yielded 14 agathic acid derivatives.

== See also ==
- Resin acid
- Labdane
- Copalic acid
