= Resin extraction =

Process of collecting sap or resin from pine trees

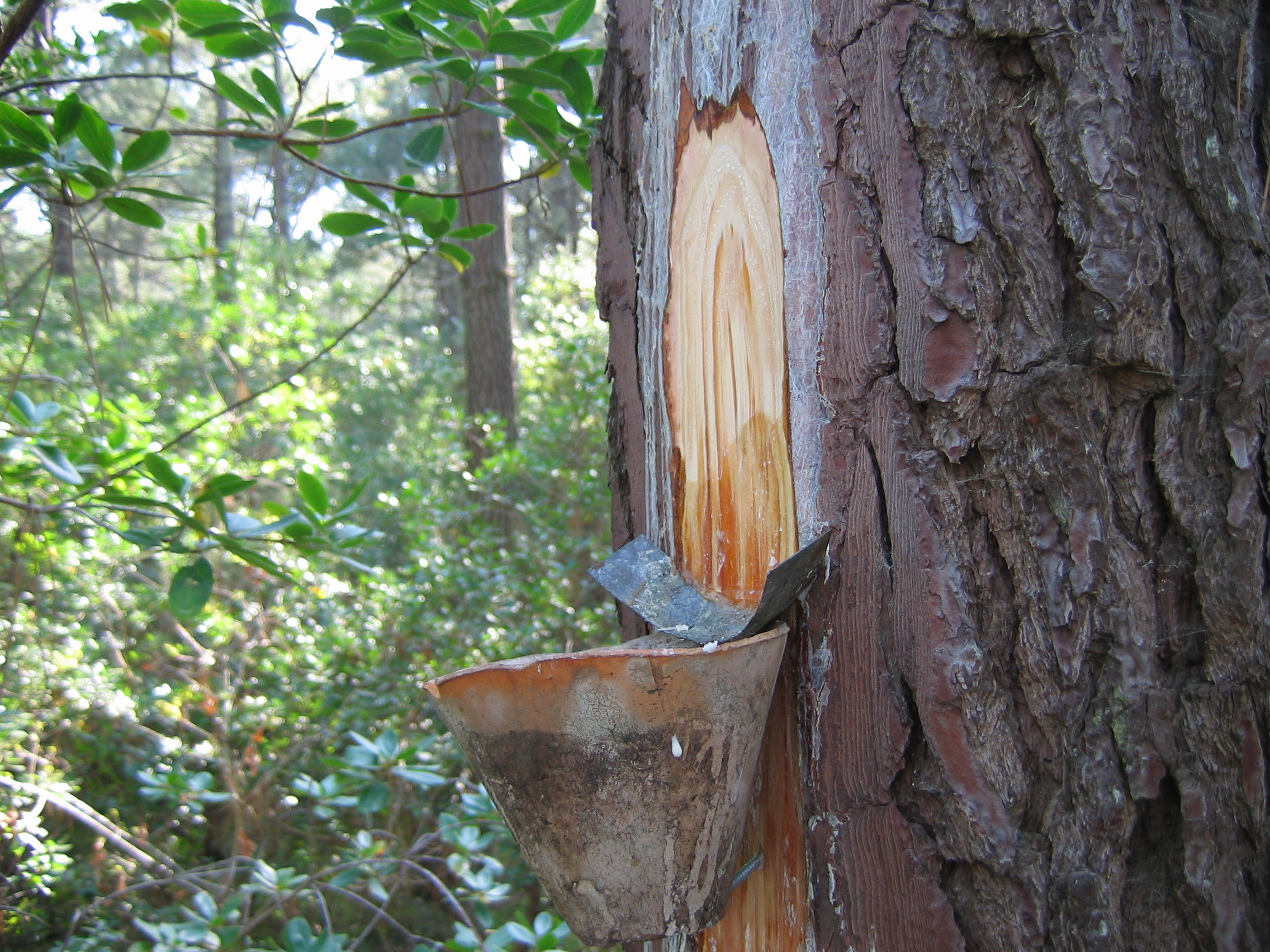
Tapped pine in the Pays de Buch

Resin extraction consists of incising the outer layers of a pine tree in order to collect the sap or resin.

== Summary ==
Resin circulates throughout a coniferous tree and a few others, and serves to seal damage to the tree. Harvesting pine resin dates back at least to Gallo-Roman times in Gascony, Europe, and possibly earlier in North America.

Tapping pines may either be done so as to sustain the life of the tree, or exhaustively in the years before the tree is cut down.

== Traditional tapping ==
In Gascony, and to a lesser extent in Provence, pine-tapping was practised as a form of sharecropping, although uncertain status of the workers sometimes led to labour disputes.

Although almost abandoned during the 20th century, in Spain it has experienced something of a resurgence.

== Procedure ==
Resin is usually collected by causing minor damage to the tree by making a hole far enough into the trunk to puncture the vacuoles, to let sap exit the tree, known as tapping, and then letting the tree repair its damage by filling the wound with resin. This usually takes a few days. Then, excess resin is collected.

== Gallery ==
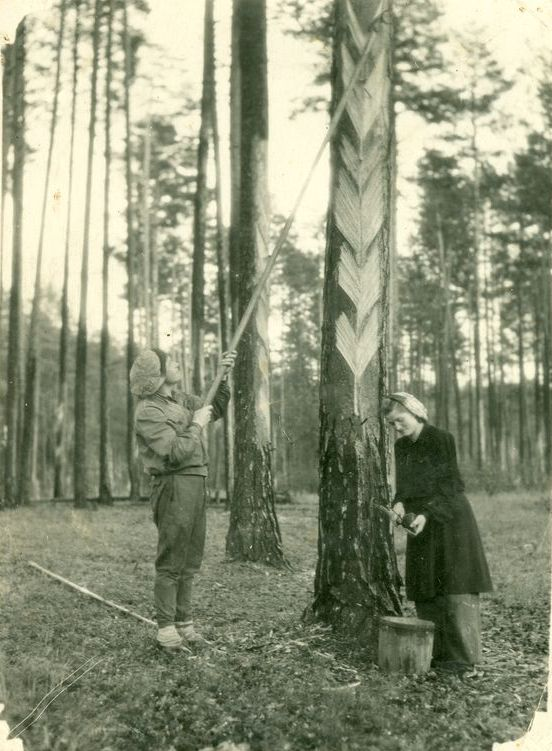
Lithuanian deportees into Russia extract resin near Irkutsk.

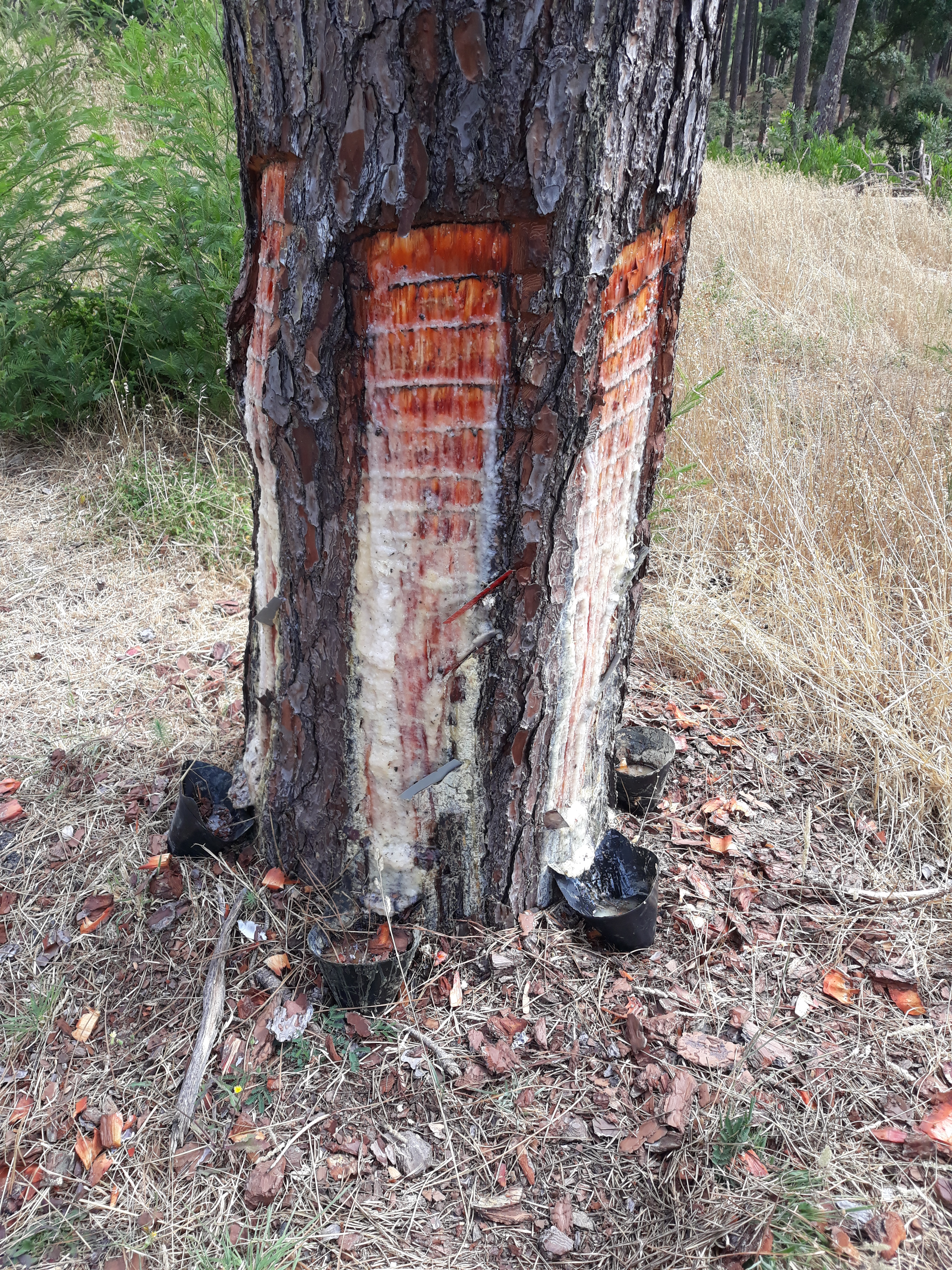

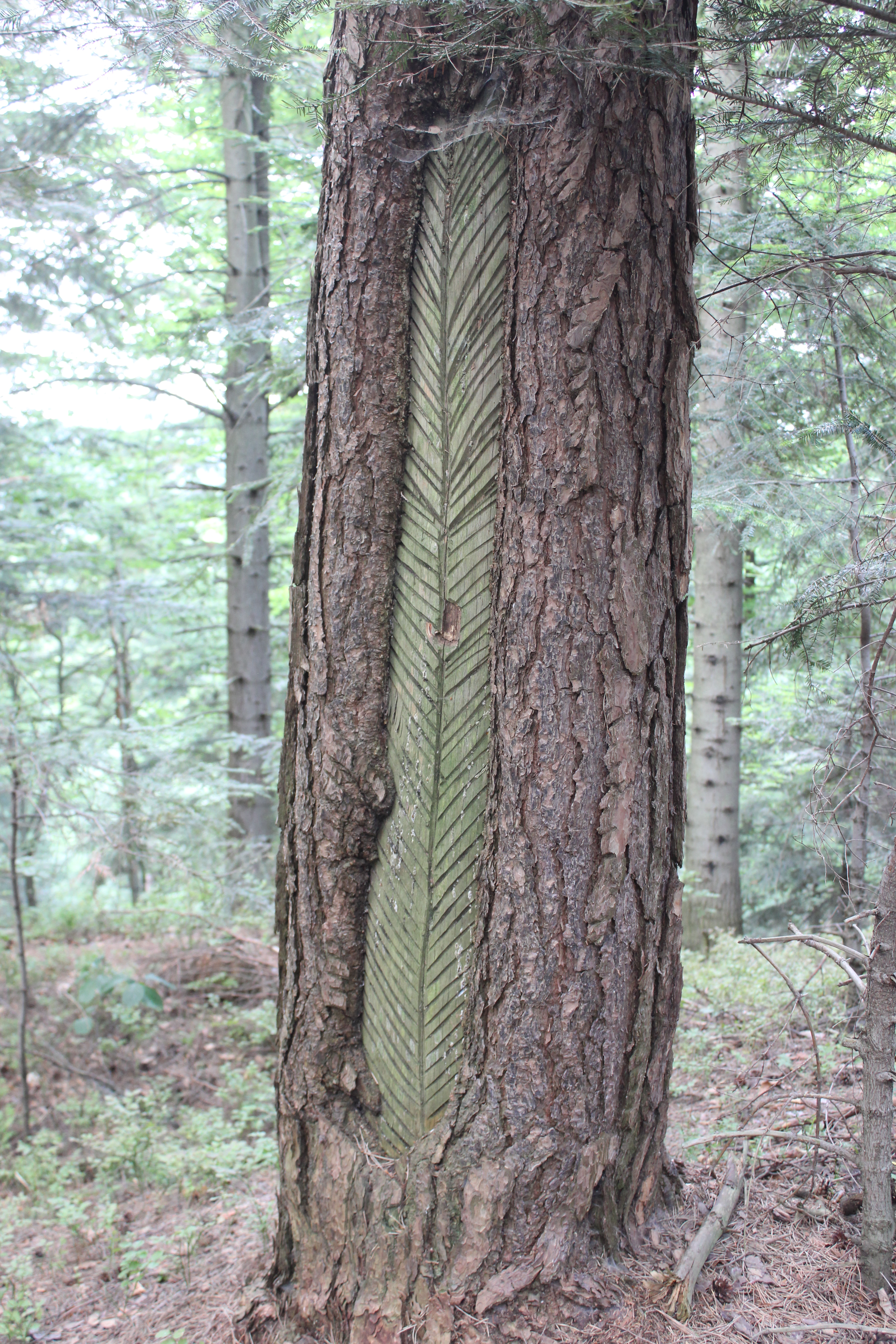

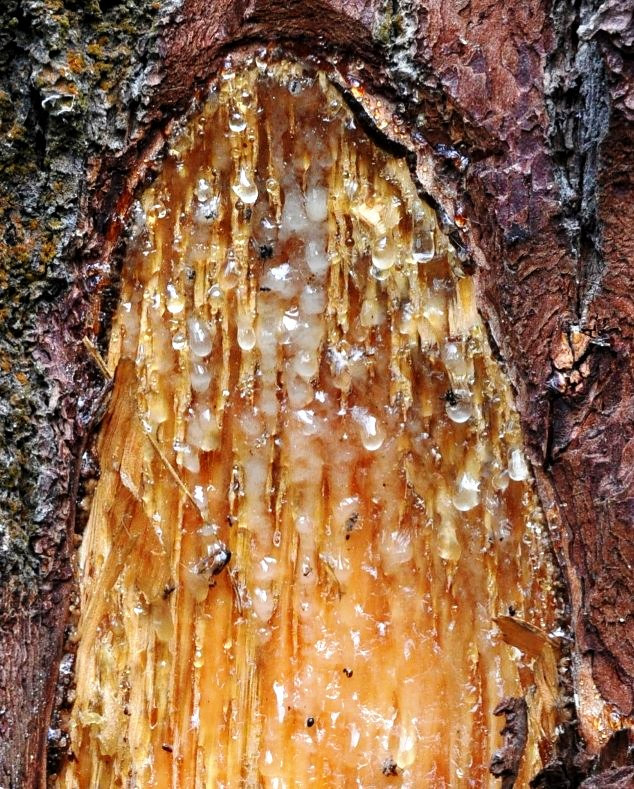
Resin

== See also ==
- Maple syrup
- Naval stores industry
- Rosin
- Rubber tapping
- Turpentine
