= Palustric acid =

Names
- IUPAC name (1R,4aS,10aR)-1,4a-dimethyl-7-propan-2-yl-2,3,4,5,6,9,10,10a-octahydrophenanthrene-1-carboxylic acid

Identifiers
CAS Number	1945-53-5
3D model (JSmol)	Interactive image
ChEBI	CHEBI:29660
ChemSpider	391763
KEGG	C12077
PubChem CID	443613
UNII	A2QAG30V3T
CompTox Dashboard (EPA)	DTXSID90858759
- InChI: InChI=1S/C20H30O2/c1-13(2)14-6-8-16-15(12-14)7-9-17-19(16,3)10-5-11-20(17,4)18(21)22/h12-13,17H,5-11H2,1-4H3,(H,21,22)/t17-,19-,20-/m1/s1 Key: MLBYBBUZURKHAW-MISYRCLQSA-N
- SMILES: CC(C)C1=CC2=C(CC1)[C@]3(CCC[C@@]([C@@H]3CC2)(C)C(=O)O)C

Properties
Chemical formula	C_{20}H_{30}O_{2}
Molar mass	302.458 g·mol^{−1}
Appearance	colorless solid
Melting point	164.5 °C (328.1 °F; 437.6 K)
Solubility in water	2.41mg/L
- Except where otherwise noted, data are given for materials in their standard state (at 25 °C [77 °F], 100 kPa). Infobox references

Palustric acid is an organic compound with the formula C_{20}H_{30}O_{2}. It is classified as a diterpenoid (a C20 hydrocarbon with oxygenated groups) and a resin acid. Palustric acid is an isomer of abietic acid: the location of the two C=C bonds differ in these two compounds. It is a colorless solid that is soluble in polar organic solvents. In terms of biological function palustric acid protects its host trees, especially conifers, against insects, an example of plant defense against herbivory. It is biosynthesized from the C20 precursor geranylgeranyl diphosphate.

== Safety ==
Palustric acid is very poorly soluble in water and has low acute toxicity.
