= Galipot =

Resin of turpentine obtained from pine trees

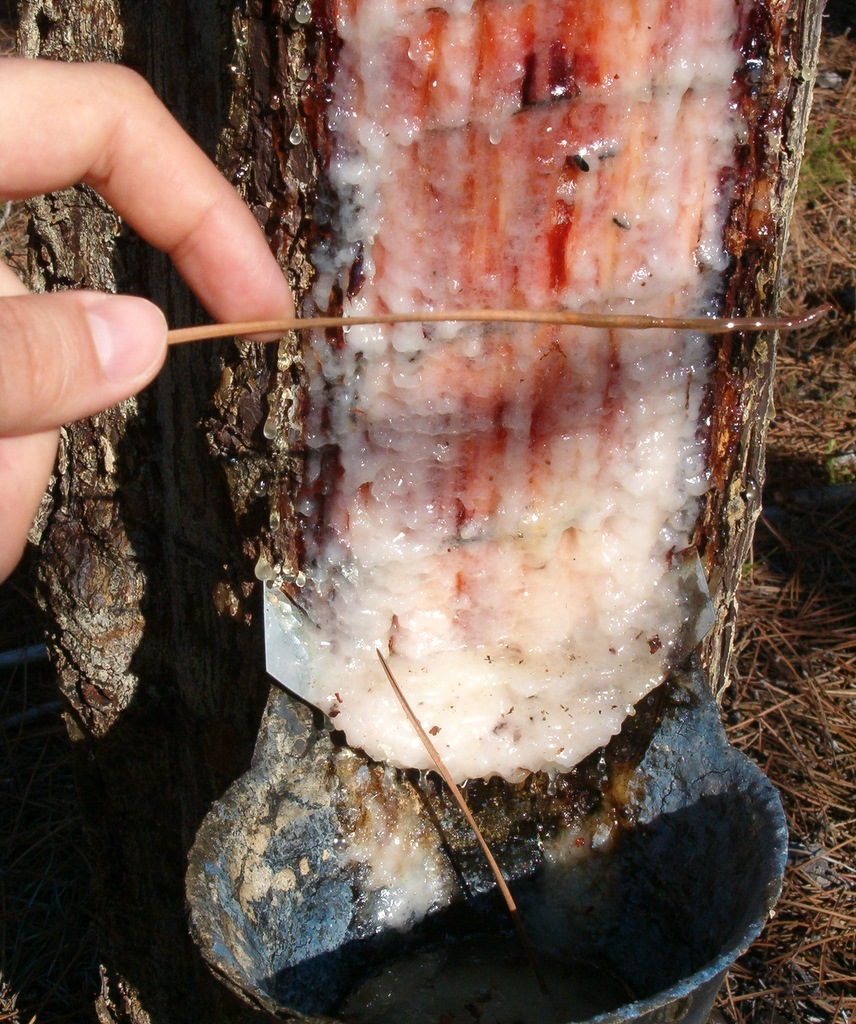
Extraction of gallipot

Galipot is an impure resin of turpentine. It is obtained from pine trees by evaporation of the essential oil and once purified is called yellow pitch, white pitch or Burgundy pitch.
