= Tall oil =

Viscous liquid obtained as a by-product of wood pulp manufacture

Tall oil, also called liquid rosin or tallol, is a viscous yellow-black odorous liquid obtained as a by-product of the kraft process of wood pulp manufacture when pulping mainly coniferous trees. The name originated as an anglicization of the Swedish tallolja ('pine oil'). Tall oil is the third largest chemical by-product in a kraft mill after lignin and hemicellulose. The kraft process yields in the range of 30–50 kg of crude tall oil per ton pulp. If not used internally, sales of tall oil can contribute up to 1.0–1.5% of the mill's revenue.

== Manufacturing ==
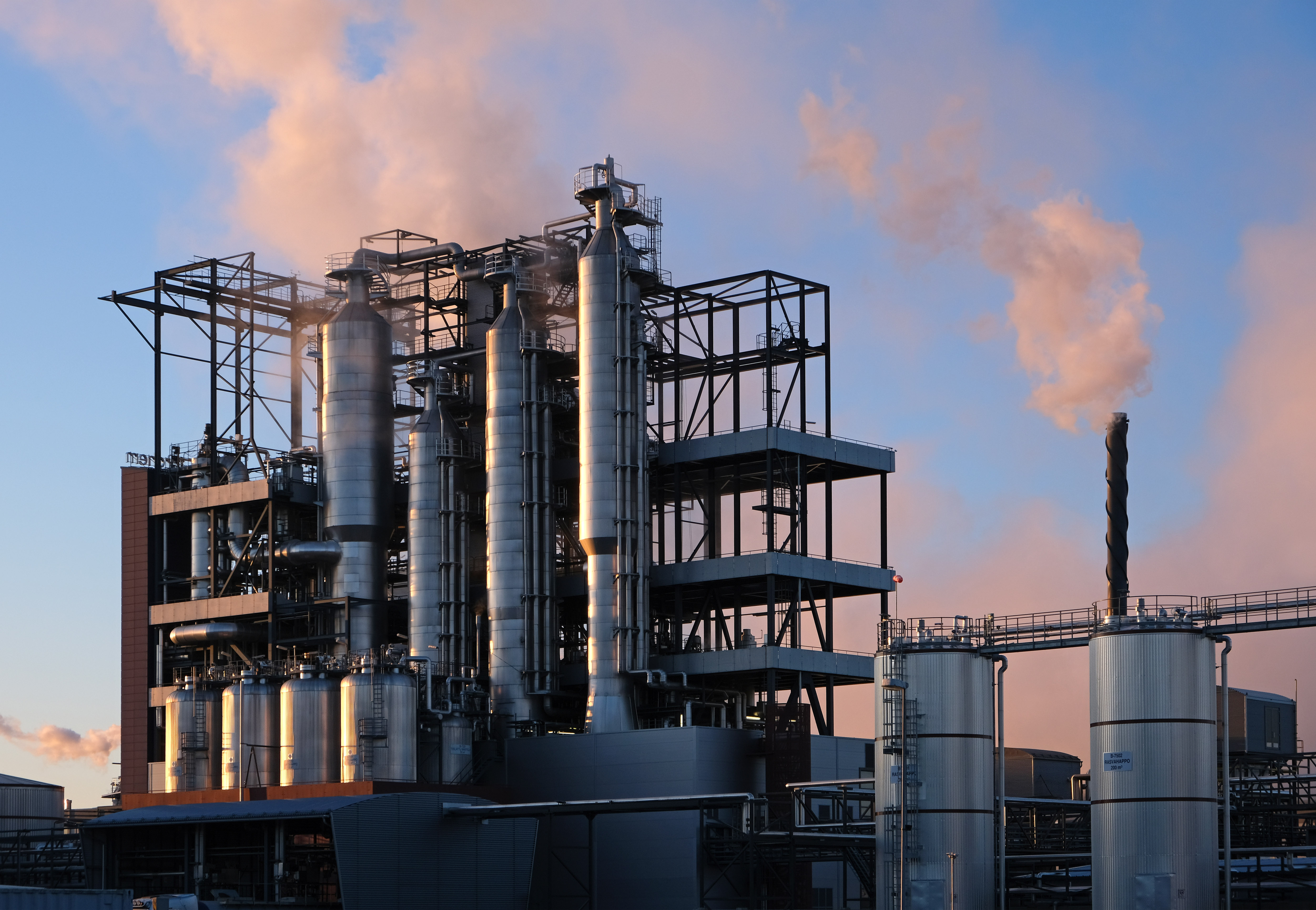
Forchem tall oil refinery in Rauma, Finland

In the kraft process, high alkalinity and temperature convert the esters and carboxylic acids in rosin into soluble sodium soaps of lignin, rosin, and fatty acids. The spent cooking liquor is called weak black liquor and is about 15% dry content. The black liquor is concentrated in a multiple effect evaporator and after the first stage the black liquor is about 20–30% solids. At this stage it is called intermediate liquor. Normally the soaps start to float in the storage tank for the weak or intermediate liquors and are skimmed off and collected. A good soap skimming operation reduces the soap content of the black liquor down to 0.2–0.4% w/w of the dry residue. The collected soap is called raw rosin soap or rosinate. The raw rosin soap is then allowed to settle or is centrifuged to release as much of the entrained black liquor as possible. The soap goes then to the acidulator where it is heated and acidified with sulfuric acid to produce crude tall oil (CTO).

The soap skimming and acidulator operation can be improved by addition of flocculants. A flocculant will shorten the separation time and give a cleaner soap with lower viscosity. This makes the acidulator run more smoothly as well.

Most pines give a soap yield of 5–25 kg/ton pulp, while Scots pine gives 20–50 kg/ton. Scots pine grown in northern Scandinavia give a yield of even more than 50 kg/ton. Globally about 2 mill ton/year of CTO are refined.

== Composition ==
The composition of crude tall oil depends on the type of wood used. A common quality measure for tall oil is acid number. With pure pines it is possible to have acid numbers in the range 160–165, while mills using a mix of softwoods and hardwoods might give acid numbers in the range of 125–135.

Normally crude tall oil contains rosins, which contains resin acids (mainly abietic acid and its isomers), fatty acids (mainly palmitic acid, oleic acid and linoleic acid) and fatty alcohols, unsaponifiable sterols (5–10%), other sterols, and other alkyl hydrocarbon derivatives.

Fractional distillation of the crude tall oil produces pitch, tall oil rosin with a high purity in abietic acid, Tall Oil Fatty Acid (TOFA) consisting of non-saturated acids (mainly oleic acid and linoleic acid), and Distilled Tall Oil (DTO) consisting of a mix of heavier fatty acids and abietic acid.

== Applications ==
Historically, CTO was primarily refined into four different fractions:

- Pitch
- Tall oil rosin (TOR)
- Tall oil fatty acid (TOFA)
- Distilled tall oil (DTO)

Pitch was historically prized as a natural adhesive, waterproof sealant, and in some traditional medicine, and is still used for some of these purposes It is also used as a binder in cement, an adhesive, and an emulsifier for asphalt.. TOR is used as a component of adhesives, rubbers, and inks, and as an emulsifier. TOFA is a low-cost and vegan alternative to tallow fatty acids for production of soaps and lubricants. When esterified with pentaerythritol, it is used as a compound of adhesives and oil-based varnishes. When TOFA is dimerized to dimer acid it is used for making polyamide and epoxy resin. DTO is used for making alkyd resins, which improve the hardness, drying time, and water resistance of paints and varnishes.

In addition to being the source of these fractions, CTO is also used as an advanced feedstock for biofuels like hydrotreated vegetable oil (HVO)/renewable diesel and sustainable aviation fuels (SAF). As the preference for biofuels has increased, so has demand for CTO for this use. From 2008 to 2019 demand for CTO as a biofuel feedstock increased 60%. Given that CTO is a byproduct of the kraft pulping process and paper and paperboard production is on the decline (having peaked in 1999 and dropped 24% since), CTO is in increasingly short supply for all uses. In some regions CTO demand now exceeds supply. This has constrained the supply of CTO available for fractioning, leading to the development of synthetic alternatives. These include R-6000 (a soy-based alternative developed specifically for metalworking fluid formulations) and TruFA (derived from seed and vegetable oils in different formulations to suit a range of industrial and agricultural processes). These alternatives tend to come from plant sources with much shorter growing cycles than traditional tall oil, and require less energy-intensive processing.
