= Bosseopentaenoic acid =

20-Carbon polyunsaturated fatty acid

Names
- Preferred IUPAC name (5Z,8Z,10E,12E,14Z)-Icosa-5,8,10,12,14-pentaenoic acid
- Other names 20:5Δ5Z,8Z,10E,12E,14Z

Identifiers
| 3D model (JSmol) | Interactive image |
| ChemSpider | 10475853 |
| PubChem CID | 21773816 |
| CompTox Dashboard (EPA) | DTXSID601027546 |
- InChI: InChI=1S/C20H30O2/c1-2-3-4-5-6-7-8-9-10-11-12-13-14-15-16-17-18-19-20(21)22/h6-13,15-16H,2-5,14,17-19H2,1H3,(H,21,22)/b7-6-,9-8+,11-10+,13-12-,16-15- Key: QQXWWCIEPUFZQL-JMFSJNRSSA-N; InChI=1/C20H30O2/c1-2-3-4-5-6-7-8-9-10-11-12-13-14-15-16-17-18-19-20(21)22/h6-13,15-16H,2-5,14,17-19H2,1H3,(H,21,22)/b7-6-,9-8+,11-10+,13-12-,16-15- Key: QQXWWCIEPUFZQL-JMFSJNRSBI
- SMILES: OC(=O)CCC/C=C\C/C=C\C=C\C=C\C=C/CCCCC

Properties
| Chemical formula | C_{20}H_{30}O_{2} |
| Molar mass | 302.458 g·mol^{−1} |
- Except where otherwise noted, data are given for materials in their standard state (at 25 °C [77 °F], 100 kPa). verify (what is ?) Infobox references

Bosseopentaenoic acid (BPA) is a conjugated polyunsaturated fatty acid. Bosseopentaenoic acid can be extracted from the red coralline algae, Bossiella orbigniana. The first total synthesis of methyl bosseopentaenoate by consecutive palladium-catalyzed reactions was reported in 2011. In 2017, bosseopentaenoic acid was obtained from the ester hydrolysis of methyl bosseopentaenoate in good yield using mild condition and the synthesis of its sulfur-bridged analogue of BPA; thiophene analogue was achieved by Mohamed and Solum In this study, a comparison between the thiophene analogue and BPA with respect to their antioxidant activity was accomplished. It was shown that the rigidified analogue; the thiophene analogue exhibited higher free radical scavenging potential than the bosseopentaenoic acid. The results showed that by lowering the flexibility of the BPA as lead compound by incorporation thiophene ring in its structure, an increased antioxidant activity was observed. This study opens the door to investigate the relationship between the flexibility of other polyunsaturated fatty acids (PUFAs) and enhancement in the biological activity.
