= Isopimaric acid =

Names
- IUPAC name (13S)-Pimara-7,15-dien-18-oic acid
- Systematic IUPAC name (1R,4aR,4bS,7S,10aR)-7-Ethenyl-1,4a,7-trimethyl-1,2,3,4,4a,4b,5,6,7,8,10,10a-dodecahydrophenanthrene-1-carboxylic acid

Identifiers
| CAS Number | 5835-26-7 |
| 3D model (JSmol) | Interactive image |
| ChEBI | CHEBI:6039 |
| ChEMBL | ChEMBL512164 |
| ChemSpider | 390596 |
| ECHA InfoCard | 100.163.144 |
| KEGG | C09118 |
| PubChem CID | 442048 |
| UNII | 1E37K85HHK |
| CompTox Dashboard (EPA) | DTXSID9022233 |
- InChI: InChI=1S/C20H30O2/c1-5-18(2)12-9-15-14(13-18)7-8-16-19(15,3)10-6-11-20(16,4)17(21)22/h5,7,15-16H,1,6,8-13H2,2-4H3,(H,21,22)/t15-,16+,18-,19+,20+/m0/s1 Key: MXYATHGRPJZBNA-KRFUXDQASA-N; InChI=1/C20H30O2/c1-5-18(2)12-9-15-14(13-18)7-8-16-19(15,3)10-6-11-20(16,4)17(21)22/h5,7,15-16H,1,6,8-13H2,2-4H3,(H,21,22)/t15-,16+,18-,19+,20+/m0/s1 Key: MXYATHGRPJZBNA-KRFUXDQABR
- SMILES: [H][C@]12[C@](C)(C(O)=O)CCC[C@]1(C)[C@]3([H])C(C[C@](C=C)(C)CC3)=CC2

Properties
| Chemical formula | C_{20}H_{30}O_{2} |
| Molar mass | 302.458 g·mol^{−1} |
- Except where otherwise noted, data are given for materials in their standard state (at 25 °C [77 °F], 100 kPa). verify (what is ?) Infobox references

Isopimaric acid (IPA) is a toxin which acts as a large conductance Ca^{2+}-activated K^{+} channel (BK channel) opener.

== Sources ==
IPA originates from many sorts of trees, especially conifers.

== Chemistry ==
IPA is one of the members of the resin acid group and it is a tricyclic diterpene.

== Target ==
IPA acts on the large-conductance calcium activated K+ channels (BK channels).

== Mode of action ==
BK channels are formed by α subunits and accessory β subunits arranged in tetramers. The α subunit forms the ion conduction pore and the β subunit contributes to channel gating. IPA interaction with the BK channel enhances Ca^{2+} and / or voltage sensitivity of the α subunit of BK channels without affecting the channel conductance. In this state BK channels can still be inhibited by one of their inhibitors, like charybdotoxin (CTX). Opening of the BK channel leads to an increased K^{+}-efflux which hyperpolarizes the resting membrane potential, reducing the excitability of the cell in which the BK-channel is expressed.

== Toxicity ==
Studies on rainbow trout hepatocytes have shown that IPA increases intracellular calcium release, leading to a disturbance in the calcium homeostasis. This could be important in the possible toxicity of the toxin.

== See also ==
- Pimaric acid
