= Oleoresin =

Defensive secretion of conifer trees

Oleoresin (/ˌoʊlioʊˈrɛzən/) is a terpene-rich defensive secretion of conifer trees, composed of a volatile turpentine fraction, and a semi-solid resin and essential or fatty oil. The oleoresin of conifers are known as crude turpentine or gum turpentine, which consists of oil of turpentine and rosin.

Oleoresin yields are affected by extrinsic factors, such as soil fertility, temperature, relative humidity and precipitation, by intrinsic factors, such as genetics, age, size, health, and competition.

In kraft pulping, conifer woodchips are cooked with chemicals to extract cellulose fiber, oleoresin is also extracted as a tall oil byproduct. Industrial oleoresin derivatives are versatile:

Rosin and derivatives
Adhesives, sizing, tackifiers, plasticizers, printing inks.
Turpentine
Solvents in coatings, paints.
Fatty acids
Soap, detergents, lubricants, drilling fluids.

When the oleoresin of the balsam fir tree (Abies balsamea) is dissolved in xylene and used for making permanent microscope slides, it is called Canada balsam.

== Oleoresin capsicum ==
An extract from chili (Capsicum) peppers. Capsaicinoid fractions are obtained by evaporating relevant solvents. Capsaicinoids cause dermatitis as well as nasal, ocular, pulmonary, and gastrointestinal effects in humans.

Processing of oleoresin capsicum is conducted on a large scale, especially in China (400,000 tons per year in the 1990s).

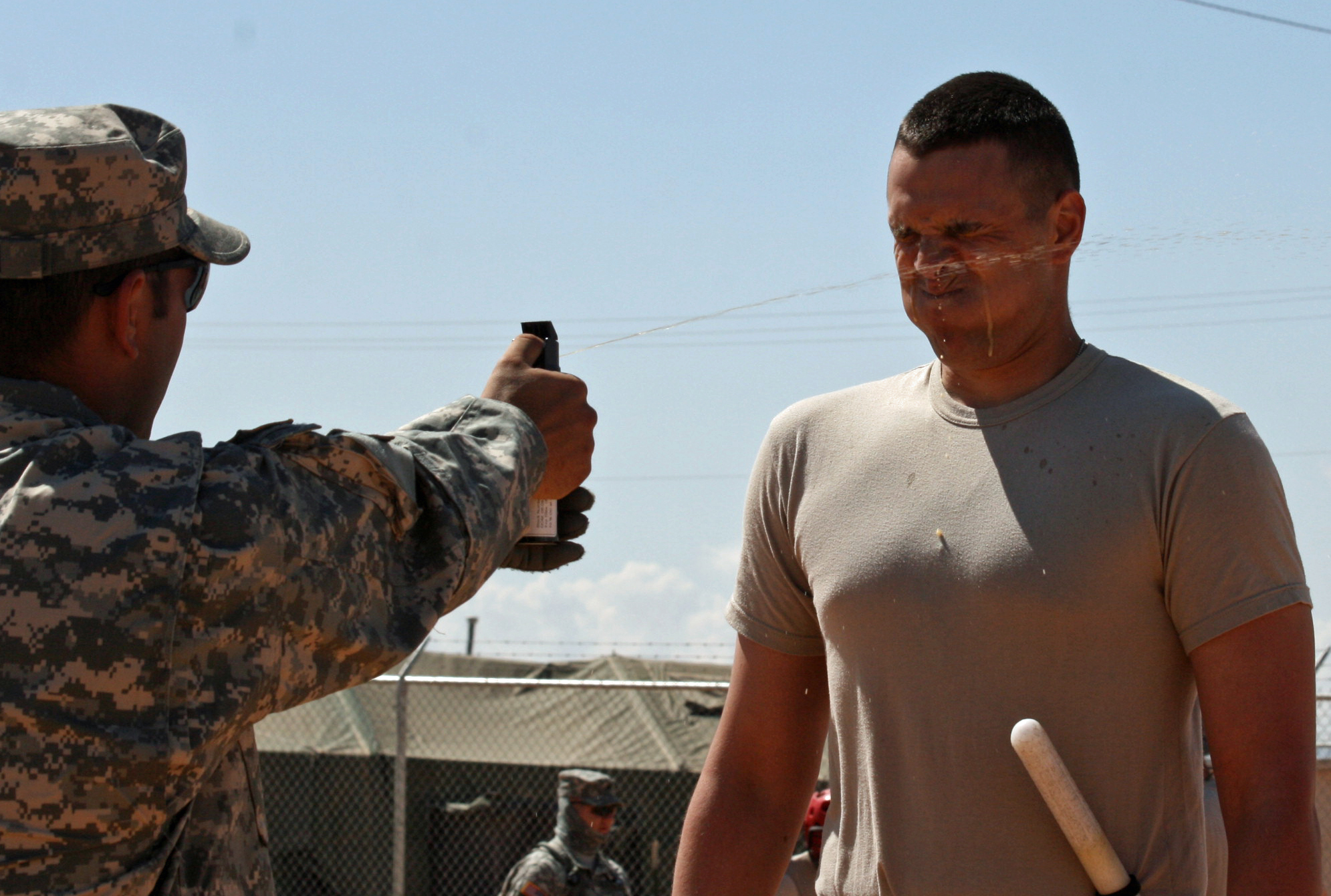
Oleoresin capsicum tear gas being sprayed on a guardsman

== Paprika oleoresin ==
A paprika extract, also known as capsanthin or capsorubin, obtained from the dried fruits of paprika (Capsicum annuum) peppers, primarily used as a coloring agent in foods and, to a lesser extent animal feeds. Also known to be used in the manufacture of cosmetic soaps, a well-known pipe dope, Rectorseal #5, is stated to have an "oleoresinous base".
