= Pimaric acid =

Names
- IUPAC name Pimara-8(14),15-dien-18-oic acid
- Systematic IUPAC name (1R,4aR,4bS,7S,10aR)-7-Ethenyl-1,4a,7-trimethyl-1,2,3,4,4a,4b,5,6,7,9,10,10a-dodecahydrophenanthrene-1-carboxylic acid

Identifiers
CAS Number	127-27-5
3D model (JSmol)	Interactive image
ChemSpider	191072
KEGG	C09159
PubChem CID	220338
UNII	88R98Z71NI
CompTox Dashboard (EPA)	DTXSID80858728
- InChI: InChI=1S/C20H30O2/c1-5-18(2)12-9-15-14(13-18)7-8-16-19(15,3)10-6-11-20(16,4)17(21)22/h5,13,15-16H,1,6-12H2,2-4H3,(H,21,22)/t15-,16+,18+,19+,20+/m0/s1 Key: MHVJRKBZMUDEEV-APQLOABGSA-N; InChI=1/C20H30O2/c1-5-18(2)12-9-15-14(13-18)7-8-16-19(15,3)10-6-11-20(16,4)17(21)22/h5,13,15-16H,1,6-12H2,2-4H3,(H,21,22)/t15-,16+,18+,19+,20+/m0/s1 Key: MHVJRKBZMUDEEV-APQLOABGBB
- SMILES: C[C@]1(CC[C@H]2C(=C1)CC[C@@H]3[C@@]2(CCC[C@@]3(C)C(=O)O)C)C=C

Properties
Chemical formula	C_{20}H_{30}O_{2}
Molar mass	302.458 g·mol^{−1}
- Except where otherwise noted, data are given for materials in their standard state (at 25 °C [77 °F], 100 kPa). verify (what is ?) Infobox references

Pimaric acid is a carboxylic acid that is classified as a resin acid. It is a major component of the rosin obtained from pine trees.

When heated above 100 °C, pimaric acid converts to abietic acid, which it usually accompanies in mixtures like rosin.

It is soluble in alcohols, acetone, and ethers. The compound is colorless, but almost invariably samples are yellow or brown owing to air oxidation. As a mixture with abietic acid, it is often hydrogenated, esterified, or otherwise modified to produce materials of commerce.

Abietic acid is closely related to and more common than pimaric acid, which is an isomer

== See also ==
- Isopimaric acid
