= Resin =

Organic polymer, typically from plants

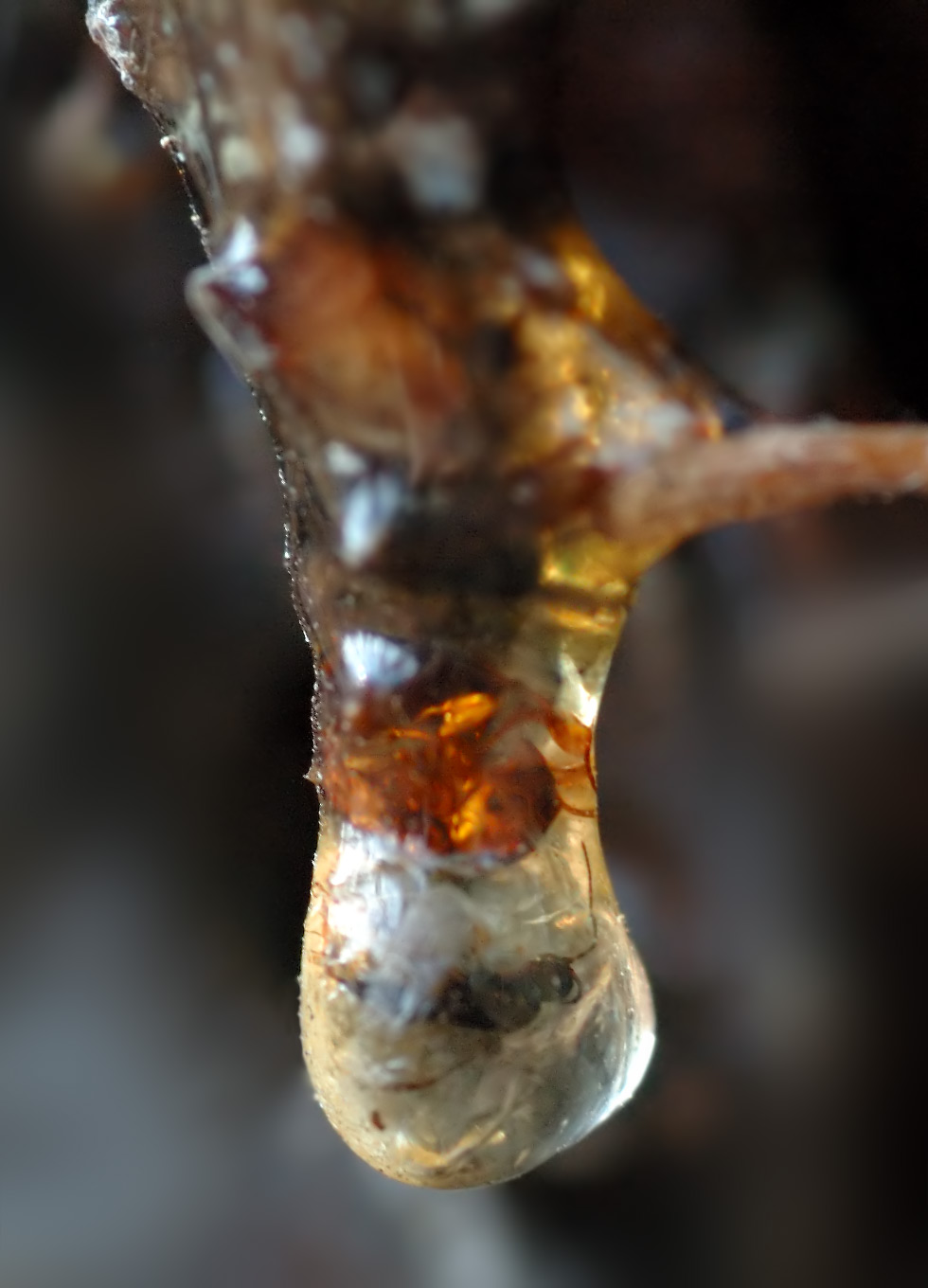
Insect trapped in resin

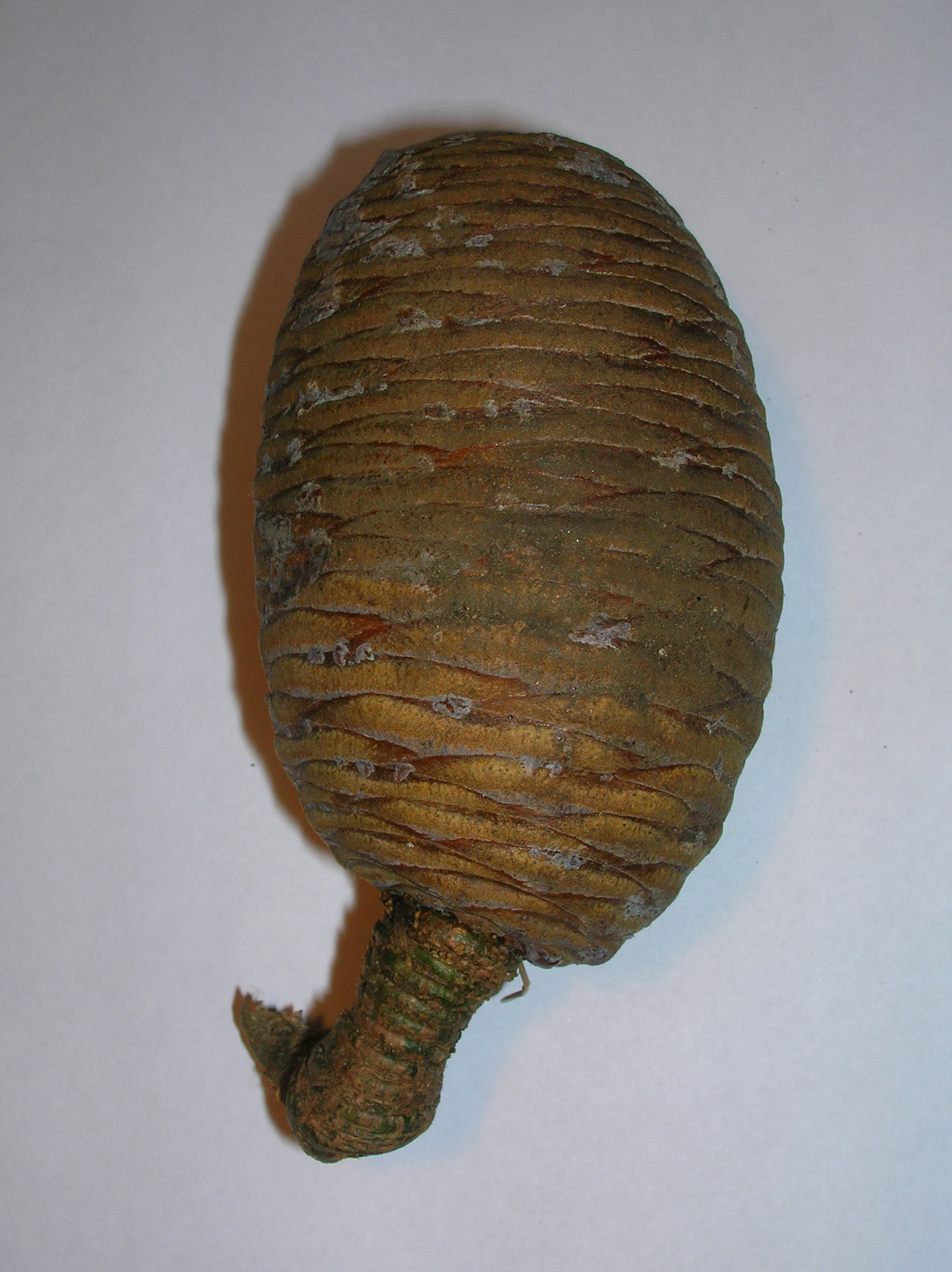
Cedar of Lebanon cone showing flecks of resin as used in the mummification of Egyptian Pharaohs

A resin is a highly viscous liquid or solid that can be converted into a polymer. Resins may be biological or synthetic in origin but are typically harvested from plants. Resins are mixtures of organic compounds insoluble in water, predominantly terpenes. Technically, resins should not be confused with gums, which consist predominantly of water-soluble polysaccharides, although the two terms are often interchangeable in the less formal context. Common resins include pine oleoresins, amber, hashish, frankincense, myrrh, and the animal-derived resin shellac. Resins are used in varnishes, adhesives, food additives, incenses, and perfumes.

Resins protect plants from insects and pathogens and are secreted in response to injury. Resins repel herbivores, insects, and pathogens, while the volatile phenolic compounds may attract benefactors such as predators of insects that attack the plant.

== Composition ==
Most plant resins are composed of terpenes. Specific components are α-pinene, β-pinene, 3-carene, and sabinene, the monocyclic terpenes limonene and terpinolene, and smaller amounts of the tricyclic sesquiterpenes, longifolene, caryophyllene, and cadinene. Some resins also contain a high proportion of resin acids. Rosins on the other hand are less volatile and consist of diterpenes among other compounds.

=== Examples ===
Examples of plant resins include amber, Balm of Gilead, balsam, Canada balsam, copal from trees of Protium copal and Hymenaea courbaril, dammar gum from trees of the family Dipterocarpaceae, dragon's blood from the dragon trees (Dracaena species), elemi, frankincense from Boswellia sacra, galbanum from Ferula gummosa, gum guaicum from the lignum vitae trees of the genus Guaiacum, kauri gum from trees of Agathis australis, hashish (Cannabis resin) from Cannabis indica, labdanum from mediterranean species of Cistus, mastic (plant resin) from the mastic tree Pistacia lentiscus, myrrh from shrubs of Commiphora, sandarac resin from Tetraclinis articulata, the national tree of Malta, styrax (a Benzoin resin from various Styrax species) and spinifex resin from Australian grasses.

Amber is fossil resin (also called resinite) from coniferous and other tree species. Copal, kauri gum, dammar and other resins may also be found as subfossil deposits. Subfossil copal can be distinguished from genuine fossil amber because it becomes tacky when a drop of a solvent such as acetone or chloroform is placed on it. African copal and the kauri gum of New Zealand are also procured in a semi-fossil condition.

=== Rosin ===
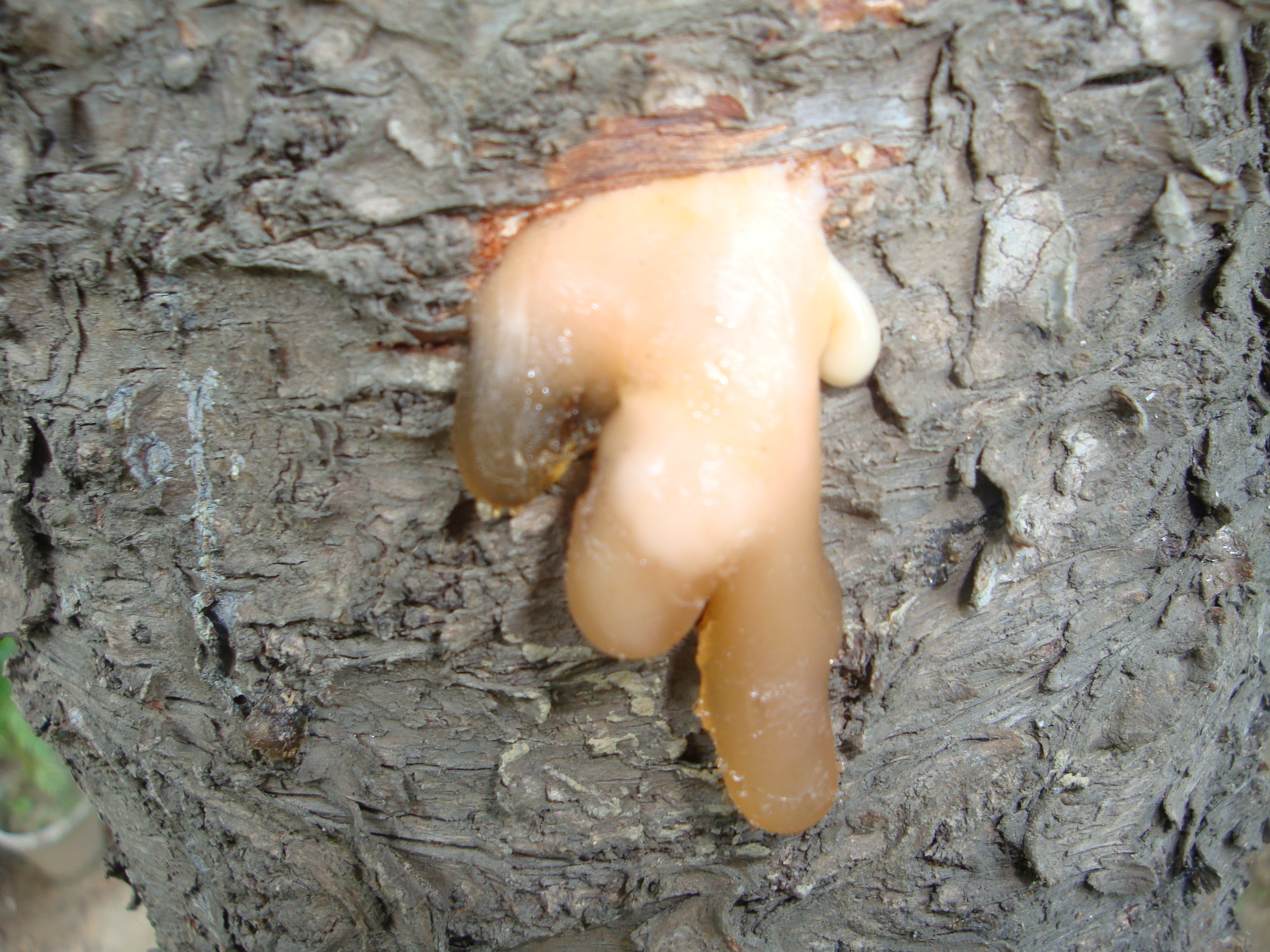
Extremely viscous resin extruding from the trunk of a mature Araucaria columnaris

Rosin is a solidified resin from which the volatile terpenes have been removed by distillation. Typical rosin is a transparent or translucent mass, with a vitreous fracture and a faintly yellow or brown colour, non-odorous or having only a slight turpentine odour and taste. Rosin is insoluble in water and mostly soluble in alcohol, essential oils, ether, and hot fatty oils. Rosin softens and melts when heated and burns with a bright but smoky flame.

Rosin consists of a complex mixture of different substances including organic acids named the resin acids. Related to the terpenes, resin acid is oxidized terpenes. Resin acids dissolve in alkalis to form resin soaps, from which the resin acids are regenerated upon treatment with acids. Examples of resin acids are abietic acid (sylvic acid), C_{20}H_{30}O_{2}, plicatic acid contained in cedar, and pimaric acid, C_{20}H_{30}O_{2}, a constituent of galipot resin. Abietic acid can also be extracted from rosin by means of hot alcohol.

Rosin is obtained from pines and some other plants, mostly conifers. Plant resins are generally produced as stem secretions, but in some Central and South American species of Dalechampia and Clusia they are produced as pollination rewards, and used by some stingless bee species in nest construction. Propolis, consisting largely of resins collected from plants such as poplars and conifers, is used by honey bees to seal small gaps in their hives, while larger gaps are filled with beeswax.

=== Petroleum- and insect-derived resins ===
Shellac is an example of an insect-derived resin.

Asphaltite and Utah resin are petroleum bitumens.

== History and etymology ==
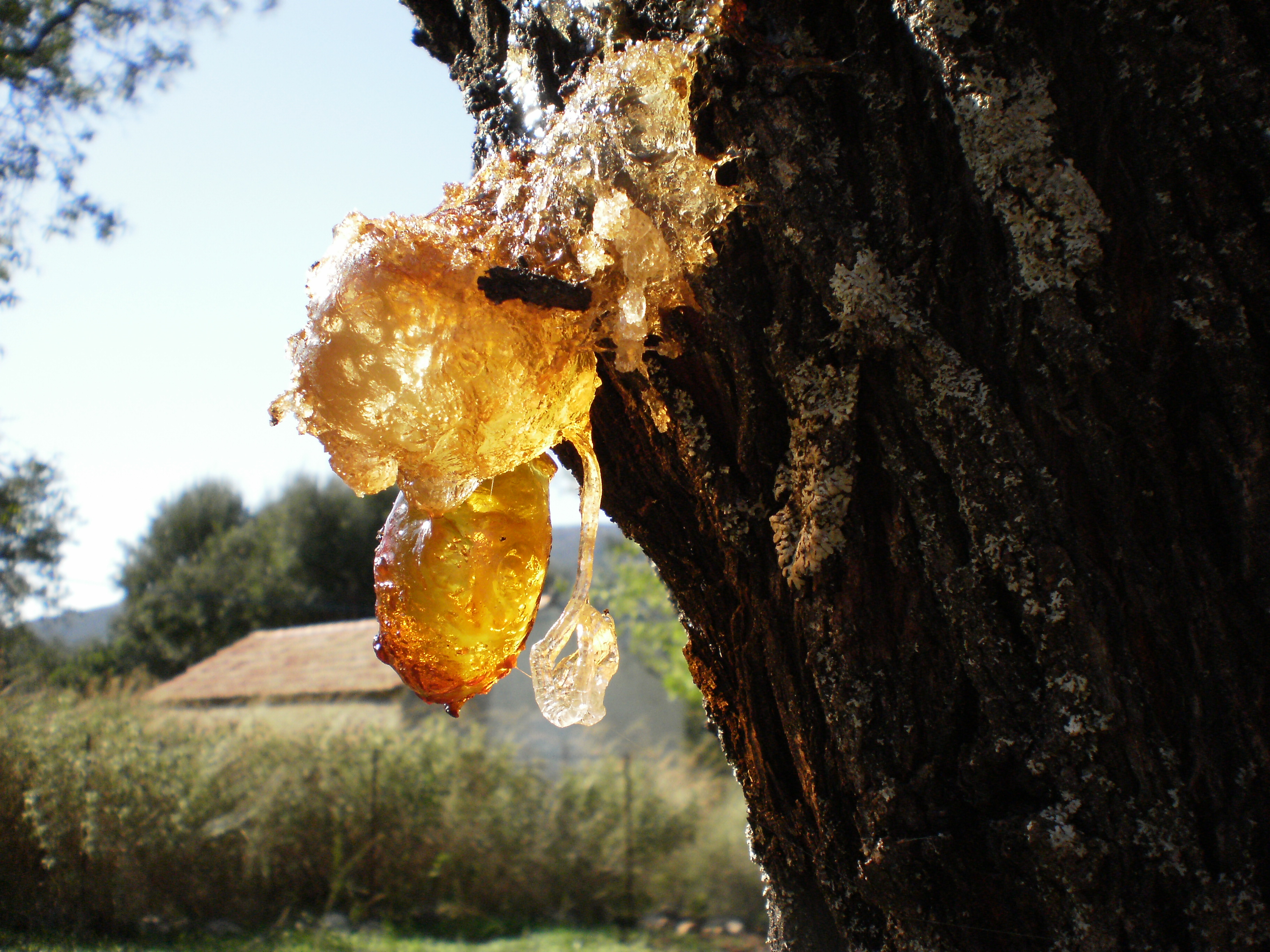
The material dripping from an almond tree looks confusingly like resin, but actually is a gum or mucilage, and chemically very different.

Human use of plant resins has a long history that was documented in ancient Greece by Theophrastus, in ancient Rome by Pliny the Elder, and especially in the resins known as frankincense and myrrh, prized in ancient Egypt. These were highly prized substances, and required as incense in some religious rites.

The word resin comes from French resine, from Latin resina "resin", which either derives from or is a cognate of the Greek ῥητίνη rhētínē "resin of the pine", of unknown earlier origin, though probably non-Indo-European.

The word "resin" has been applied in the modern world to nearly any component of a liquid that will set into a hard lacquer or enamel-like finish. An example is nail polish. Certain "casting resins" and synthetic resins (such as epoxy resin) have also been given the name "resin".

Some naturally derived resins, when soft, are known as 'oleoresins', and when containing benzoic acid or cinnamic acid they are called balsams. Oleoresins are naturally occurring mixtures of an oil and a resin; they can be extracted from various plants. Other resinous products in their natural condition are a mix with gum or mucilaginous substances and known as gum resins. Several natural resins are used as ingredients in perfumes, e.g., balsams of Peru and tolu, elemi, styrax, and certain turpentines.

=== Non-resinous exudates ===
Other liquid compounds found inside plants or exuded by plants, such as sap, latex, or mucilage, are sometimes confused with resin but are not the same. Saps, in particular, serve a nutritive function that resins do not.

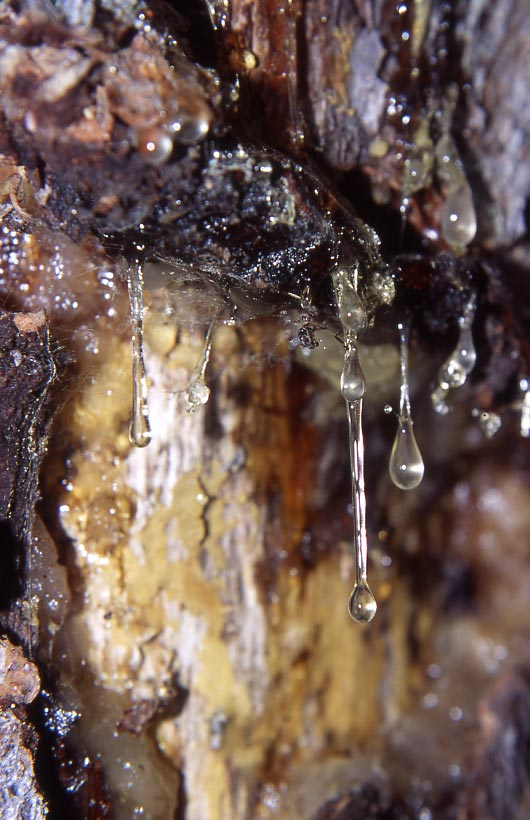
Resin of pine

== Uses ==
=== Plant resins ===
Plant resins are valued for the production of varnishes, adhesives, and food glazing agents. They are also prized as raw materials for the synthesis of other organic compounds and provide constituents of incense and perfume. The oldest known use of plant resin comes from the late Middle Stone Age in Southern Africa where it was used as an adhesive for hafting stone tools.

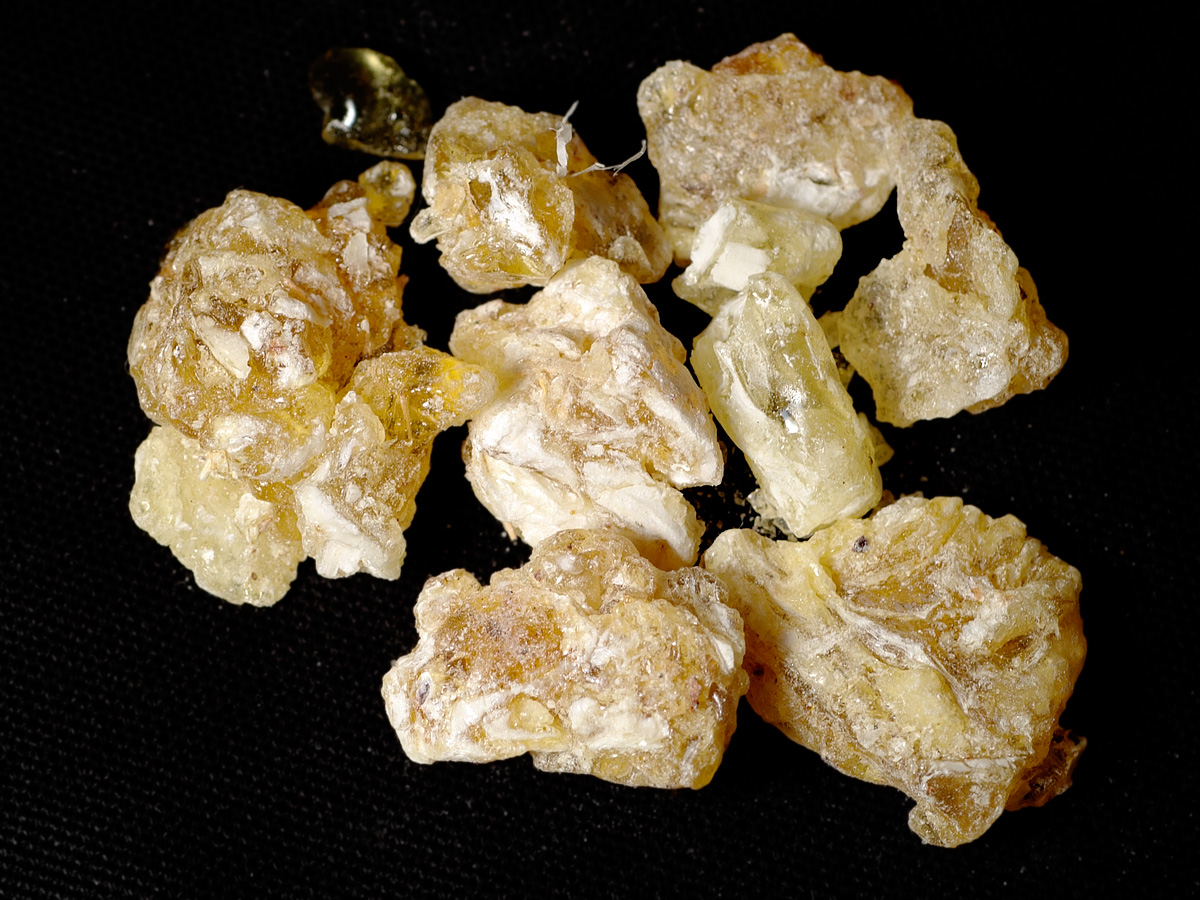
Lumps of dried frankincense resin

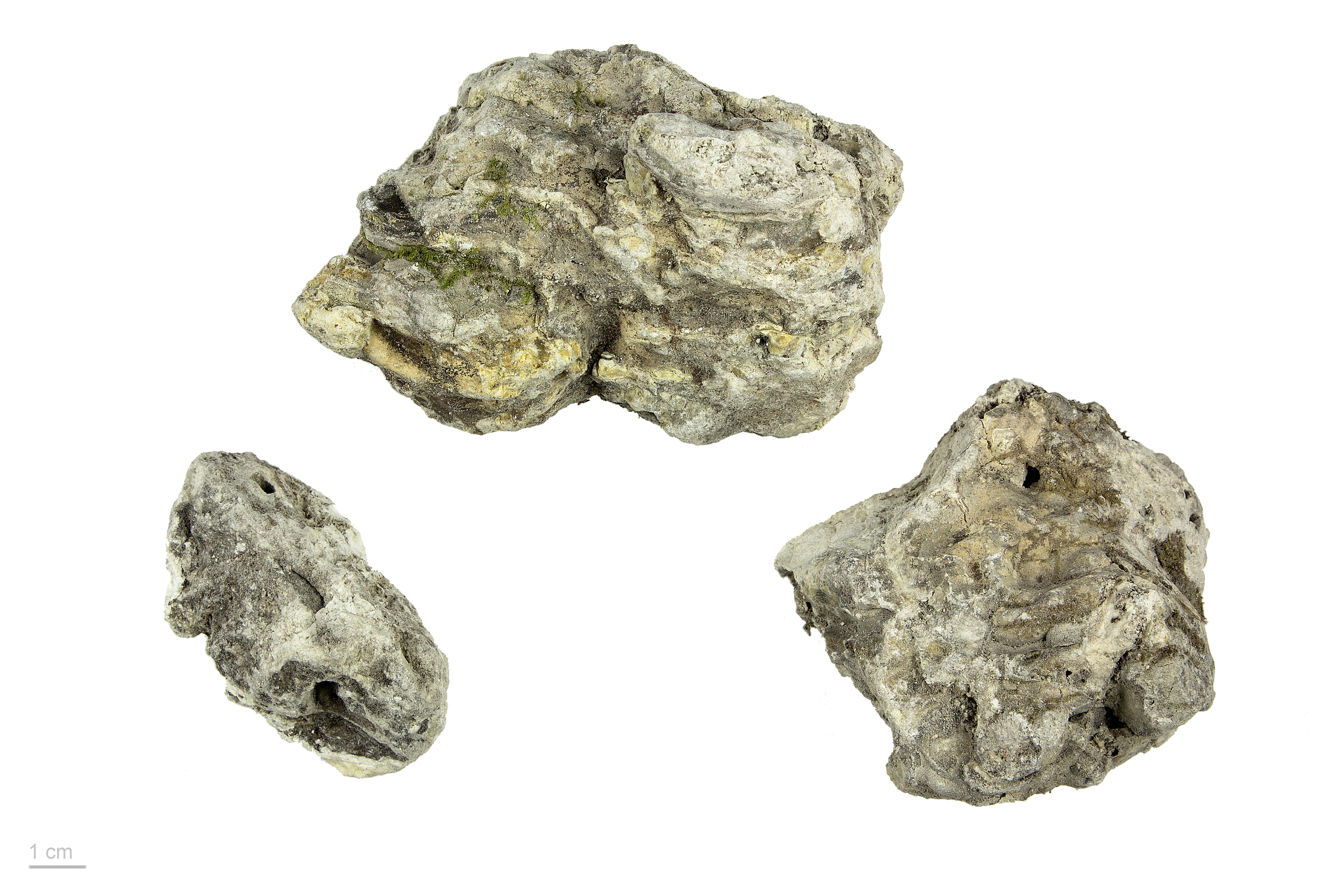
Caranna, a hard, brittle, resinous gum from species of Protium

The hard transparent resins, such as the copals, dammars, mastic, and sandarac, are principally used for varnishes and adhesives, while the softer odoriferous oleo-resins (frankincense, elemi, turpentine, copaiba), and gum resins containing essential oils (ammoniacum, asafoetida, gamboge, myrrh, and scammony) are more used for food and incense. The resin of the Aleppo pine is used to flavor retsina, a Greek resinated wine. The resin of Norway spruce (Picea abies) has been used in Nordic folk medicine for treating wounds and skin conditions.

=== Animal resins ===
While animal resins are not as common as either plant or synthetic resins, some animal resins, like lac (obtained from Kerria lacca), are used for applications like sealing wax in India and lacquerware in Sri Lanka.

=== Synthetic resins ===
Many materials are produced via the conversion of synthetic resins to solids, such as bisphenol A diglycidyl ether – a resin converted to epoxy glue upon the addition of a hardener. Silicones are often prepared from silicone resins via room temperature vulcanization. Alkyd resins are used in paints and varnishes and harden or cure by exposure to oxygen in the air.

== See also ==
- Amber – Fossilized tree resin
- Balsam of Peru – Type of tree balsam
- Kino (gum) – Plant exudate
- Mastic (plant resin) – Resin traditionally obtained from the mastic tree on the island of Chios
- Pitch (resin) – Natural or manufactured resin
- Polyresin – Synthetic materials with properties similar to natural resins
- Resin casting – Method of plastic casting
- Resin extraction – Process of collecting sap or resin from pine trees
