= Resin acid =

Mixture of acids found in tree resins

Resin acid refers to any of several related carboxylic acids found in tree resins. Nearly all resin acids have the same basic skeleton: three fused rings having the empirical formula C_{19}H_{29}CO_{2}H. Resin acids occur in nature as tacky, yellowish gums consisting of several compounds. They are water-insoluble. A common resin acid is abietic acid. Resin acids are used to produce soaps for diverse applications, but their use is being displaced increasingly by synthetic acids such as 2-ethylhexanoic acid or petroleum-derived naphthenic acids.

== Botanical analysis ==
Resin acids are protectants and wood preservatives that are produced by parenchymatous epithelial cells that surround the resin ducts in trees from temperate coniferous forests. The resin acids are formed when two-carbon and three-carbon molecules couple with isoprene building units to form monoterpenes (volatile), sesquiterpenes (volatile), and diterpenes (nonvolatile) structures.

Pines contain numerous vertical and radial resin ducts scattered throughout the entire wood. The accumulation of resin in the heartwood and resin ducts causes a maximum concentration in the base of the older trees. Resin in the sapwood, however, is less at the base of the tree and increases with height.

In 2005, as an infestation of the Mountain pine beetle (Dendroctonus ponderosae) and blue stain fungus devastated the Lodgepole Pine forests of northern interior British Columbia, Canada, resin acid levels three to four times greater than normal were detected in infected trees, prior to death. These increased levels show that a tree uses the resins as a defense. Resins are both toxic to the beetle and the fungus and also can entomb the beetle in diterpene remains from secretions. Increasing resin production has been proposed as a way to slow the spread of the beetle in the "Red Zone" or the wildlife urban interface.

== Chemical components ==
=== Biosynthesis and isolation ===
Resin acids originate from geranylgeranyl pyrophosphate, which is acted on (i.e., the substrate for) by copalyl diphosphate synthase. The initial conversion gives copalyl diphosphate, the progenitor of the diterpene diphosphates (nomenclature warning: pyrophosphate and diphosphate are often used interchangeably). Under enzymatic control, this pyrophosphate compound rearranges into the following diterpenes: levopimaradiene, abietadiene, neoabietadiene. Traces of three other diterpenes are also generated: palustradiene, sandaracopimaradiene, and pimara-8(14),15-diene. These hydrocarbons are substrates for cytochrome P450, which introduces oxygen functionalities, i.e. converts C-H bonds to C-OH bonds and similar reactions involving oxygen in air. This conversion turn terpenes into terpenoids.

Several important resin acids can be identified in rosin, as listed below. The two classes, abietic acids and pimaric acids, are isomers with the formula C_{19}H_{29}CO_{2}H.

=== Abietic-type acids ===
The diterpenoid abietic acid, a common resin acid.

- Represents the majority 85-90% of typical tall oil.
- abietic acid
  - abieta-7,13-dien-18-oic acid
  - 13-isopropylpodocarpa -7,13-dien-15-oic acid
- Neoabietic acid
- Dehydroabietic acid
- Palustric acid
- Levopimaric acid

=== Pimaric-type acids ===
The diterpenoid pimaric acid, a common resin acid.

- pimaric acid
  - pimara-8(14),15-dien-18-oic acid
- isopimaric acids

=== Others ===
- agathic acid
- isocupressic acid
- trans-communic acid

== Production in tall oil (chemical pulping byproduct) ==
The commercial manufacture of wood pulp grade chemical cellulose using the kraft chemical pulping processes releases resin acids. The Kraft process is conducted under strongly alkaline conditions of sodium hydroxide, sodium sulfide, and sodium hydrosulfide. These bases neutralize resin acids, converting them to their respective sodium salts, sodium abietate, ((CH_{3})_{4}C_{15}H_{17}COONa), sodium pimarate ((CH_{3})_{3}(CH_{2})C_{15}H_{23}COONa) and so on. In this form, the sodium salts are poorly insoluble and, being of lower density than the spent pulping process liquor, float to the surface of storage vessels during the process of concentration, as a somewhat gelatinous pasty yellow fluid called kraft soap (also called resin soap). This soap is used in bleaching and cleaning and as a compound in some varnishes. It also finds use in rubber industry as an emulsifier. Often the soap is pretreated with formaldehyde and maleic anhydride. Pine soap is refined from resin soap via tall oil by acidification, refining and resaponification.

Kraft soap can be reneutralized with sulfuric acid to restore the acidic forms abietic acid, palmitic acid, and related resin acid components. This refined mixture is called tall oil. Other major components include fatty acids and unsaponifiable sterols.

Resin acids, because of the same protectant nature they provide in the trees where they originate, also impose toxic implications on the effluent treatment facilities in pulp manufacturing plants. Furthermore, any residual resin acids that pass the treatment facilities add toxicity to the stream discharged to the receiving waters.

== Variation with species and biogeoclimatic zone ==
The chemical composition of tall oil varies with the species of trees used in pulping, and in turn with geographical location. For example, the coastal areas of the southeastern United States have a high proportion of slash pine (Pinus elliottii); inland areas of the same region have a preponderance of Loblolly Pine (Pinus taeda). Slash pine generally contains a higher concentration of resin acids than loblolly pine.

In general, the tall oil produced in coastal areas of the southeastern United States contains over 40% resin acids and sometimes as much as 50% or more. The fatty acids fraction is usually lower than the resin acids, and unsaponifiables amount to 6-8%. Farther north in Virginia, where Pitch Pine (Pinus rigida)and Shortleaf Pine (Pinus echinata) are more dominant, the resin acid content decreases to as low as 30-35% with a corresponding increase in the fatty acids present.

In Canada, where mills process Lodgepole Pine (Pinus contorta) in interior British Columbia and Alberta, Jack Pine (Pinus banksiana), Alberta to Quebec and Eastern White Pine (Pinus strobus) and Red Pine (Pinus resinosa), Ontario to New Brunswick, resin acid levels of 25% are common with unsaponifiable contents of 12-25%. Similar variations may be found in other parts of the United States and in other countries. For example, in Finland, Sweden and Russia, resin acid values from Scots Pine (Pinus sylvestris) may vary from 20 to 50%, fatty acids from 35 to 70%, and unsaponifiables from 6 to 30%.

== Uses ==
Resin acids are converted into ester gum by reaction with controlled amounts of glycerol or other polyhydric alcohols.

Some have drying properties, and as ester gum is used in paints, varnishes, and lacquers.

Resin acids are converted to resin soaps.

== Safety ==
Resin acids are very poorly soluble in water (milligrams per liter) and have low acute toxicity.
