= Abietic acid =

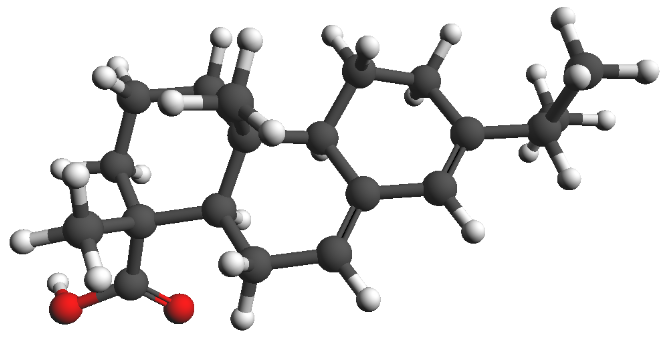

Names
- IUPAC name Abieta-7,13-dien-18-oic acid
- Systematic IUPAC name (1R,4aR,4bR,10aR)-1,4a-Dimethyl-7-(propan-2-yl)-1,2,3,4,4a,4b,5,6,10,10a-decahydrophenanthrene-1-carboxylic acid
- Other names Abietinic acid; Sylvic acid

Identifiers
CAS Number	514-10-3
3D model (JSmol)	Interactive image
ChEBI	CHEBI:28987
ChEMBL	ChEMBL71893
ChemSpider	10127
ECHA InfoCard	100.007.436
EC Number	208-173-3
KEGG	C06087
PubChem CID	10569
RTECS number	TP8580000
UNII	V3DHX33184
CompTox Dashboard (EPA)	DTXSID7022047
- InChI: InChI=1S/C20H30O2/c1-13(2)14-6-8-16-15(12-14)7-9-17-19(16,3)10-5-11-20(17,4)18(21)22/h7,12-13,16-17H,5-6,8-11H2,1-4H3,(H,21,22)/t16-,17+,19+,20+/m0/s1 Key: RSWGJHLUYNHPMX-ONCXSQPRSA-N; InChI=1/C20H30O2/c1-13(2)14-6-8-16-15(12-14)7-9-17-19(16,3)10-5-11-20(17,4)18(21)22/h7,12-13,16-17H,5-6,8-11H2,1-4H3,(H,21,22)/t16-,17+,19+,20+/m0/s1 Key: RSWGJHLUYNHPMX-ONCXSQPRBK
- SMILES: O=C(O)[C@]3([C@@H]2C/C=C1/C=C(\CC[C@@H]1[C@@]2(C)CCC3)C(C)C)C

Properties
Chemical formula	C_{20}H_{30}O_{2}
Molar mass	302.458 g·mol^{−1}
Appearance	Colorless solid
Density	1.06 g/mL
Melting point	172–175 °C (342–347 °F; 445–448 K)
Solubility in water	Insoluble
Solubility in other solvents	Very soluble in acetone, petroleum ether, Et_{2}O, and ethanol

Hazards
- Occupational safety and health (OHS/OSH)
Main hazards	Irritant
- GHS labelling
Pictograms	(GHS07: Exclamation mark)
Signal word	Warning
Hazard statements	H317
Precautionary statements	P261, P272, P280, P302+P352, P321, P333+P313, P363, P501
NFPA 704 (fire diamond)	1 0 0
Safety data sheet (SDS)	MSDS
- Except where otherwise noted, data are given for materials in their standard state (at 25 °C [77 °F], 100 kPa). verify (what is ?) Infobox references

Abietic acid (also known as abietinic acid or sylvic acid) is a diterpenoid found in coniferous trees. It is supposed to exist to defend the host plant from insect attack or various wounds. Chemically, it is a complicated molecule featuring two alkene groups and a carboxylic acid within a chiral tricyclic framework. As the major component of rosin, it is commercially important. Historically speaking, it was a major component of naval stores. It is the most common of the resin acids. Another common resin acid is pimaric acid, which converts to abietic acid upon heating.

== Characteristics and occurrence ==
Abietic acid is found in rosin obtained from pine trees. Pure abietic acid is a colorless solid, but commercial samples are usually a glassy or partly crystalline yellowish solid that melts at temperatures as low as 85 °C (185 °F). Abietic acid is soluble in alcohols, acetone, and ethers. Its esters and salts are called an abietates, e.g. ethyl abietate and sodium abietate.

The ancient presence of abietic acid (and other resin acids), being abundant and resilient, can be inferred by analysis of rocks and archeological samples. Through the process of diagenesis, abietic acid changes into a collection of simpler compounds called abietanes.

== Biosynthesis ==
Route from copalyl pyrophosphate to abietadiene, precursor to abietic acid (PP = pyrophosphate).

Abietic acid is derived from the diterpene abietadiene, which in turn is made from copalyl pyrophosphate (CPP), which is derived from geranylgeranyl pyrophosphate ( GGPP), the precursor to many diterpenoids. In air and in the presence of certain cytochrome P450 enzymes, abietadiene is oxidized to abietic acid. An entire family of so-called resin acids form similarly. Together with abietic acid, these resin acids are a major portion of rosin, the solid portion of the oleoresin of coniferous trees.

Abietenes are synthesized from geranylgeranyl diphosphate via a copalyl diphosphate intermediate by class 2 diterpene cyclases and class 1 diterpene syntheses.

The conformation of the GGPP molecule dictates the stereochemistry of the CPP intermediate after cyclization. The stereochemistry of the typical abietane skeleton suggests a GGPP precursor with its fused cyclohexyl rings in a chair-chair ("normal") conformation, although some abietanes with alternative stereochemistry may be cyclized from CCP isomers containing alternative combinations of boat and chair cyclohexane conformers. After the initial cyclization to CPP, which forms rings A and B in the abietane skeleton, the C ring is formed with the help of a class I diterpene synthase enzyme. Subsequent methyl migration and dehydrogenation steps yield the abietene isomers.

== Preparation ==
Abietic acid is extracted from tree rosin. Laboratory procedures illustrate the nature of the extraction, which is the basis of a substantial industry, formerly known as naval stores.

== Uses ==
As a component of rosin and one of the principal resin acids, abietic acid has many uses, e.g., in some paints, soaps, foods, and soldering flux.

Some research has shown that abetic acid may reduce emesis, lung injury, osteoporosis, hyperuricemia, pain, and diabetic nephropathy, primarily through modulation of key signaling pathways and molecular targets.

== Safety ==
- Abietic acid is considered a "nonhazardous natural substance" in tall oil ("liquid rosin").
- In the U.S., abietic acid is listed in the inventory of the Toxic Substances Control Act.
- Abietic acid is the primary irritant in pine wood and resin. As a contact allergen it is the cause of abietic acid dermatitis. (However, compounds resulting from its oxidation by air elicit stronger responses.)
- 50% ethanol extracts from Resina pini of Pinus sp. (Pinaceae) showed inhibitory activity against testosterone 5α-reductase prepared from rat prostate. The fraction responsible for this activity was purified, and the active constituent was isolated and identified as abietic acid, which exhibited potent inhibitory activity against testosterone 5α-reductase in vitro.
