= C20H32 =

The molecular formula C_{20}H_{32} (molar mass: 272.47 g/mol) may refer to:

- β-Araneosene, a diterpene
- Cembrene A, a diterpene
- Elisabethatriene, a bicyclic compound
- Laurenene, a diterpene
- Sclarene, a diterpene
- Stemarene, a diterpene
- Stemodene, a diterpene
- Taxadiene, a taxane diterpene
