= Phorbol-diester hydrolase =

Class of enzymes

Identifiers
- EC no.: 3.1.1.51
- CAS no.: 81181-74-0

Databases
- BRENDA: enzyme data
- ExPASy: NiceZyme view
- KEGG: enzyme entry
- MetaCyc: metabolic pathway
- Rhea: reactions
- PDB structures: RCSB PDB PDBe PDBsum
- Gene Ontology: AmiGO / QuickGO
Search
- PMC: articles
- PubMed: articles
- NCBI: proteins

Phorbol-diester hydrolase (EC 3.1.1.51) is an enzyme that catalyzes the reaction

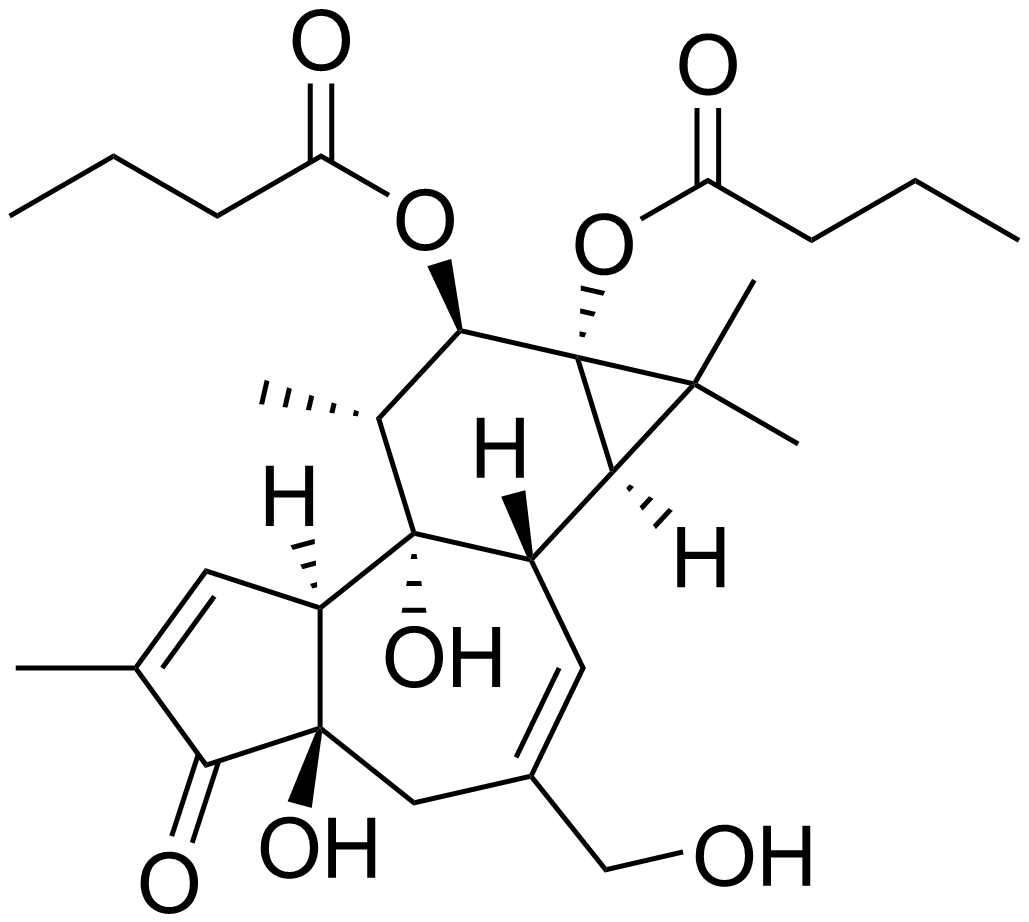
phorbol 12,13-dibutyrate
H_{2}O
phorbol 13-butanoate
+
butyric acid

The enzyme characterised from murine liver hydrolyses the diterpenoid, phorbol 12,13-dibutyrate, to remove one specific butyrate ester, giving phorbol 13-butanoate and butyric acid. It also acts on 12-O-tetradecanoylphorbol-13-acetate. Such phorbol diesters from croton oil are tumor promoters, so this reaction inactivates them.

This enzyme is a hydrolase, specifically one acting on carboxylic ester bonds. The systematic name is 12,13-diacylphorbate 12-acylhydrolase. Other names in common use include diacylphorbate 12-hydrolase, diacylphorbate 12-hydrolase, phorbol-12,13-diester 12-ester hydrolase, and PDEH.
