= Phorbol 12,13-dibutyrate =

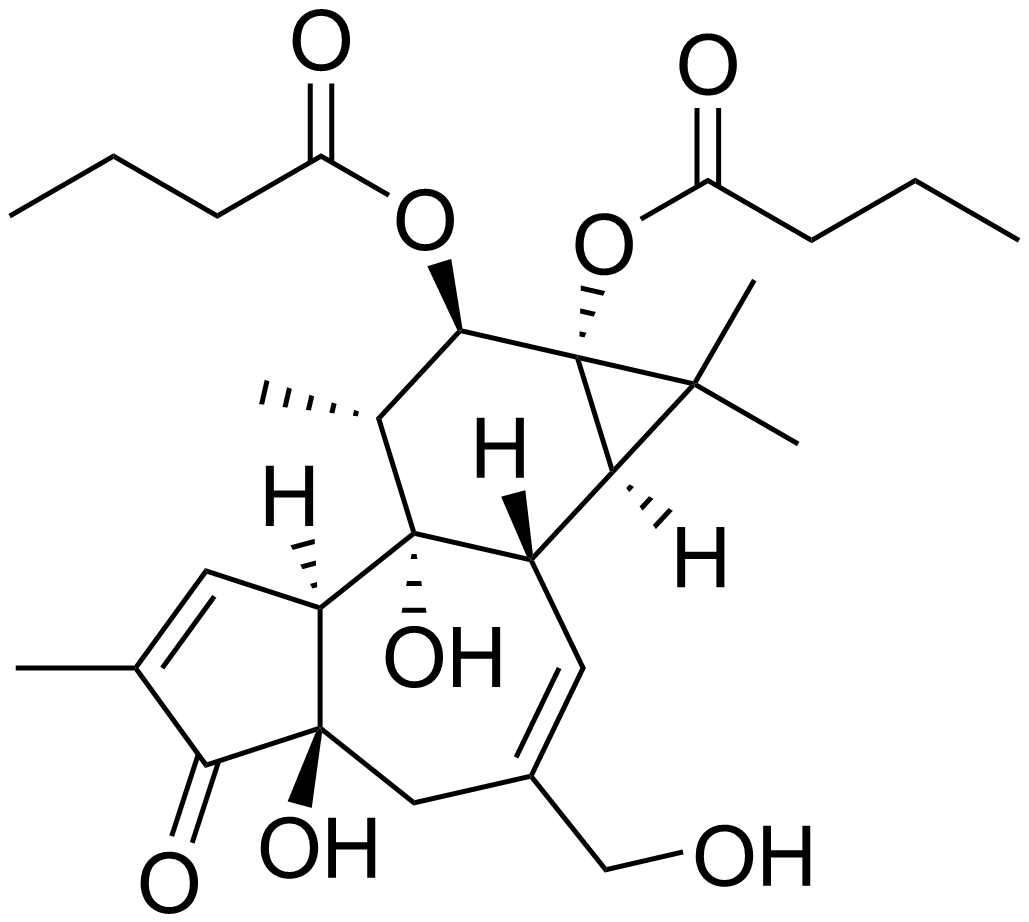

Names
- Preferred IUPAC name (1aR,1bS,4aR,7aS,7bS,8R,9R,9aS)-4a,7b-Dihydroxy-3-(hydroxymethyl)-1,1,6,8-tetramethyl-5-oxo-1,1a,1b,4,4a,5,7a,7b,8,9-decahydro-9aH-cyclopropa[3,4]benzo[1,2-e]azulene-9,9a-diyl dibutanoate
- Other names Phorbol dibutyrate; Phorbol 12,13-dibutanoate

Identifiers
CAS Number	37558-16-0
3D model (JSmol)	Interactive image
Abbreviations	PDBu
ChEBI	CHEBI:17598
ChemSpider	34645
ECHA InfoCard	100.164.231
KEGG	C03634
PubChem CID	37783
UNII	67MX82CL58
CompTox Dashboard (EPA)	DTXSID50958628
- InChI: InChI=1S/C28H40O8/c1-7-9-20(30)35-24-16(4)27(34)18(22-25(5,6)28(22,24)36-21(31)10-8-2)12-17(14-29)13-26(33)19(27)11-15(3)23(26)32/h11-12,16,18-19,22,24,29,33-34H,7-10,13-14H2,1-6H3/t16-,18+,19-,22-,24-,26-,27-,28-/m1/s1 Key: BQJRUJTZSGYBEZ-YVQNUNKESA-N
- SMILES: CCCC(=O)O[C@@H]1[C@H]([C@]2([C@@H](C=C(C[C@]3([C@H]2C=C(C3=O)C)O)CO)[C@H]4[C@@]1(C4(C)C)OC(=O)CCC)O)C

Properties
Chemical formula	C_{28}H_{40}O_{8}
Molar mass	504.620 g·mol^{−1}
- Except where otherwise noted, data are given for materials in their standard state (at 25 °C [77 °F], 100 kPa). Infobox references

Phorbol 12,13-dibutyrate (PDBu) is a phorbol ester which is one of the constituents of croton oil. As an activator of protein kinase C, it is a weak tumor promoter compared to 12-O-tetradecanoylphorbol-13-acetate.

Tritiated PDBu has been used to study the way that phorbol esters bind to the protein kinase C receptor.

== Metabolism ==
The enzyme phorbol-diester hydrolase originally characterised from murine liver hydrolyses PDBu to remove one specific butyrate ester, giving phorbol 13-butanoate and butyric acid. It also acts on 12-O-tetradecanoylphorbol-13-acetate.

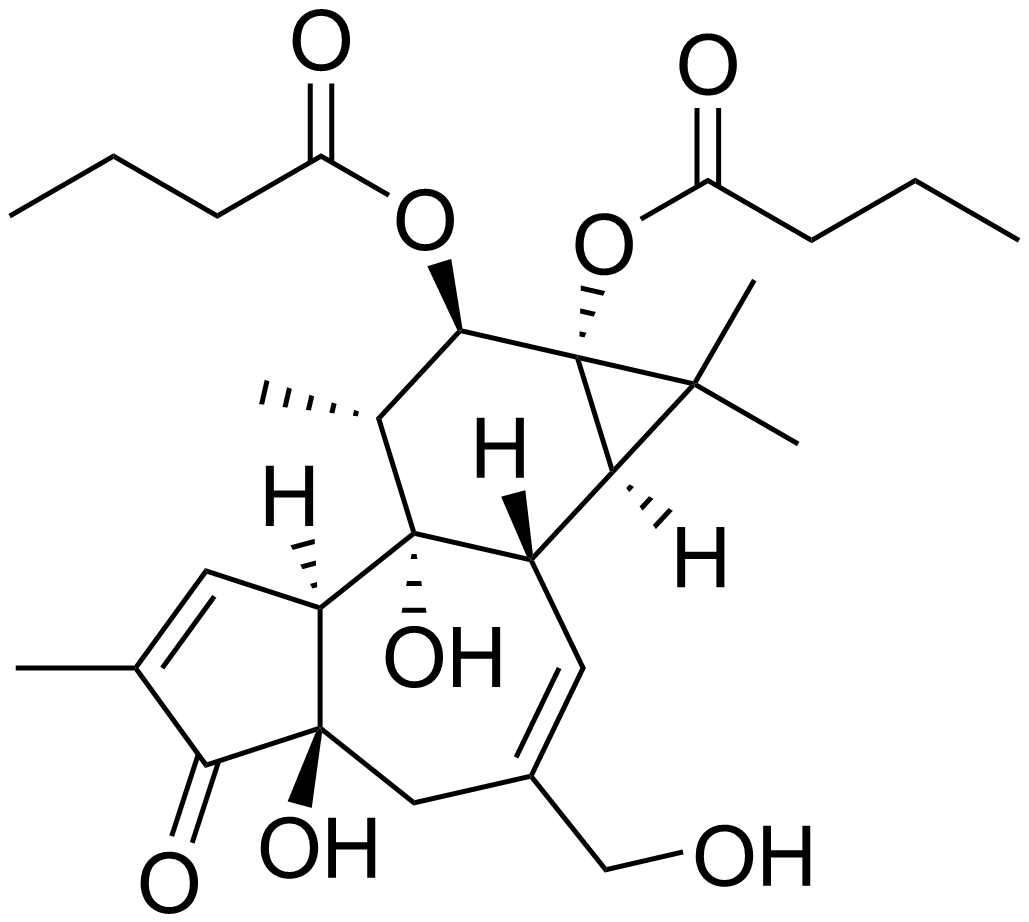
PDBu
H_{2}O
phorbol 13-butanoate
+
butyric acid

Only phorbol diesters are tumor promoters, so this reaction inactivates them.
