= Taxuspines =

Class of taxanes

Taxuspines is a class of taxanes, which are encountered in several species of the genus Taxus.

Taxuspine A

Taxuspine B

Typically, they are several types of them, named as taxuspines A ~ H and J. These new taxoids recently have been discovered in the Japanese yew, Taxus cuspidata. Taxuspines E ~ H and J (1 ~ 5), have been isolated from stems and leaves of the Japanese yew Taxus cuspidata Sieb. et Zucc.

Taxuspine E (1) exhibited potent cytotoxicity against KB cells.

== See also ==
- Docetaxel
- Taxane
- Taxuyunnanine
