= C28H40O8 =

The molecular formula C_{28}H_{40}O_{8} (molar mass: 504.61 g/mol, exact mass: 504.2723 u) may refer to:

- Phorbol 12,13-dibutyrate (PDBu)
- Taxusin
