= Tigliane =

Names
- Preferred IUPAC name (1aS,1bR,3S,4aS,6R,7aR,7bR,8R,9aR)-1,1,3,6,8-pentamethyltetradecahydro-1H-cyclopropa[3,4]benzo[1,2-e]azulene
- Other names Tiglian

Identifiers
CAS Number	67707-87-3
3D model (JSmol)	Interactive image
ChEBI	CHEBI:37526
ChemSpider	136551
PubChem CID	154992
CompTox Dashboard (EPA)	DTXSID50987054
- InChI: InChI=1S/C20H34/c1-11-6-14-7-12(2)9-16-18(15(14)8-11)13(3)10-17-19(16)20(17,4)5/h11-19H,6-10H2,1-5H3/t11-,12+,13-,14+,15-,16-,17-,18-,19+/m1/s1 Key: CGVXVPQJMYMMIH-HKDZDBKOSA-N
- SMILES: C[C@@H]1C[C@H]2C[C@@H](C[C@@H]3[C@@H]([C@@H]2C1)[C@@H](C[C@@H]4[C@H]3C4(C)C)C)C

Properties
Chemical formula	C_{20}H_{34}
Molar mass	274.492 g·mol^{−1}
- Except where otherwise noted, data are given for materials in their standard state (at 25 °C [77 °F], 100 kPa). (what is ?) Infobox references

Tigliane is a diterpene that forms the structural basis for some natural chemical compounds such as phorbol.

== See also ==
- Abietane
- Labdane
- Ingenane
- Phorbol esters
- Tigilanol tiglate
