= Cabazitaxel =

Chemical compound

Clinical data
- Trade names: Jevtana
- Other names: XRP-6258
- AHFS/Drugs.com: Monograph
- MedlinePlus: a611009
- License data: US DailyMed: Cabazitaxel
- Pregnancy category: AU: D
- Routes of administration: Intravenous
- ATC code: L01CD04 (WHO)

Legal status
- Legal status: AU: S4 (Prescription only); CA: ℞-only; UK: POM (Prescription only); US: ℞-only; EU: Rx-only

Identifiers
- IUPAC name: (1S,2S,3R,4S,7R,9S,10S,12R,15S)-4-(Acetyloxy)-15-{[(2R,3S)-3-{[(tert-butoxy)carbonyl]amino}-2-hydroxy-3-phenylpropanoyl]oxy}-1-hydroxy-9,12-dimethoxy-10,14,17,17-tetramethyl-11-oxo-6-oxatetracyclo[11.3.1.0^{3,10}.0^{4,7}]heptadec-13-en-2-yl benzoate
- CAS Number: 183133-96-2
- PubChem CID: 9854073
- IUPHAR/BPS: 6798
- DrugBank: DB06772
- ChemSpider: 8029779
- UNII: 51F690397J
- KEGG: D09755; D10452
- ChEBI: CHEBI:63584
- ChEMBL: ChEMBL1201748
- CompTox Dashboard (EPA): DTXSID40171389
- ECHA InfoCard: 100.205.741

Chemical and physical data
- Formula: C_{45}H_{57}NO_{14}
- Molar mass: 835.944 g·mol^{−1}
- 3D model (JSmol): Interactive image
- SMILES: CO[C@H]1C[C@H]2OC[C@@]2(OC(C)=O)[C@H]2[C@H](OC(=O)c3ccccc3)[C@]3(O)C[C@H](OC(=O)[C@H](O)[C@@H](NC(=O)OC(C)(C)C)c4ccccc4)C(C)=C([C@@H](OC)C(=O)[C@]12C)C3(C)C
- InChI: InChI=1S/C45H57NO14/c1-24-28(57-39(51)33(48)32(26-17-13-11-14-18-26)46-40(52)60-41(3,4)5)22-45(53)37(58-38(50)27-19-15-12-16-20-27)35-43(8,36(49)34(55-10)31(24)42(45,6)7)29(54-9)21-30-44(35,23-56-30)59-25(2)47/h11-20,28-30,32-35,37,48,53H,21-23H2,1-10H3,(H,46,52)/t28-,29-,30+,32-,33+,34+,35-,37-,43+,44-,45+/m0/s1; Key:BMQGVNUXMIRLCK-OAGWZNDDSA-N

Cabazitaxel, sold under the brand name Jevtana, is a semi-synthetic derivative of a natural taxoid. It is a microtubule inhibitor, and the fourth taxane to be approved as a cancer therapy.

Cabazitaxel was developed by Sanofi-Aventis and was approved by the US Food and Drug Administration (FDA) for the treatment of hormone-refractory prostate cancer in June 2010. It is available as a generic medication.

== Medical uses ==
Cabazitaxel is indicated in combination with prednisone for the treatment of metastatic castration-resistant prostate cancer following docetaxel-based treatment.

== Mechanism of action ==
Taxanes enhance microtubule stabilization and inhibit cellular mitosis and division. Moreover, taxanes prevent androgen receptor (AR) signaling by binding cellular microtubules and the microtubule-associated motor protein dynein, thus averting AR nuclear translocation.

== Clinical trials ==
In people with metastatic castration-resistant prostate cancer (mCRPC), overall survival (OS) is markedly enhanced with cabazitaxel versus mitoxantrone after prior docetaxel treatment. FIRSTANA (ClinicalTrials.gov identifier: NCT01308567) assessed whether cabazitaxel 20 mg/m^{2} (C20) or 25 mg/m^{2} (C25) is superior to docetaxel 75 mg/m^{2} (D75) in terms of OS in patients with chemotherapy-naïve mCRPC. However, C20 and C25 did not demonstrate superiority for OS versus D75 in people with chemotherapy-naïve mCRPC. Cabazitaxel and docetaxel demonstrated different toxicity profiles, and C20 showed the overall lowest toxicity. In a phase III trial with 755 men for the treatment of castration-resistant prostate cancer, median survival was 15.1 months for participants receiving cabazitaxel versus 12.7 months for participants receiving mitoxantrone. Cabazitaxel was associated with more grade 3–4 neutropenia (81.7%) than mitoxantrone (58%). Common adverse effects with cabazitaxel include neutropenia (including febrile neutropenia) and GIT side effects appeared mainly in diarrhea, whereas, neuropathy was rarely detected.

== Pharmacokinetics ==
Cabazitaxel administration causes a decrease in plasma concentrations showing triphasic kinetics: a mean half life (t_{1/2}) of 2.6 min in the first phase, a mean t_{1/2} of 1.3 h in the second phase, and a mean t_{1/2} of 77.3 h in the third phase.

=== Metabolism ===
Cabazitaxel is metabolized in the liver by [cytochrome P_{450} (CYP)3A4/5 > CYP2C8], which result in seven plasma metabolites and excreted 20 metabolites. During 14 days after administration, 80% of cabazitaxel is excreted: 76% in the feces and 3.7% as a renal excretion.
