= Croton oil =

Oil from the seed of Croton tiglium

Croton oil (Crotonis oleum) is an oil prepared from the seeds of Croton tiglium, a tree belonging to the order Euphorbiales and family Euphorbiaceae, and native or cultivated in India and the Malay Archipelago. Small doses taken internally cause diarrhea. Externally, the oil can cause irritation and swelling. Croton oil is used in phenol-croton oil chemical peels for its caustic exfoliating effects it has on the skin. Used in conjunction with phenol solutions, it results in an intense reaction that leads to initial skin sloughing. Since croton oil is very irritating and painful, it is used in laboratory animals to study how pain works, pain-relieving and anti-inflammatory drugs, and immunology.

Because croton tiglium oil is cocarcinogenic, it has been used in tumor research. Berenblum and Shubik saw croton oil as a "promoting" agent: a kind of carcinogen that acted through an inflammatory response. Mice painted only with croton oil did not develop tumors. Croton oil is the source of the chemical compound phorbol. Tumor promotion activity was traced to phorbol esters present in croton oil. Pure phorbol 12-myristate 13-acetate, which is found in croton oil, is widely used in laboratory research to induce tumor development.

== History of use ==
During World War II, the United States Navy added a small amount of croton oil to the neutral grain spirits that powered torpedoes. The oil was intended to prevent sailors from drinking the alcohol fuel. Sailors devised crude stills to separate the alcohol from the croton oil, as alcohol evaporates at a lower temperature than croton oil.

Norwegian partisans among workers at a factory, ordered by the Quisling government to turn over a catch of sardines to the Nazi German government for shipment to Saint-Nazaire (a U-boat base of operations) arranged with the British for a large shipment of croton oil to covertly poison the sardines, whose fishy taste was expected to conceal the tampering.

In "The Bulletin" (9 Dowry Square, Hot Wells, May 29, 1845,) the Reverend Richard Harris Barham wrote a medically inspired poem to relieve the anxiety of a very dear friend a month before his own death on June 17, 1845. The attending doctor advises his patient, among other treatments for a sore throat that is producing barely a sound: "... Please put out your tongue again! / Now the blister! / Ay, the blister! / Let your son, or else his sister, / Warm it well, then clap it here, sir, / All across from ear to ear, sir; / That suffices, / When it rises, / Snip it, sir, and then your throat on / Rub a little oil of Croton: / Never mind a little pain! / Please put out your tongue again! ..." The patient was Barham, who had accidentally swallowed a piece of pear core that got into his windpipe on October 28, 1844. Despite the "professional" advice and the very painful and "highest quality" treatments of the time being given freely to him by Doctors Roberts and Scott, and by the eminent surgeon Mr. Coulson, for "violent vomiting", "inflamed throat", and catching "a cold" in April 1845, Barham died.

== In popular culture ==
In the 1919 pamphlet The California Indians: A Clever Satire on the Government' dealings with its Indian Wards, which purports to be from an earlier 1864 documents, croton oil is said to be supplied along with other "barbarous compounds" as medicine.

In Thomas Wolfe's 1929 novel Look Homeward Angel, 18-year-old Steve Gant and a friend sneak into neighbors' barn. In the barn, Steve and his friend find a liquor bottle that the husband hid from the wife; they drink the entire bottle. For revenge, the husband refills the bottle with croton oil. When Steve and his friend return to the barn and find the bottle refilled, they drink from it. This time they get very sick.

In John Steinbeck's novel East of Eden, published in 1952, Kate uses it to murder Faye and inherit her whorehouse. Faye is poisoned with a combination of first strychnine (unsuccessfully) and then two drops of croton oil, on a salad of home-canned beans, mimicking accidental botulism poisoning. To allay suspicion, Kate also poisons herself with cáscara sagrada which gives the same cathartic symptoms, but to a non-fatal degree. Steinbeck also alludes to croton oil in In Dubious Battle, chapter 7.

In the movie They Rode West, released in 1954 and starring Robert Francis, an Army post's previous physician was widely disliked because he frequently prescribed croton oil for the troops.

In the 1966 movie El Dorado starring John Wayne, cayenne pepper, hot mustard, ipecac, asafoetida, croton oil, and gunpowder are the ingredients in an emetic administered to the drunken sheriff J. P. Harrah (Robert Mitchum) to sober him up and prevent him from drinking for the foreseeable future. Arthur Hunnicutt's character Bull expresses great surprise that the extract's use will be risked.

In Bernard Cornwell's 1994 historical fiction Copperhead, the second book of The Starbuck Chronicles, Nate Starbuck is force fed croton oil over a number of days whilst being interrogated by the Confederate authorities after he is accused of being involved in the attempted passing of sensitive military information to the Union.
