= Geranylgeranyl-diphosphate diphosphohydrolase =

Geranylgeranyl-diphosphate diphosphohydrolase may refer to:

- Sclareol cyclase, an enzyme
- (13E)-labda-7,13-dien-15-ol synthase, an enzyme
