= C20H34 =

The molecular formula C_{20}H_{34} (molar mass: 274.49 g/mol, exact mass: 274.2661 u) may refer to:

- 19-Norpregnane, or 13β-methyl-17β-ethylgonane
- Phyllocladane
- Tigliane
