= Exudative hyponychial dermatitis =

- Specialty: Dermatology

Exudative hyponychial dermatitis is a nail toxicity common during chemotherapy for breast cancer, especially if docetaxel is the chemotherapeutic regimen.

== See also ==
- Skin lesion
- List of cutaneous conditions
