= Taxagifine =

Names
- IUPAC name 11-Hydroxy-13-oxo-12,17-epoxy-12α-tax-4(20)-ene-2α,5α,7β,9α,10β-pentayl 2,7,9,10-tetraacetate 5-[(2E)-3-phenylprop-2-enoate]
- Systematic IUPAC name (1S,3aR,4R,5R,5aR,7S,9S,9aS,10R,11S,11aR)-11a-Hydroxy-1,3a,9a-trimethyl-6-methylidene-13-oxotetradecahydro-1,4-ethanobenzo[5,6]cycloocta[1,2-c]furan-5,7,9,10,11-pentayl 5,9,10,11-tetraacetate 7-[(2E)-3-phenylprop-2-enoate]

Identifiers
CAS Number	81489-69-2
3D model (JSmol)	Interactive image
ChEMBL	ChEMBL405007
ChemSpider	23168591
PubChem CID	44316472
UNII	H6F6Z86DFD
CompTox Dashboard (EPA)	DTXSID801336359
- InChI: InChI=1S/C37H44O13/c1-19-26(50-29(43)15-14-24-12-10-9-11-13-24)17-28(46-20(2)38)35(7)30(19)31(47-21(3)39)25-16-27(42)36(8)37(44,34(25,6)18-45-36)33(49-23(5)41)32(35)48-22(4)40/h9-15,25-26,28,30-33,44H,1,16-18H2,2-8H3/b15-14+/t25-,26-,28-,30-,31+,32-,33-,34-,35+,36+,37-/m0/s1 Key: FQCUWQFKTUBVLA-PGBLWRDZSA-N
- SMILES: CC(=O)O[C@H]1C[C@@H](C(=C)[C@@H]2[C@@]1([C@H]([C@@H]([C@@]3([C@]4(CO[C@@]3(C(=O)C[C@H]4[C@H]2OC(=O)C)C)C)O)OC(=O)C)OC(=O)C)C)OC(=O)/C=C/C5=CC=CC=C5

Properties
Chemical formula	C_{37}H_{44}O_{13}
Molar mass	696.746 g·mol^{−1}
- Except where otherwise noted, data are given for materials in their standard state (at 25 °C [77 °F], 100 kPa). Infobox references

Taxagifine is a taxane isolated from Taxus.
