= Abeotaxane =

Chemical structure of taxchinin A, an abeotaxane

Abeotaxanes are a class of taxoid molecules with a core 5/7/6 type ring structure. This structure varies from the 6/8/6 or 6/10/6-membered core ring found in conventional taxoids such as paclitaxel or docetaxel. The core carbon skeleton of a normal natural product taxane (e.g., paclitaxel, docetaxel) has a 6-membered A ring, 8-membered B ring and a 6-membered C ring, combined with conventional side chains. It is the side chains that provide most of the activity for regular taxanes. Abeotaxanes are compounds containing 3 altered ring structures, where ring A is 5 members, ring B is 7 members and ring C is 6 members, combined with conventional side chains.

Like taxanes, abeotaxanes are diterpenes produced by the yew tree (genus Taxus). These agents inhibit the growth and replication of cancer cells by affecting microtubules. Taxanes are highly effective anti-cancer agents and are utilized as first and second-line therapy in the treatment of many solid-tumor cancers. Since the FDA approval of paclitaxel in 1998, subsequent research has focused on the synthesis of new and improved taxanes to address the issues of multi-drug resistance and central nervous system bioavailability, as well as on improvement of the side effect profile.

Taxchinin A was the first naturally occurring rearranged taxoid identified as an 11(15→1)-abeotaxane. Taxchinin B was the first identified 11(15→1)-abeotaxoid with an oxetane ring. The first natural taxoid, identified to have an 11(15→1)-abeotaxane ring was brevifoliol. TPI 287 (formerly ARC-100), a 11(15→1)-abeotaxane that was in phase I clinical development in 2010, has demonstrated potent activity in multi-drug resistant tumor types, including taxane-resistant tumors, as well as efficacy in crossing the blood–brain barrier.
