= Taxadiene 5alpha-hydroxylase =

taxadiene 5-alpha-hydroxylase

Identifiers
- EC no.: 1.14.99.37
- CAS no.: 9035-51-2

Databases
- IntEnz: IntEnz view
- BRENDA: BRENDA entry
- ExPASy: NiceZyme view
- KEGG: KEGG entry
- MetaCyc: metabolic pathway
- PRIAM: profile
- PDB structures: RCSB PDB PDBe PDBsum
- Gene Ontology: AmiGO / QuickGO
Search
- PMC: articles
- PubMed: articles
- NCBI: proteins

In enzymology, a taxadiene 5alpha-hydroxylase (EC 1.14.99.37) is an enzyme that catalyzes the chemical reaction

taxa-4,11-diene + AH_{2} + O_{2} $\rightleftharpoons$ taxa-4(20),11-dien-5alpha-ol + A + H_{2}O

The 3 substrates of this enzyme are taxa-4,11-diene, an electron acceptor AH_{2}, and O_{2}, whereas its 3 products are taxa-4(20),11-dien-5alpha-ol, the reduction product A, and H_{2}O.

This enzyme belongs to the family of oxidoreductases, specifically those acting on paired donors, with O2 as oxidant and incorporation or reduction of oxygen. The oxygen incorporated need not be derive from O miscellaneous. The systematic name of this enzyme class is taxa-4,11-diene,hydrogen-donor:oxygen oxidoreductase (5alpha-hydroxylating). This enzyme participates in diterpenoid biosynthesis.
