= Yunnanxane =

Names
- Systematic IUPAC name 2,5,10-Triacetoxytaxa-4(20),11-dien-14-yl 3-hydroxy-2-methylbutanoate

Identifiers
CAS Number	139713-81-8
3D model (JSmol)	Interactive image
ChEMBL	ChEMBL245750
ChemSpider	4474732
PubChem CID	11226788
UNII	T725E7U7QJ
CompTox Dashboard (EPA)	DTXSID30930563
- InChI: InChI=1S/C31H46O9/c1-15-13-23(40-29(36)16(2)18(4)32)27-28(39-21(7)35)26-17(3)22(37-19(5)33)11-12-31(26,10)14-24(38-20(6)34)25(15)30(27,8)9/h16,18,22-24,26-28,32H,3,11-14H2,1-2,4-10H3/t16?,18?,22-,23-,24-,26-,27-,28-,31-/m0/s1 Key: FMPIEMVVEJGMCY-IRWPHOLZSA-N
- SMILES: CC1(C)C([C@@H](OC(C)=O)C[C@@]2(C)[C@](C([C@@H](OC(C)=O)CC2)=C)([H])[C@@H]3OC(C)=O)=C(C)[C@@H](OC([C@H](C)[C@H](C)O)=O)C[C@]13[H]

Properties
Chemical formula	C_{31}H_{46}O_{9}
Molar mass	562.700 g·mol^{−1}
- Except where otherwise noted, data are given for materials in their standard state (at 25 °C [77 °F], 100 kPa). Infobox references

Yunnanxane is a bioactive taxane diterpenoid first isolated from Taxus wallichiana. Yunnanxane was later isolated from cell cultures of Taxus cuspidata and Taxus chinensis. Four homologous esters of yunnanxane have also been isolated from Taxus. Yunnanxane is reported to have anticancer activity in vitro.

== See also ==
- Taxusin
- Hongdoushans
