= Momilactone-A synthase =

Identifiers
- EC no.: 1.1.1.295

Databases
- IntEnz: IntEnz view
- BRENDA: BRENDA entry
- ExPASy: NiceZyme view
- KEGG: KEGG entry
- MetaCyc: metabolic pathway
- PRIAM: profile
- PDB structures: RCSB PDB PDBe PDBsum
Search
- PMC: articles
- PubMed: articles
- NCBI: proteins

Momilactone-A synthase (EC 1.1.1.295, momilactone A synthase, OsMAS) is an enzyme with systematic name 3beta-hydroxy-9beta-pimara-7,15-diene-19,6beta-olide:NAD(P)^{+} oxidoreductase. This enzyme catalyses the following chemical reaction:

3β-hydroxy-9β-pimara-7,15-dien-19,6β-olide
+ NAD^{+}
H^{+}
H^{+}
momilactone A
+ NADH

The rice phytoalexin momilactone A is a diterpenoid secondary metabolite that is involved in the defense mechanism of the plant. Momilactone A is produced in response to attack by a pathogen through the perception of elicitor signal molecules such as chitin oligosaccharide, or after exposure to UV irradiation.
