= Taxusin =

Names
- IUPAC name Taxa-4(20),11-diene-5α,9α,10β,13α-tetrayl tetraacetate
- Systematic IUPAC name (3S,4aR,6R,8S,11R,12R,12aR)-9,12a,13,13-Tetramethyl-4-methylidene-1,2,3,4,4a,5,6,7,8,11,12,12a-dodecahydro-6,10-methanobenzo[10]annulene-3,8,11,12-tetrayl tetraacetate

Identifiers
CAS Number	19605-80-2
3D model (JSmol)	Interactive image
ChEBI	CHEBI:63664
ChEMBL	ChEMBL368741
ChemSpider	146810
PubChem CID	167825
UNII	VHS5792RP7
CompTox Dashboard (EPA)	DTXSID90941377
- InChI: InChI=1S/C28H40O8/c1-14-21-12-20-13-23(34-17(4)30)15(2)24(27(20,7)8)25(35-18(5)31)26(36-19(6)32)28(21,9)11-10-22(14)33-16(3)29/h20-23,25-26H,1,10-13H2,2-9H3/t20-,21-,22+,23+,25-,26+,28-/m1/s1 Key: SKJSIVQEPKBFTJ-HUWILPJBSA-N
- SMILES: [H][C@@]1(C[C@@]2([H])C[C@]3([H])C(=C)[C@H](CC[C@@]3(C)[C@@H](OC(C)=O)[C@H](OC(C)=O)C(=C1C)C2(C)C)OC(C)=O)OC(C)=O

Properties
Chemical formula	C_{28}H_{40}O_{8}
Molar mass	504.612396 Da
- Except where otherwise noted, data are given for materials in their standard state (at 25 °C [77 °F], 100 kPa). Infobox references

Taxusin is a taxane isolate derived from Taxus wallichiana. Taxusin can be used to synthesize taxadiene -diol and -triol derivatives via deoxygenation.

== Taxol biosynthesis ==
Taxusin is found in the yew tree Taxus cuspidata where it forms part of the pathway to taxol. The enzyme taxoid 7beta-hydroxylase, which uses oxygen and a reduced nicotinamide adenine dinucleotide (NADH) cofactor bound to a heme in cytochrome P450, converts it to a hydroxylated derivative:

taxusin
+ NADPH
O_{2} + H^{+}
H_{2}O
7β-hydroxytaxusin
+ NADP^{+}

== See also ==
- Yunnanxane
- Hongdoushans
