= Decinnamoyltaxinine J =

Chemical compound

Names
- IUPAC name 5α-Hydroxytaxa-4(20),11-diene-2α,7β,9α,10β,13α-pentayl pentaacetate
- Systematic IUPAC name (1S,3S,4aR,5R,6R,8S,11R,12R,12aS)-3-Hydroxy-9,12a,13,13-tetramethyl-4-methylidene-1,2,3,4,4a,5,6,7,8,11,12,12a-dodecahydro-6,10-methanobenzo[10]annulene-1,5,8,11,12-pentayl pentaacetate

Identifiers
CAS Number	84652-33-5
3D model (JSmol)	Interactive image
ChEMBL	ChEMBL312298
ChemSpider	23168598
PubChem CID	14446187
CompTox Dashboard (EPA)	DTXSID401336357
- InChI: InChI=1S/C30H42O11/c1-13-21(36)12-23(38-16(4)32)30(10)25(13)26(39-17(5)33)20-11-22(37-15(3)31)14(2)24(29(20,8)9)27(40-18(6)34)28(30)41-19(7)35/h20-23,25-28,36H,1,11-12H2,2-10H3/t20-,21-,22-,23-,25-,26+,27+,28-,30+/m0/s1 Key: NTRHFSRAAXRZLC-FJANQRQLSA-N; InChI=1/C30H42O11/c1-13-21(36)12-23(38-16(4)32)30(10)25(13)26(39-17(5)33)20-11-22(37-15(3)31)14(2)24(29(20,8)9)27(40-18(6)34)28(30)41-19(7)35/h20-23,25-28,36H,1,11-12H2,2-10H3/t20-,21-,22-,23-,25-,26+,27+,28-,30+/m0/s1 Key: NTRHFSRAAXRZLC-FJANQRQLBN
- SMILES: CC1=C2[C@H]([C@@H]([C@@]3([C@H](C[C@@H](C(=C)[C@H]3[C@@H]([C@@H](C2(C)C)C[C@@H]1OC(=O)C)OC(=O)C)O)OC(=O)C)C)OC(=O)C)OC(=O)C

Properties
Chemical formula	C_{30}H_{42}O_{11}
Molar mass	578.655 g·mol^{−1}
- Except where otherwise noted, data are given for materials in their standard state (at 25 °C [77 °F], 100 kPa). Infobox references

Decinnamoyltaxinine J is a taxane isolate derived from Taxus brevifolia.
