= Phorbol =

- Phorbol

Names
- Preferred IUPAC name (1aR,1bS,4aR,7aS,9bS,8R,9R,9aS)-4a,7b,9,9a-Tetrahydroxy-3-(hydroxymethyl)-1,1,6,8-tetramethyl-1,1a,1b,4,4a,7a,7b,8,9,9a-decahydro-5H-cyclopropa[3,4]benzo[1,2-e]azulen-5-one

Identifiers
CAS Number	17673-25-5
3D model (JSmol)	Interactive image
ChEBI	CHEBI:8116
ChemSpider	390610
ECHA InfoCard	100.162.035
PubChem CID	442070
UNII	XUZ76S9127
CompTox Dashboard (EPA)	DTXSID2021155
- InChI: InChI=1S/C20H28O6/c1-9-5-13-18(24,15(9)22)7-11(8-21)6-12-14-17(3,4)20(14,26)16(23)10(2)19(12,13)25/h5-6,10,12-14,16,21,23-26H,7-8H2,1-4H3/t10-,12+,13-,14-,16-,18-,19-,20-/m1/s1 Key: QGVLYPPODPLXMB-UBTYZVCOSA-N; InChI=1/C20H28O6/c1-9-5-13-18(24,15(9)22)7-11(8-21)6-12-14-17(3,4)20(14,26)16(23)10(2)19(12,13)25/h5-6,10,12-14,16,21,23-26H,7-8H2,1-4H3/t10-,12+,13-,14-,16-,18-,19-,20-/m1/s1 Key: QGVLYPPODPLXMB-UBTYZVCOBR
- SMILES: OCC1=C[C@]([C@@](C(C)4C)([H])[C@]4(O)[C@H](O)[C@H]2C)([H])[C@]2(O)[C@@](C=C(C)C3=O)([H])[C@@]3(O)C1

Properties
Chemical formula	C_{20}H_{28}O_{6}
Molar mass	364.438 g·mol^{−1}
Melting point	250 to 251 °C (482 to 484 °F; 523 to 524 K)
Solubility in water	Soluble in DMSO (25mg/ml), 100% ethanol (25mg/ml), acetone, ether or dimethyl formamide; almost insoluble in aqueous buffers.
- Except where otherwise noted, data are given for materials in their standard state (at 25 °C [77 °F], 100 kPa). verify (what is ?) Infobox references

Phorbol is a natural, plant-derived organic compound. It is a member of the tigliane family of diterpenes. Phorbol was first isolated in 1934 via the hydrolysis of croton oil, which is derived from the seeds of the purging croton, Croton tiglium. The structure of phorbol was determined in 1967. Various esters of phorbol have important biological properties, the most notable of which is the capacity to act as tumor promoters through activation of protein kinase C. They mimic diacylglycerols, glycerol derivatives in which two hydroxyl groups have reacted with fatty acids to form esters. The most common and potent phorbol ester is 12-O-tetradecanoylphorbol-13-acetate (TPA), also called phorbol-12-myristate-13-acetate (PMA), which is used as a biomedical research tool in contexts such as models of carcinogenesis.

== History and source ==
Phorbol is a natural product found in many plants, especially those of the Euphorbiaceae and Thymelaeaceae families. Phorbol and phorbol esters are the active constituents of the highly toxic New World tropical manchineel tree (Hippomane mancinella). It is very soluble in most polar organic solvents, as well as in water. In the manchineel, this leads to an additional exposure risk during rain, where liquid splashing from an undamaged tree may also be injurious. Contact with the tree or consumption of its fruit can lead to symptoms such as severe pain and swelling.

The purging croton, Croton tiglium, is the source of croton oil from which phorbol was initially isolated. Its seeds and oil have been used for hundreds of years in traditional medicine, generally as a purgative, and the seeds were mentioned in Chinese herbal texts 2000 years ago. The purgative effects of the oil are largely attributed to the high percentage of phorbol esters contained in the oil. Phorbol was isolated from C. tiglium seeds in 1934. The structure of the compound was determined in 1967, and a total synthesis was described in 2015.

== Mechanism of action ==
Phorbol derivatives work primarily by interacting with protein kinase C (PKC), although they can interact with other phospholipid membrane receptors. The esters bind to PKC in a similar way to its natural ligand, diacylglycerol, and activate the kinase. Diacylglycerol is degraded quickly by the body, allowing PKC to be reversibly activated. When phorbol esters bind to the receptor, they are not degraded as efficiently by the body, leading to constitutively active PK. PKC is involved in a number of important cell signaling pathways. Thus, phorbol ester exposure can show a wide range of results.

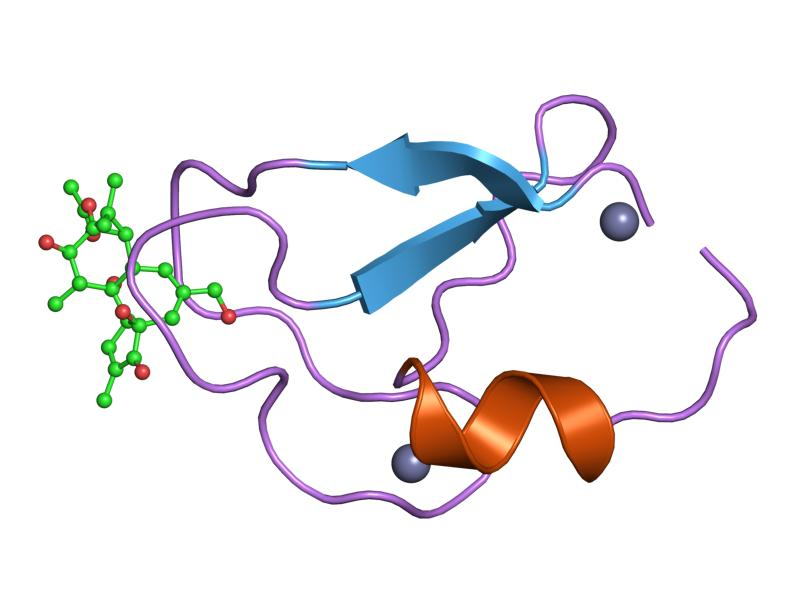
Crystal structure of phorbol-13-acetate bound to the C1B domain of protein kinase C delta

The main results of phorbol exposure are tumor promotion and inflammatory response. Although phorbol is not a carcinogen itself, it greatly enhances the action of other substances and promotes tumor proliferation. PKC is a key component in biological pathways controlling cell growth and differentiation. When phorbol esters bind to PKC, cell proliferation pathways are activated. This effect greatly promotes tumors when the cells are exposed to even a sub-carcinogenic amount of a substance. PKC is also involved in activation of inflammation pathways such as the NF-κB pathway. Thus, exposure to phorbol products can induce an inflammatory response in tissues. Symptoms can include edema and pain, especially to the skin and mucous membranes. While phorbol itself does not have irritant activity, nearly all phorbol esters are highly irritant, with a wide range of half-maximal inhibitory concentration (IC_{50}) values. The median lethal dose (LD_{50}) of phorbol esters for male mice was found to be about 27 mg/kg, with the mice showing hemorrhage and congestion of pulmonary blood vessels, as well as lesions throughout the body.

== Total synthesis ==
A total synthesis of enantiopure phorbol was developed in 2015. While this synthesis will not replace natural isolation products, it will enable researchers to create phorbol analogs for use in research, especially creating phorbol derivatives that can be evaluated for anti-cancer activity. Previously, the difficulty with synthesizing phorbol had been creating C–C bonds, especially in the six-membered ring at the top of the molecule. This synthesis starts from (+)-3-carene, and uses a series of 19 steps to eventually create (+)-phorbol.

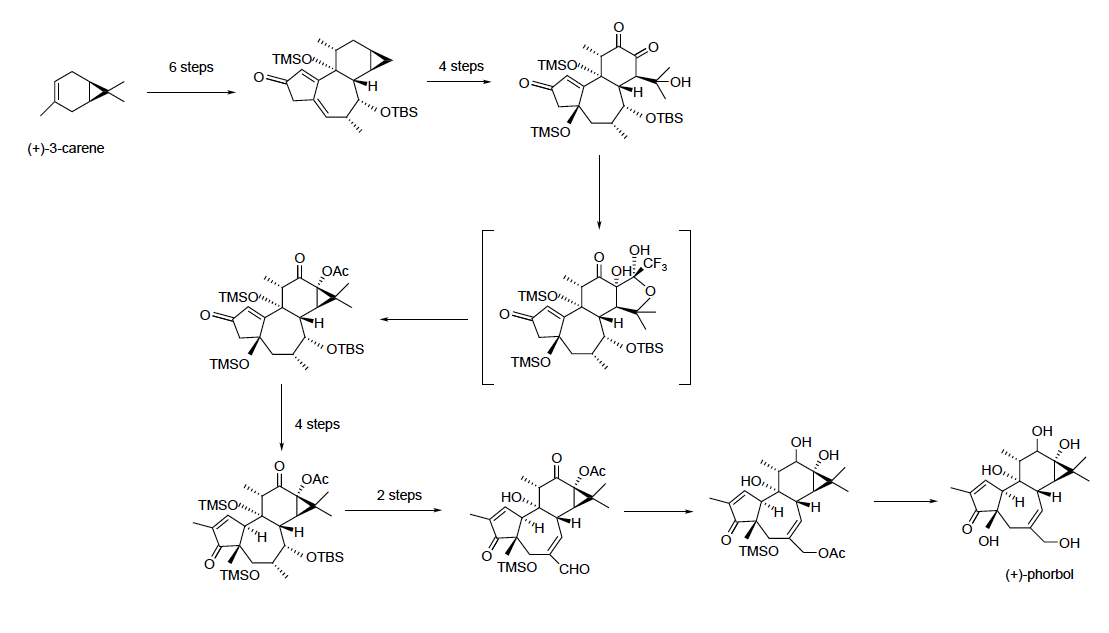
Overview of the complete synthesis of (+)-phorbol starting with (+)-3-carene

== Uses in biomedical research ==
Because of their mechanism of action, phorbol esters can be used to study tumor proliferation and pain response. TPA is most commonly used in the laboratory to induce a cellular response. For example, TPA can be used to measure response to pain and test compounds that may mitigate the inflammatory response. TPA and other phorbol esters can also be used to induce tumor formation and to study mechanism of action. TPA, together with ionomycin, can also be used to stimulate T-cell activation, proliferation, and cytokine production, and is used in protocols for intracellular staining of these cytokines.

=== Possible and purported medicinal uses ===
The phorbol ester tigilanol tiglate reportedly has in vitro anti-cancer, antiviral, and antibacterial activities. The phorbol derivatives in croton oil are used in folk medicine, with purported purgative, counter-irritant, or anthelmintic activities.
