= Taxamairin A =

Names
- Preferred IUPAC name 6-Hydroxy-7-methoxy-1,1-dimethyl-8-(propan-2-yl)-1H-dibenzo[a,d][7]annulene-2,10-dione

Identifiers
CAS Number	110300-76-0
3D model (JSmol)	Interactive image
ChemSpider	115549
PubChem CID	130631
UNII	UD9474U6RM
CompTox Dashboard (EPA)	DTXSID40149205
- InChI: InChI=1S/C21H22O4/c1-11(2)13-9-14-15(19(24)20(13)25-5)8-12-6-7-18(23)21(3,4)16(12)10-17(14)22/h6-11,24H,1-5H3 Key: LKWPNJGNAHHUDE-UHFFFAOYSA-N
- SMILES: CC(C)C1=C(C(=C2C=C3C=CC(=O)C(C3=CC(=O)C2=C1)(C)C)O)OC

Properties
Chemical formula	C_{21}H_{22}O_{4}
Molar mass	338.39698
- Except where otherwise noted, data are given for materials in their standard state (at 25 °C [77 °F], 100 kPa). Infobox references

Taxamairin A is a non-taxane isolate of Taxus yunnanensis.
