= Scleroderma-like reaction to taxanes =

Scleroderma-like reaction to taxanes may occur in patients treated with docetaxel or paclitaxel, characterized by an acute, diffuse, infiltrated edema of the extremities and head.

== See also ==
- Skin lesion
