= Stemodene =

Names
- IUPAC name (14S)-9,15:14,20-Dicyclo-8α-labd-13(16)-ene
- Systematic IUPAC name (4aS,6aS,8S,11aR,11bS)-4,4,11b-Trimethyl-9-methylidenetetradecahydro-8,11a-methanocyclohepta[a]naphthalene

Identifiers
CAS Number	929635-55-2 UNII_Ref =
3D model (JSmol)	Interactive image
Beilstein Reference	10812290
ChEBI	CHEBI:50068
ChemSpider	24785627
KEGG	C18224
PubChem CID	24798689
UNII	B473VDT3WP
CompTox Dashboard (EPA)	DTXSID801027728
- InChI: InChI=1S/C20H32/c1-14-8-11-20-13-15(14)12-16(20)6-7-17-18(2,3)9-5-10-19(17,20)4/h15-17H,1,5-13H2,2-4H3/t15-,16-,17-,19-,20+/m0/s1 Key: GNNRCBBKCVNPSC-VDWQKOAOSA-N
- SMILES: [H][C@@]12CC[C@@]3([H])C(C)(C)CCC[C@]3(C)[C@]1(CCC4=C)C[C@@H]4C2

Properties
Chemical formula	C_{20}H_{32}
Molar mass	272.476 g·mol^{−1}
- Except where otherwise noted, data are given for materials in their standard state (at 25 °C [77 °F], 100 kPa). Infobox references

Stemodene is a labdane-related diterpene whose corresponding class I terpene synthase has been discovered in rice and subsequently cloned and functionally characterized. The gene responsible for stemodene production has not been found in the completed rice genome, thus suggesting that perhaps other genes are as yet undiscovered in the "completed" genome. Stemarene synthase demonstrates high sequence homology with stemodene synthase, thus accounting for the latter's discovery by Dana Morrone in 2005. Additionally, the corresponding olefin produced by each cyclase shows structural similarities and is derived from the common precursor of syn-copalyl diphosphate.
