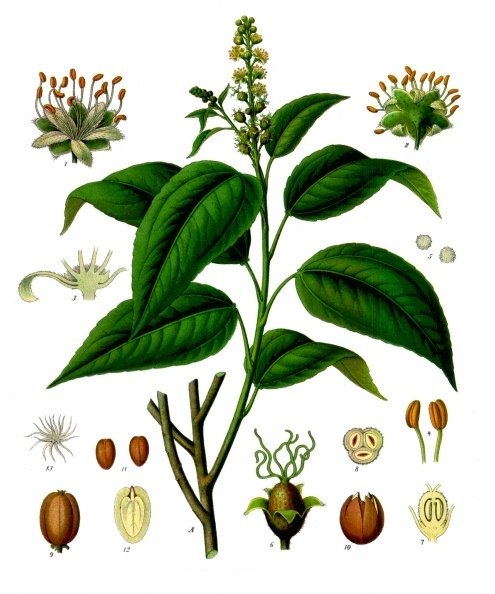

Scientific classification
- Kingdom: Plantae
- Clade: Embryophytes
- Clade: Tracheophytes
- Clade: Spermatophytes
- Clade: Angiosperms
- Clade: Eudicots
- Clade: Rosids
- Order: Malpighiales
- Family: Euphorbiaceae
- Genus: Croton
- Species: C. tiglium

Binomial name
- Croton tiglium L. (1753)

Synonyms
- Croton acutus Thunb.; Croton arboreus Shecut; Croton birmanicus Müll.Arg.; Croton camaza Perr.; Croton himalaicus D.G.Long; Croton jamalgota Buch.-Ham.; Croton muricatus Blanco [Illegitimate]; Croton officinalis (Klotzsch) Alston [Illegitimate]; Croton pavana Buch.-Ham.; Croton tiglium var. tiglium; Halecus verus Raf.; Kurkas tiglium (L.) Raf.; Oxydectes birmanica (Müll.Arg.) Kuntze; Oxydectes blancoana Kuntze; Oxydectes pavana (Buch.-Ham.) Kuntze; Oxydectes tiglium (L.) Kuntze; Tiglium officinale Klotzsch

= Croton tiglium =

Purging croton

Species of plant

Croton tiglium, known as purging croton, is a plant species in the family Euphorbiaceae.

== Etymology ==
The specific name tiglium is of obscure origin. It may come from the traditional name given by pharmacists to the seeds of the croton plant. According to one suggestion, it may be derived from the Greek tiglos, diarrhea. According to another, it may refer to one of the Maluku Islands in Indonesia, ostensibly the home habitat of the species.

== Traditional uses ==
Croton tiglium is one of the 50 fundamental herbs used in traditional Chinese medicine, where it has the name bā dòu (Chinese: 巴豆). C. tiglium is known as japaala/ජාපාල or jayapala in Sinhala and used in Sinhala traditional medical system of Sri Lanka and in Sanskrit. The seeds are called jamālgoṭa in Hindi, Marathi, and Urdu, and are well known for their toxicity (severe purgative effect). They are used to treat constipation after the seeds have undergone a traditional Ayurvedic detoxification process with cow's milk (godugdha). This is referred to as Śodhana, a general term for detoxification. The plant is poisonous, with the bark used as an arrow poison and the seeds used to poison fish.

== Chemical constituents ==
Major known chemical constituents are crotonoleic acid, glyceryl crotonate, crotonic acid, crotonic resin, and various co-carcinogenic phorbol derivatives.

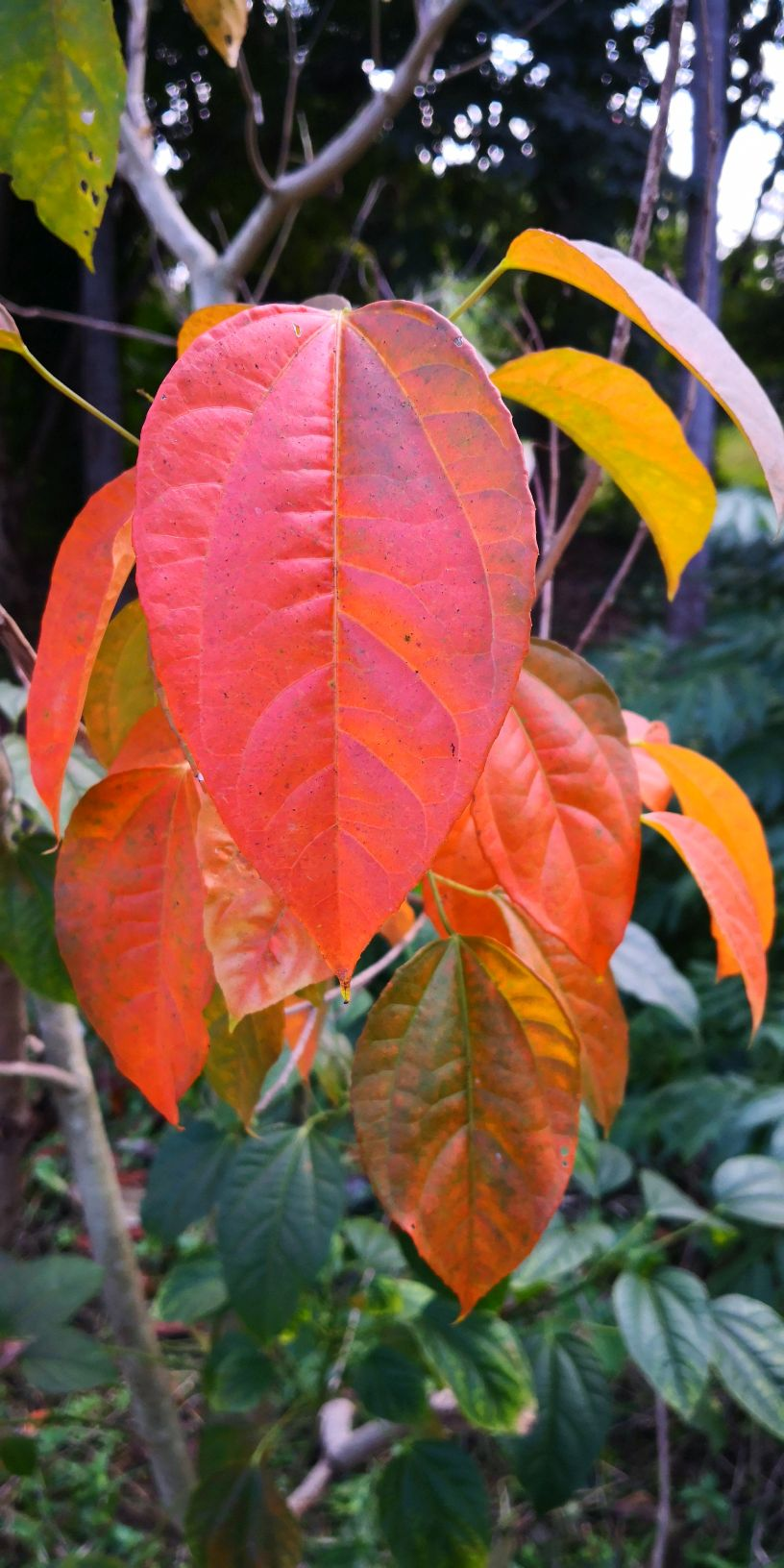
C. tiglium – autumn leaves, January 2020, Nan Yao Yuan, Jinghong, Xishuangbanna, Yunnan, SW China

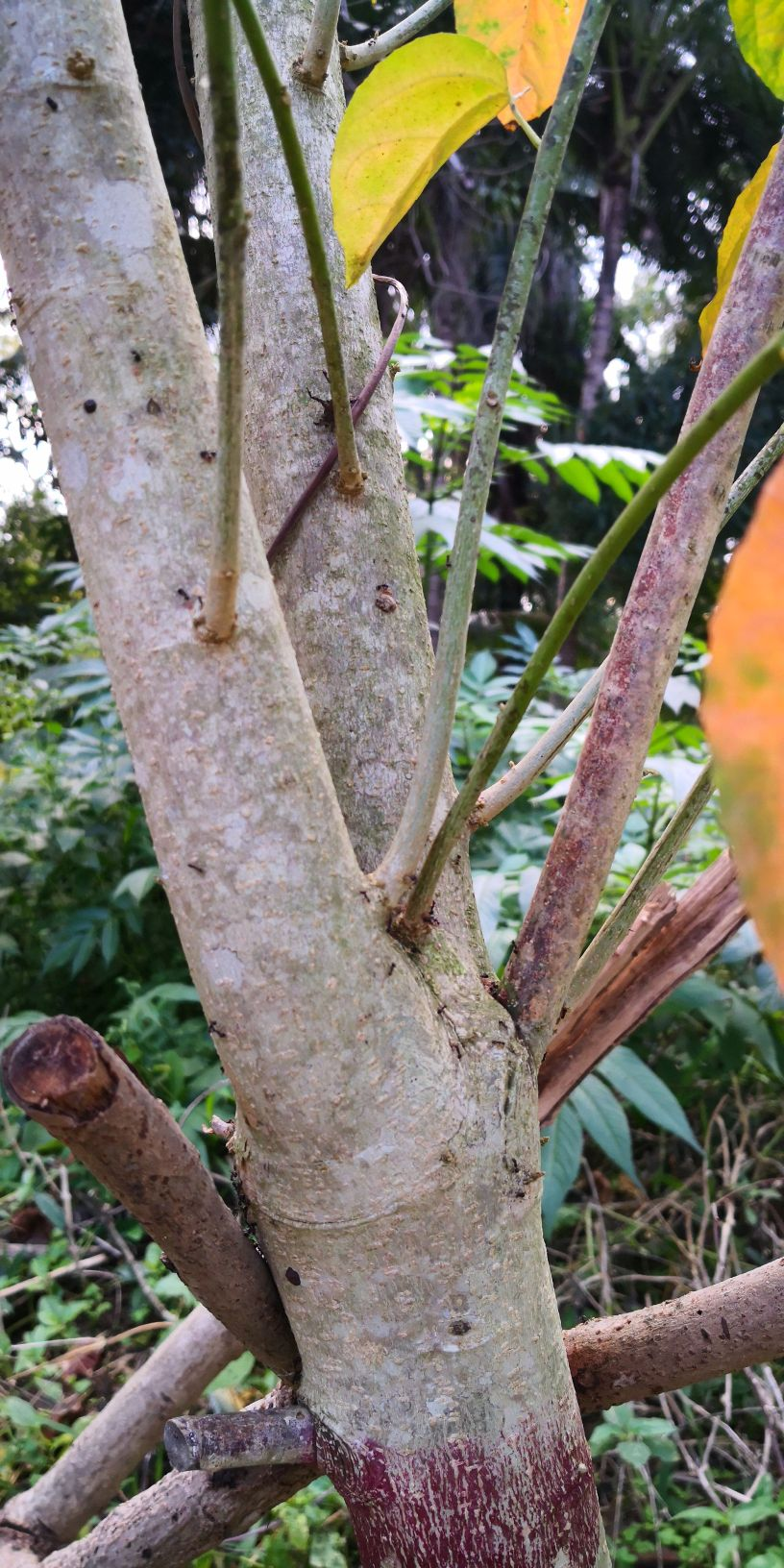
C. tiglium – stem with bark, January 2020, Nan Yao Yuan, Jinghong, Xishuangbanna, Yunnan, SW China
