= Taxoid 7beta-hydroxylase =

Class of enzymes

Identifiers
- EC no.: 1.14.14.182

Databases
- IntEnz: IntEnz view
- BRENDA: BRENDA entry
- ExPASy: NiceZyme view
- KEGG: KEGG entry
- MetaCyc: metabolic pathway
- PRIAM: profile
- PDB structures: RCSB PDB PDBe PDBsum
Search
- PMC: articles
- PubMed: articles
- NCBI: proteins

Taxoid 7beta-hydroxylase (EC 1.14.14.182) is an enzyme with systematic name taxusin,NADPH:oxygen 7-oxidoreductase. This enzyme catalyses the following chemical reaction

taxusin
+ NADPH
O_{2} + H^{+}
H_{2}O
7β-hydroxytaxusin
+ NADP^{+}

The three substrates of this enzyme are taxusin, oxygen, and a proton. It uses a reduced nicotinamide adenine dinucleotide (NADH) cofactor bound to a heme in cytochrome P450 to give 7β-hydroxytaxusin and water as products.

The enzyme is found in the yew tree Taxus cuspidata and is part of the pathway for the biosynthesis of taxol.
