= Miltiradiene synthase =

Identifiers
- EC no.: 4.2.3.131

Databases
- IntEnz: IntEnz view
- BRENDA: BRENDA entry
- ExPASy: NiceZyme view
- KEGG: KEGG entry
- MetaCyc: metabolic pathway
- PRIAM: profile
- PDB structures: RCSB PDB PDBe PDBsum
Search
- PMC: articles
- PubMed: articles
- NCBI: proteins

Miltiradiene synthase (EC 4.2.3.131, SmMDS, SmiKSL) is an enzyme with systematic name (+)-copaly-diphosphate diphosphate-lyase (cyclizing, miltiradiene-forming). This enzyme catalyses the following chemical reaction

(+)-copalyl diphosphate $\rightleftharpoons$ miltiradiene + diphosphate

This enzyme is isolated from the plant Selaginella moellendorffii.
