= Spindle poison =

Poison that disrupts cell division

A spindle poison, also known as a spindle toxin, is a poison that disrupts cell division by affecting the protein threads that connect the centromere regions of chromosomes, known as spindles. Spindle poisons effectively cease the production of new cells by interrupting the mitosis phase of cell division at the spindle assembly checkpoint (SAC). However, as numerous and varied as they are, spindle poisons are not yet 100% effective at ending the formation of tumors (neoplasms). Although not 100% effective, substantive therapeutic efficacy has been found in these types of chemotherapeutic treatments. The mitotic spindle is composed of microtubules (polymerized tubulin) that aid, along with regulatory proteins, each other in the activity of appropriately segregating replicated chromosomes. Certain compounds affecting the mitotic spindle have proven highly effective against solid tumors and hematological malignancies.

Two specific families of antimitotic agents — vinca alkaloids and taxanes — interrupt the cell’s division by the agitation of microtubule dynamics. The vinca alkaloids work by causing the inhibition of the polymerization of tubulin into microtubules, resulting in the G2/M arrest within the cell cycle and eventually cell death. In contrast, the taxanes arrest the mitotic cell cycle by stabilizing microtubules against depolymerization. Even though numerous other spindle proteins exist that could be the target of novel chemotherapeutics, tubulin-binding agents are the only types in clinical use. Agents that affect the motor protein kinesin are beginning to enter clinical trials. Another type, paclitaxel, acts by attaching to tubulin within existing microtubules. Next, it stabilizes the polymer.

== Spindle assembly checkpoint (SAC) ==
Normally, cells duplicate their genetic material and then produce two equal daughter cells. Tampering with this tightly monitored distribution system can result in the production of irregular chromosome content, within each cell, commonly referred to as aneuploidy. Cells have developed various checkpoints to carry out mitosis with great accuracy. Early research concluded that spindle poisons, inserted to cells, caused a considerable reduction in the number of cells that exited mitosis, while the number of cells that entered mitosis dramatically increased. The SAC was found to be the key signaling pathway to the mitotic arrest. The precise division of chromosomes is the primary responsibility of SAC. Its origin stems from kinetochores, proteins that aid in joining DNA and microtubules on the chromatids. Only one unattached kinetochore is required to fuel a response that ultimately blocks cell cycle progression. The end result is each chromosome is attached to the spindle in the initial stage of anaphase.

== Mitosis ==
During normal mitosis, the SAC is active for a short duration of minutes. During this period, spindle microtubules attach to chromosomes and rectify any improper attachments. High cyclin B levels are also maintained through inhibition of an E3 ubiquitin ligase that normally seeks out cyclin B for degradation. This particular ligase is referred to as (APC/C) anaphase promoting complex or cyclosome. When the APC/C is inhibited, cyclin B levels are kept high by the SAC and it ultimately protects cyclin-dependent kinase (CDK1). Mitosis is prompted by the activation of (CDK1) by cyclin B. After confirmation of proper attachment of all chromosomes, the SAC is turned off and degradation of cyclin B occurs by way of the (APC/C). Spindle poisons, in contrast, inhibit kinetochores during mitosis and prevent them from forming proper attachments to spindle microtubules. Permanent activation of the SAC ensues along with a mitotic arrest that lasts several hours. These cells will either exit mitosis by a different pathway not normal to mitosis or they will apoptose.

== Examples ==
Some spindle poisons:

- Mebendazole
- Colchicine
- Griseofulvin
- Vinca Alkaloids
- Paclitaxel (Taxol)

== See also ==
- Taxane
- Mitotic inhibitor
