= Taxuyunnanine =

Chemical structure of taxuyunnanine A

Taxuyunnanines is a class of taxoids isolated from plants of the genus Taxus.
