= (13E)-labda-7,13-dien-15-ol synthase =

Class of enzymes

Identifiers
- EC no.: 3.1.7.10

Databases
- BRENDA: enzyme data
- ExPASy: NiceZyme view
- KEGG: enzyme entry
- MetaCyc: metabolic pathway
- Rhea: reactions
- PDB structures: RCSB PDB PDBe PDBsum
Search
- PMC: articles
- PubMed: articles
- NCBI: proteins

(13E)-labda-7,13-dien-15-ol synthase (EC 3.1.7.10, labda-7,13E-dien-15-ol synthase) is an enzyme with systematic name geranylgeranyl-diphosphate diphosphohydrolase [(13E)-labda-7,13-dien-15-ol-forming]. It catalyses the reaction

geranylgeranyl pyrophosphate
H_{2}O
PP_{i}
(13E)-labda-7,13-dien-15-ol

The enzyme characterised from the lycophyte Selaginella moellendorffii converts geranylgeranyl pyrophosphate to the labdane derivative, (13E)-labda-7,13-dien-15-ol, and pyrophosphate (PP_{i}). The reaction proceeds in two steps: cyclisation and then hydrolysis.
