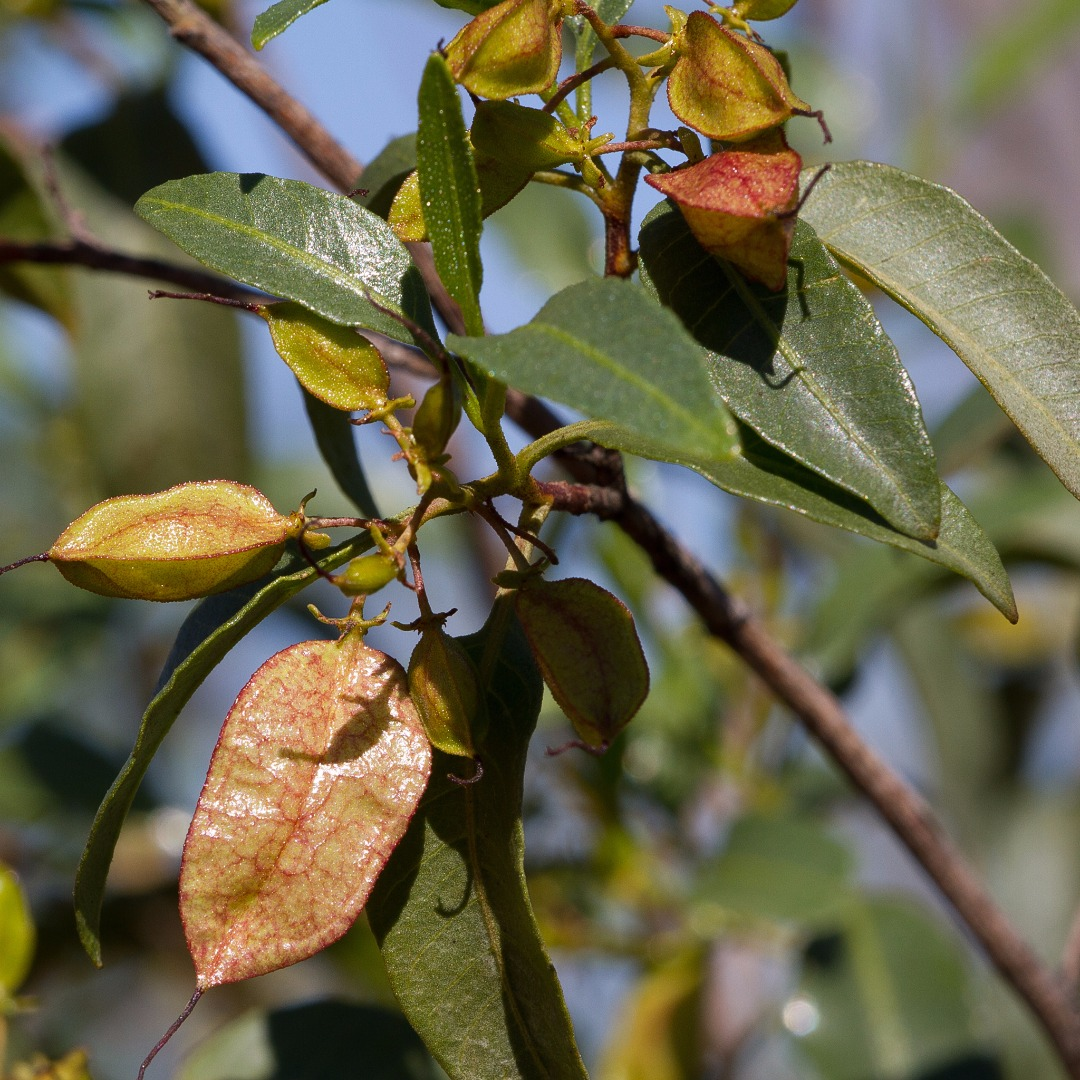

Scientific classification
- Kingdom: Plantae
- Clade: Tracheophytes
- Clade: Angiosperms
- Clade: Eudicots
- Clade: Rosids
- Order: Sapindales
- Family: Sapindaceae
- Genus: Dodonaea
- Species: D. petiolaris

Binomial name
- Dodonaea petiolaris F.Muell.

= Dodonaea petiolaris =

Species of plant

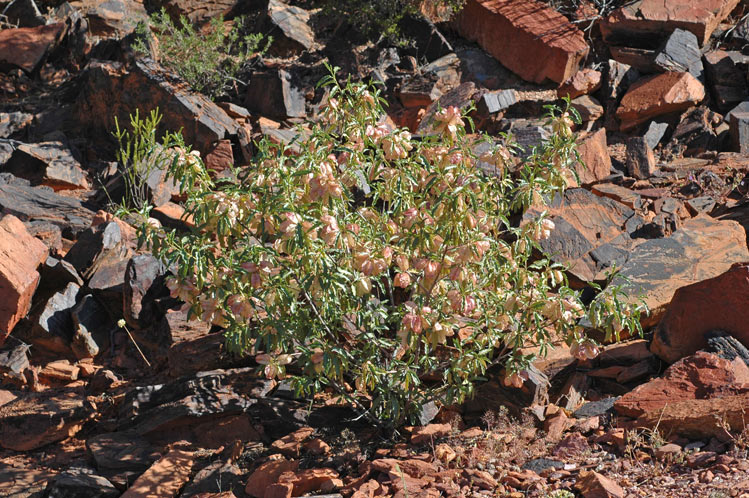
Habit and habitat

Dodonaea petiolaris is a species of plant in the family Sapindaceae and is endemic to Australia. It is an erect, dioecious shrub with simple, broadly lance-shaped to egg-shaped leaves, flowers arranged in panicles, the flowers usually with five sepals and six to ten stamens, and glabrous capsules with three wings.

== Description ==
Dodonaea petiolarisis an erect, dioecious shrub that typically grows to a height of up to 2 m (6 ft 7 in). Its leaves are simple, broadly lance-shaped to egg-shaped, 25–45 mm (0.98–1.77 in) long, 8–25 mm (0.31–0.98 in) wide on a petiole 7.5–14 mm (0.30–0.55 in) long and often grass-like and wavy. The flowers are arranged in panicles on the ends of branches, each flower on a pedicel usually 2.5–5.5 mm (0.098–0.217 in) long, with five linear sepals, 1.2–2.5 mm (0.047–0.098 in) long and six to ten stamens. The ovary is glabrous and the fruit is an oblong to elliptical, inflated three-winged capsule usually 16–30 mm (0.63–1.18 in) long and 12–25 mm (0.47–0.98 in) wide with membranous wings 1.5–4 mm (0.059–0.157 in) wide.

== Taxonomy ==
Dodonaea petiolaris was first formally described in 1862 by Ferdinand von Mueller in his Fragmenta Phytographiae Australiae from specimens collected near the Darling River. The specific epithet (petiolaris) means 'having a petiole'.

== Distribution and habitat ==
This species of Dodonaea grows on rocky hills, and gibber plains in dry and semi-arid areas of central and northern Western Australia, the Northern Territory, and in north-western New South Wales and south-western Queensland.
