= Labdane =

Names
- IUPAC name Labdane
- Systematic IUPAC name (4aR,5S,6S,8aS)-1,1,4a,6-Tetramethyl-5-[(3R)-3-methylpentyl]decahydronaphthalene

Identifiers
CAS Number	561-90-0
3D model (JSmol)	Interactive image
ChEBI	CHEBI:36505
ChEMBL	ChEMBL1087749
ChemSpider	7827634
PubChem CID	9548711
CompTox Dashboard (EPA)	DTXSID80429533
- InChI: InChI=1S/C20H38/c1-7-15(2)9-11-17-16(3)10-12-18-19(4,5)13-8-14-20(17,18)6/h15-18H,7-14H2,1-6H3/t15-,16+,17+,18+,20-/m1/s1 Key: LEWJAHURGICVRE-AISVETHESA-N
- SMILES: C2CC([C@@H]1CC[C@@H]([C@@H]([C@@]1(C)C2)CC[C@H](C)CC)C)(C)C

Properties
Chemical formula	C_{20}H_{38}
Molar mass	278.524 g·mol^{−1}
- Except where otherwise noted, data are given for materials in their standard state (at 25 °C [77 °F], 100 kPa). Infobox references

Labdane is a natural bicyclic diterpene. It forms the structural core for a wide variety of natural products collectively known as labdanes or labdane diterpenes. The labdanes were so named because the first members of the class were originally obtained from labdanum, a resin derived from the gum rockrose.

A variety of biological activities have been determined for labdane diterpenes including antibacterial, antifungal, antiprotozoal, and anti-inflammatory activities. Natural labdanes in tree resin are believed to be the precursors of amber, which polymerise under great pressure.

== Biosynthesis ==
The enzyme (13E)-labda-7,13-dien-15-ol synthase produces the labdane, (13E)-labda-7,13-dien-15-ol, directly from geranylgeranyl pyrophosphate in the lycophyte Selaginella moellendorffii. The reaction proceeds in two steps: cyclisation and then hydrolysis, with pyrophosphate (PP_{i}) as a byproduct.

geranylgeranyl pyrophosphate
H_{2}O
PP_{i}
(13E)-labda-7,13-dien-15-ol

== Example labdane derivatives ==
- Forskolin
- Galanolactone
- Isocupressic acid - is an abortifacient component of Cupressus macrocarpa.
- Medigenin
- Sclareol
- Stemodene

== See also ==
- Abietane
