= Β-Araneosene =

β-Araneosene
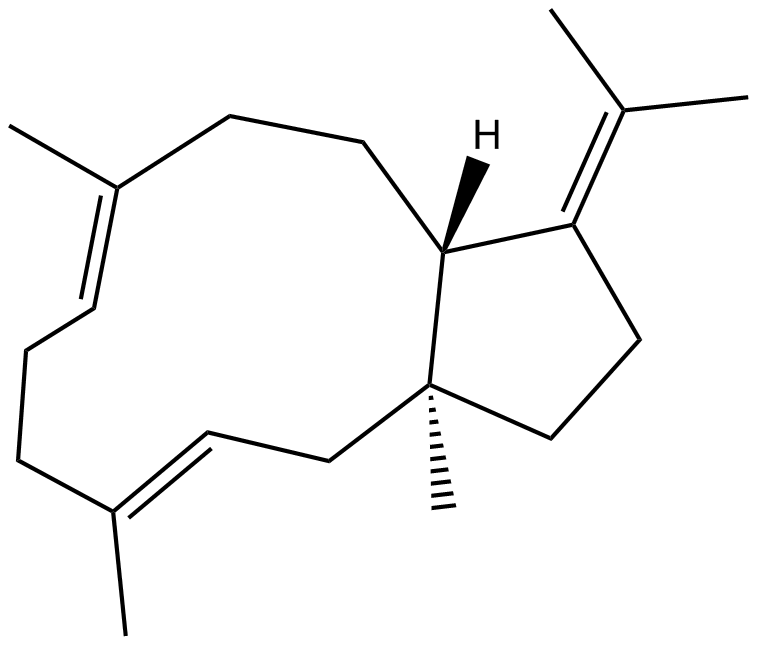

Names
- Preferred IUPAC name (3aS,6E,10E,12aS)-6,10,12a-Trimethyl-3-(propan-2-ylidene)-1,2,3,3a,4,5,8,9,12,12a-decahydrocyclopenta[11]annulene
- Other names Dolabellane

Identifiers
CAS Number	166240-51-3
3D model (JSmol)	Interactive image
ChemSpider	9876501
PubChem CID	11701776
UNII	FEC6HY9PJ7
CompTox Dashboard (EPA)	DTXSID701030401
- InChI: InChI=1S/C20H32/c1-15(2)18-12-14-20(5)13-11-17(4)8-6-7-16(3)9-10-19(18)20/h7,11,19H,6,8-10,12-14H2,1-5H3/b16-7+,17-11+/t19-,20-/m1/s1 Key: VSEDLQDFSQWMRG-WSHNDMGWSA-N; InChI=1/C20H32/c1-15(2)18-12-14-20(5)13-11-17(4)8-6-7-16(3)9-10-19(18)20/h7,11,19H,6,8-10,12-14H2,1-5H3/b16-7+,17-11+/t19-,20-/m1/s1 Key: VSEDLQDFSQWMRG-WSHNDMGWBP
- SMILES: C\2=C(/CC[C@@H]1/C(=C(\C)C)CC[C@@]1(C)C/C=C(\C)CC/2)C

Properties
Chemical formula	C_{20}H_{32}
Molar mass	272.476 g·mol^{−1}
- Except where otherwise noted, data are given for materials in their standard state (at 25 °C [77 °F], 100 kPa). Infobox references

β-Araneosene is a molecule first isolated in 1975 from the mold Sordaria araneosa by Borschberg. This unprecedented diterpene framework was given the name “araneosene”. In 1976, the skeletal class was renamed to “dolabellane” due to the isolation of several compounds containing this framework found from the sea hare Dolabella californica. Since their initial discovery, there are now more than 150 known dolabellanes, mostly isolated from marine sources.

== Biosynthesis ==
The exact biosynthetic pathway of β-araneosene is not known; however, like other diterpenes, it is assumed to originate with geranylgeranyl pyrophosphate. The pyrophosphate dissociates to generate an allylic cation at the tail of the molecule. Next a cascade of cyclizations yields the stable β-araneosene-15-yl cation. Finally, elimination of the adjacent proton yields β–araneosene. It has been proposed that other diterpenes including fusicoccanes, dolastanes, and neodolabellanes also proceed through these intermediates.

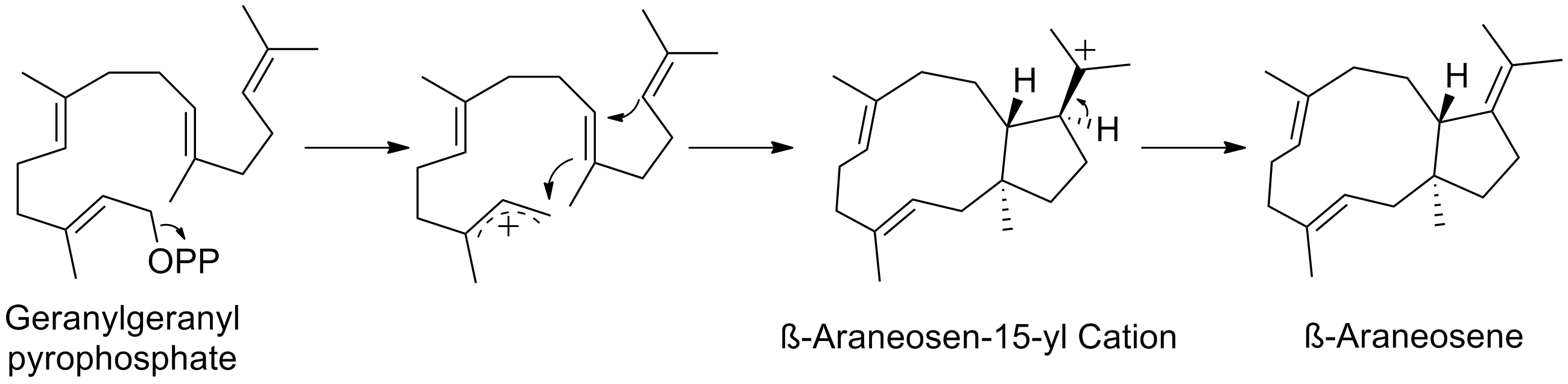
β-Araneosene biosynthesis
