= Sclarene =

- Sclarene

Names
- IUPAC name Labda-8(20),13(16),14-triene
- Systematic IUPAC name (4aS,5S,8aS)-1,1,4a-Trimethyl-6-methylidene-5-(3-methylidenepent-4-en-1-yl)decahydronaphthalene

Identifiers
CAS Number	511-02-4
3D model (JSmol)	Interactive image
ChEBI	CHEBI:64281
ChemSpider	9498211
PubChem CID	11323257
UNII	95E3AV9Y7E
- InChI: InChI=1S/C20H32/c1-7-15(2)9-11-17-16(3)10-12-18-19(4,5)13-8-14-20(17,18)6/h7,17-18H,1-3,8-14H2,4-6H3/t17-,18-,20+/m0/s1 Key: KYLKKZSVPLUGCC-CMKODMSKSA-N
- SMILES: C[C@]12CCCC([C@@H]1CCC(=C)[C@@H]2CCC(=C)C=C)(C)C

Properties
Chemical formula	C_{20}H_{32}
Molar mass	272.476 g·mol^{−1}
- Except where otherwise noted, data are given for materials in their standard state (at 25 °C [77 °F], 100 kPa). verify (what is ?) Infobox references

Sclarene is a diterpene present in the foliage of Podocarpus hallii.
