= Sclareol cyclase =

Class of enzymes

Identifiers
- EC no.: 3.1.7.4
- CAS no.: 146838-18-8

Databases
- IntEnz: IntEnz view
- BRENDA: BRENDA entry
- ExPASy: NiceZyme view
- KEGG: KEGG entry
- MetaCyc: metabolic pathway
- PRIAM: profile
- PDB structures: RCSB PDB PDBe PDBsum
Search
- PMC: articles
- PubMed: articles
- NCBI: proteins

Sclareol cyclase (EC 3.1.7.4, geranylgeranyl pyrophosphate:sclareol cyclase, geranylgeranyl pyrophosphate-sclareol cyclase, GGPP:sclareol cyclase) is an enzyme with systematic name geranylgeranyl-diphosphate diphosphohydrolase (sclareol-forming). This enzyme catalyses the following chemical reaction

geranylgeranyl diphosphate + 2 H_{2}O $\rightleftharpoons$ sclareol + diphosphate

This enzyme requires Mg^{2+} or Mn^{2+} for activity.
