= Co-carcinogen =

A co-carcinogen is a chemical that promotes the effects of a carcinogen in the production of cancer. Usually, the term is used to refer to chemicals that are not carcinogenic on their own, such that an equivalent amount of the chemical is insufficient to initiate carcinogenesis. A chemical can be co-carcinogenic with other chemicals or with nonchemical carcinogens, such as UV radiation.

For example, sodium arsenite can be administered to mice at a low enough concentration that it does not cause tumors on its own, but it increases the rate of formation and size of tumors formed after UV exposure.

A chemical may act as a co-carcinogen even if it does not cause direct DNA damage such as mutation, as long as it can affect a cancer-related pathway. An example of this category includes chemicals within the phorbol ester family, which mimic a native signalling molecule. This ester is not mutagenic, but can increase the rate of cancer by promoting cell growth, a traditional hallmark of cancer.

A chemical may both have anti-carcinogenic properties and yet still be a co-carcinogen in combination with some carcinogens. Additionally, the carcinogenic modifying ability of a chemical can often be dose dependent, where low doses of the compound produce beneficial (or at least non-harmful) results (as in hormesis) while higher doses can lead to a toxic effect.

Evidence points to beta carotene being one example of such a compound, which has led researchers to caution against the emphasis on isolated dietary supplements and instead recommend a focus on promoting a diverse diet rich in fruits and vegetables.

== Classification of co-carcinogen ==
The International Agency for Research on Cancer (IARC), established in 1965 as a subunit of World Health Organization, classify carcinogens into four groups. Co-carcinogen is not in any of these four groups.

- Group 1: Carcinogenic to humans.
- Group 2A: Probably carcinogenic to humans.
- Group 2B: Possibly carcinogenic to humans.
- Group 3: Not classifiable as to its carcinogenicity to humans.
- Group 4: Probably not carcinogenic to humans.
- Co-carcinogen
- Anti-carcinogen

Co-carcinogen does not work as the same way of carcinogenic that having the ability to cause cytopathic effect (CPE) to body cells, tissues and even organs. However, co-carcinogen activates and strengthen the functioning of carcinogenic substance.

== Common co-carcinogens ==
Co-carcinogens can be a lifestyle like cigarette-smoking, alcohol-drinking or even areca nut tobacco-chewing, which is an Asian tradition, because those activities promote the cytopathic effect (CPE). Also, some virus are co-carcinogens like Herpesviruses, Epstein–Barr virus (EBV) and human herpesvirus 4 (HHV-4) Over intake beta carotene for a long period of time increased the risk of lung cancer, prostate cancer and many other kind of malignant tumor for cigarette smoker and worker having high contact with asbestos.

== Issues ==
Tolerable upper intake levels

Experiments for human toxicology require a long term following and a large amount of investment in order to classify a chemical as an co-carcinogen, carcinogen, or anti-carcinogenic. In recent years, people substitute health supplements for healthy meals. Some myths even state beta carotene as elixir in developing countries (the Third World).

With rising health consciousness, people rely on food supplements like vitamins A, B, C, D, E etc. these vitamins act as anti-oxidants chemical in the human body. Antioxidants is a good chemical in the appropriate consumption but a large overdose can cause cellular oxidation and cause cytopathic. Also, the industries can not strictly control the concentration and dose for supplement that extracted from natural food resources. A long-term consumption of those supplement can cause physical burden and also a significant hard work for organ to metabolize. Many health organization and government have published a maximum daily consumption for supplement called tolerable upper intake levels (UL), for example World Health Organization suggest the tolerable upper intake levels of vitamin C is 2000 mg/d for adult men from age 31 to 50. Tolerable upper intake levels is different for different gender and age. These suggested intake level can be followed in order to maintain the public health and safety.

Both animal and human experiment research shows that supplement cannot be the substitution to replace the daily food diet. Having a diverse diet and healthy habits is the better way to stay healthy instead of taking a lots of supplement that might be a co-carcinogen.
