= Taxoid =

Taxoids are a class of derivatives from taxol, that is, paclitaxel. They were developed for their anticancer chemotherapeutic properties. Taxoids are usually treated as synonymous with taxanes; for example, a major medical dictionary defines the two terms with the same definition phrasing, and in another the phrasing varies slightly but conveys nearly identical meaning.

Taxoids are chemically taxane-derived diterpenoids, which do occur in nature, in the genera Taxus and Austrotaxus of yew trees. The taxoids class and the taxanes class both include paclitaxel (trade names Taxol, Abraxane, Onxol, Nov-Onxol) and docetaxel (trade names Taxotere, Docecad).
