= Phorbol esters =

Group of chemical compounds

Chemical structure of 12-O-tetradecanoylphorbol-13-acetate, a phorbol ester

Phorbol esters are a class of chemical compounds found in a variety of plants, particularly in the families Euphorbiaceae and Thymelaeaceae. Chemically, they are ester derivatives of the tetracyclic diterpenoid phorbol.

== Biological activity ==
Protein kinase C (PKC) is a phorbol ester receptor. Phorbol esters can stimulate PKC in a similar way to diglycerides.

Phorbol esters are known for their ability to promote tumors. In particular, 12-O-tetradecanoylphorbol-13-acetate (TPA) is used as a biomedical research tool in models of carcinogenesis.

Plants that contain phorbol esters are often poisonous.
