= Stemarene =

Names
- IUPAC name 13-Methyl-9,12β-ethano-9β-podocarp-13-ene
- Systematic IUPAC name (4aS,6aS,9R,11aR,11bS)-4,4,8,11b-Tetramethyl-1,2,3,4,4a,5,6,6a,9,10,11,11b-dodecahydro-9,11a-methanocyclohepta[a]naphthalene
- Other names (+)-Stemar-13-ene

Identifiers
CAS Number	138883-56-4
3D model (JSmol)	Interactive image
Beilstein Reference	5334696
ChEBI	CHEBI:50069
ChemSpider	21865699
KEGG	C18223
PubChem CID	15161496
CompTox Dashboard (EPA)	DTXSID501027117
- InChI: InChI=1S/C20H32/c1-14-12-16-6-7-17-18(2,3)9-5-10-19(17,4)20(16)11-8-15(14)13-20/h12,15-17H,5-11,13H2,1-4H3/t15-,16+,17+,19+,20-/m1/s1 Key: MCRAOCBPZAIHJQ-QBYKVAOYSA-N; InChI=1/C20H32/c1-14-12-16-6-7-17-18(2,3)9-5-10-19(17,4)20(16)11-8-15(14)13-20/h12,15-17H,5-11,13H2,1-4H3/t15-,16+,17+,19+,20-/m1/s1 Key: MCRAOCBPZAIHJQ-QBYKVAOYBI
- SMILES: CC1=CC2CCC3C(CCCC3(C24CCC1C4)C)(C)C

Properties
Chemical formula	C_{20}H_{32}
Molar mass	272.476 g·mol^{−1}
- Except where otherwise noted, data are given for materials in their standard state (at 25 °C [77 °F], 100 kPa). Infobox references

Stemarene is a diterpene hydrocarbon can be produced biosynthetically through enzyme extracts from rice.
