= Taxane =

Names
- IUPAC name Taxane
- Systematic IUPAC name (4R,4aR,6S,9R,10S,12aS)-4,9,12a,13,13-Pentamethyltetradecahydro-6,10-methanobenzo[10]annulene

Identifiers
CAS Number	1605-68-1
3D model (JSmol)	Interactive image
ChemSpider	7827751
PubChem CID	9548828
- InChI: InChI=1S/C20H36/c1-14-7-6-11-20(5)12-10-17-15(2)8-9-16(13-18(14)20)19(17,3)4/h14-18H,6-13H2,1-5H3/t14-,15-,16+,17+,18-,20+/m1/s1 Key: DKPFODGZWDEEBT-QFIAKTPHSA-N; InChI=1S/C20H36/c1-14-7-6-11-20(5)12-10-17-15(2)8-9-16(13-18(14)20)19(17,3)4/h14-18H,6-13H2,1-5H3/t14-,15-,16+,17+,18-,20+/m1/s1 Key: DKPFODGZWDEEBT-QFIAKTPHSA-N
- SMILES: C[C@@H]1CCC[C@@]2([C@@H]1C[C@@H]3CC[C@H]([C@@H](C3(C)C)CC2)C)C

Properties
Chemical formula	C_{20}H_{36}
Molar mass	276.508 g·mol^{−1}
- Except where otherwise noted, data are given for materials in their standard state (at 25 °C [77 °F], 100 kPa). Infobox references

Taxanes are a class of diterpenes. They were originally identified from plants of the genus Taxus (yews), and feature a taxadiene core. Paclitaxel (Taxol) and docetaxel (Taxotere) are widely used as chemotherapy agents. Cabazitaxel was FDA approved to treat hormone-refractory prostate cancer.

Taxanes present difficulties in formulation as medicines because they are poorly soluble in water.

== Production ==
As their name suggests, taxanes were first derived from natural sources, but some have been semisynthesized. Paclitaxel was originally derived from the Pacific yew tree. Taxanes are difficult to synthesize because of their numerous chiral centres—taxol has 11 of these.

Recently, the presence of taxanes in the shells and leaves of Corylus avellana (the common hazel plant) has been reported.

== Mechanism of action ==
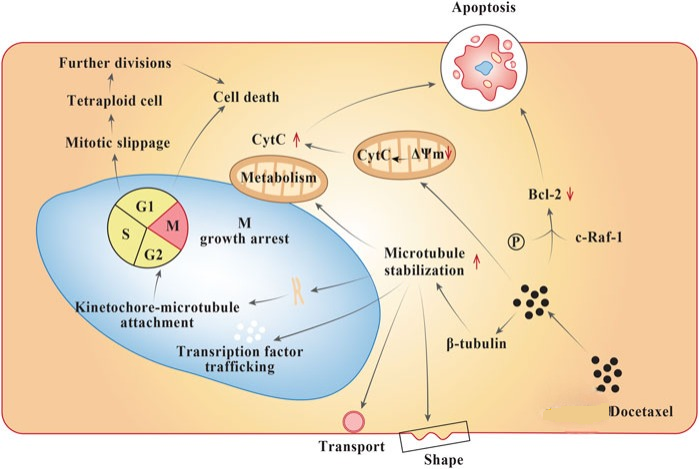
Mechanism of action of taxanes

The principal mechanism of action of the taxane class of drugs is the disruption of microtubule function. Microtubules are essential to cell division, and taxanes stabilize GDP-bound tubulin in the microtubule, thereby inhibiting the process of cell division as depolymerization is prevented. Thus, in essence, taxanes are mitotic inhibitors. In contrast to the taxanes, the vinca alkaloids prevent mitotic spindle formation through inhibition of tubulin polymerization. Both taxanes and vinca alkaloids are, therefore, named spindle poisons or mitosis poisons, but they act in different ways. Taxanes are also thought to be radiosensitizing.

== Substances ==
Hongdoushans A–C are oxygenated taxane diterpenes, isolated from the wood of Taxus wallichiana. Hongdoushan A (C_{29}H_{44}O_{7}), hongdoushan B (C_{27}H_{40}O_{7}), and hongdoushan C (C_{27}H_{42}O_{6}) are reported to have anticancer activity in vitro. Taxuspines A–D have been isolated from Taxus.

Baccatin III (left) Paclitaxel (right)
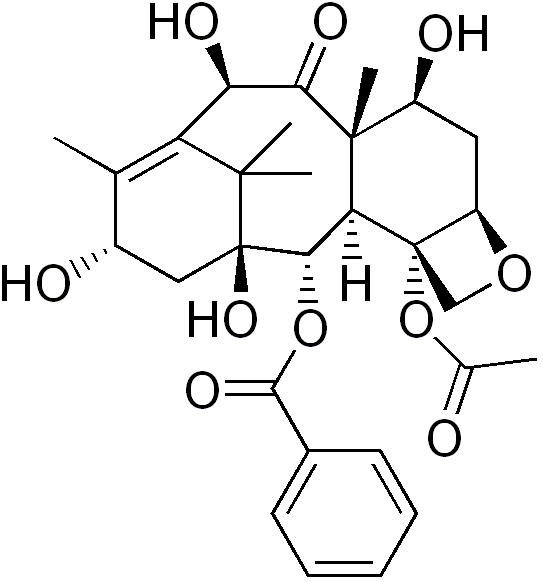
10-Deacetylbaccatin (left) Docetaxel (right)

Taxuspine A

Taxuspine B

Hongdoushan A

== Names ==
Taxanes are usually treated as synonymous with taxoids. The name "taxol" began as a common noun (analogous with other terms in which a genus name root was suffixed with -ol or -in), but it was later capitalized as a trade name, and the international nonproprietary name of the compound is paclitaxel.

== See also ==
- Abeotaxane
- Docetaxel
- Taxine
- Taxuyunnanine
