= Ionomycin =

Names
- IUPAC name (4R,6S,8S,10Z,12R,14R,16E,18R,19R,20S,21S)-19,21-Dihydroxy-22-{(2S,2′R,5S,5′S)-5′-[(1R)-1-hydroxyethyl]-2,5′-dimethyloctahydro-2,2′-bifuran-5-yl}-4,6,8,12,14,18,20-heptamethyl-11-oxido-9-oxodocosa-10,16-dienoic acid

Identifiers
CAS Number	56092-81-0
3D model (JSmol)	Interactive image
ChEMBL	ChEMBL501617; ChEMBL1222121
ChemSpider	5288579
ECHA InfoCard	100.121.355
PubChem CID	6912226
UNII	54V905V6AT
CompTox Dashboard (EPA)	DTXSID2040521
- InChI: InChI=1S/C41H72O9/c1-25(21-29(5)34(43)24-35(44)30(6)22-27(3)20-26(2)14-15-38(46)47)12-11-13-28(4)39(48)31(7)36(45)23-33-16-18-41(10,49-33)37-17-19-40(9,50-37)32(8)42/h11,13,24-33,36-37,39,42-43,45,48H,12,14-23H2,1-10H3,(H,46,47)/b13-11+,34-24-/t25-,26-,27+,28-,29-,30+,31+,32-,33+,36+,37-,39-,40+,41+/m1/s1 Key: PGHMRUGBZOYCAA-ADZNBVRBSA-N; InChI=1/C41H72O9/c1-25(21-29(5)34(43)24-35(44)30(6)22-27(3)20-26(2)14-15-38(46)47)12-11-13-28(4)39(48)31(7)36(45)23-33-16-18-41(10,49-33)37-17-19-40(9,50-37)32(8)42/h11,13,24-33,36-37,39,42-43,45,48H,12,14-23H2,1-10H3,(H,46,47)/b13-11+,34-24-/t25-,26-,27+,28-,29-,30+,31+,32-,33+,36+,37-,39-,40+,41+/m1/s1 Key: PGHMRUGBZOYCAA-ADZNBVRBBY
- SMILES: C[C@H](CCC(=O)O)C[C@H](C)C[C@H](C)C(=O)/C=C(/[C@H](C)C[C@H](C)C/C=C/[C@@H](C)[C@H]([C@@H](C)[C@H](C[C@@H]1CC[C@@](O1)(C)[C@H]2CC[C@@](O2)(C)[C@@H](C)O)O)O)\O

Properties
Chemical formula	C_{41}H_{72}O_{9}
Molar mass	709.0050 g/mol
Solubility	insoluble in water, soluble in fats, DMSO, heptane and hexane
- Except where otherwise noted, data are given for materials in their standard state (at 25 °C [77 °F], 100 kPa). verify (what is ?) Infobox references

Ionomycin is an ionophore and an antibiotic that binds calcium ions (Ca^{2+}) in a ratio 1:1. It is produced by the bacterium Streptomyces conglobatus. It binds also other divalent cations like magnesium and cadmium, but binds Ca^{2+} preferably.

It has 14 chiral centers. Its β-diketone and carboxylic acid group form a chelate with calcium.

It was extracted in 1978 and the complete structure was described in 1979.

It is used in research to raise the intracellular calcium level (Ca^{2+}) and as a research tool to understand Ca^{2+} transport across biological membranes.

Ionomycin is often sold as a free acid, or as a Ca^{2+} salt. Both are insoluble in water, but soluble in fats and DMSO. Because of their fat solubility, they bind to proteins like albumin, which may interfere with their use in studies involving blood.
