= 12-O-Tetradecanoylphorbol-13-acetate =

- TPA

Names
- Preferred IUPAC name (1aR,1bS,4aR,7aS,7bS,8R,9R,9aS)-4a,7b-Dihydroxy-3-(hydroxymethyl)-1,1,6,8-tetramethyl-5-oxo-1,1a,1b,4,4a,5,7a,7b,8,9-decahydro-9aH-cyclopropa[3,4]benzo[1,2-e]azulene-9,9a-diyl 9a-acetate 9-tetradecanoate
- Other names TPA, PMA, Phorbol myristate acetate, Tetradecanoylphorbol acetate.

Identifiers
CAS Number	16561-29-8
3D model (JSmol)	Interactive image; Interactive image
ChEBI	CHEBI:37537
ChEMBL	ChEMBL279115
ChemSpider	25977
ECHA InfoCard	100.109.485
IUPHAR/BPS	2341
KEGG	C05151
PubChem CID	27924
UNII	NI40JAQ945
CompTox Dashboard (EPA)	DTXSID5023798
- InChI: InChI=1S/C36H56O8/c1-7-8-9-10-11-12-13-14-15-16-17-18-29(39)43-32-24(3)35(42)27(30-33(5,6)36(30,32)44-25(4)38)20-26(22-37)21-34(41)28(35)19-23(2)31(34)40/h19-20,24,27-28,30,32,37,41-42H,7-18,21-22H2,1-6H3/t24-,27+,28-,30-,32-,34-,35-,36-/m1/s1 Key: PHEDXBVPIONUQT-RGYGYFBISA-N; InChI=1/C36H56O8/c1-7-8-9-10-11-12-13-14-15-16-17-18-29(39)43-32-24(3)35(42)27(30-33(5,6)36(30,32)44-25(4)38)20-26(22-37)21-34(41)28(35)19-23(2)31(34)40/h19-20,24,27-28,30,32,37,41-42H,7-18,21-22H2,1-6H3/t24-,27+,28-,30-,32-,34-,35-,36-/m1/s1 Key: PHEDXBVPIONUQT-RGYGYFBIBK
- SMILES: CCCCCCCCCCCCCC(=O)O[C@@H]1[C@H]([C@]2([C@@H](C=C(C[C@]3([C@H]2C=C(C3=O)C)O)CO)[C@H]4[C@@]1(C4(C)C)OC(=O)C)O)C; CCCCCCCCCCCCCC(=O)O[C@@H]2C(C)[C@]1(O)C4/C=C(/C)C(=O)[C@@]4(O)CC(\CO)=C/[C@H]1[C@H]3[C@]2(OC(C)=O)C3(C)C

Properties
Chemical formula	C_{36}H_{56}O_{8}
Molar mass	616.83 g/mol
- Except where otherwise noted, data are given for materials in their standard state (at 25 °C [77 °F], 100 kPa). verify (what is ?) Infobox references

12-O-Tetradecanoylphorbol-13-acetate (TPA), also commonly known as tetradecanoylphorbol acetate, tetradecanoyl phorbol acetate, and phorbol 12-myristate 13-acetate (PMA) is a diester of phorbol. It is a potent tumor promoter often employed in biomedical research to activate the signal transduction enzyme protein kinase C (PKC). The effects of TPA on PKC result from its similarity to one of the natural activators of classic PKC isoforms, diacylglycerol. TPA is a small molecule drug.

In ROS biology, superoxide was identified as the major reactive oxygen species induced by TPA/PMA but not by ionomycin in mouse macrophages. Thus, TPA/PMA has been routinely used as an inducer for endogenous superoxide production.

TPA is also being studied as a drug in the treatment of hematologic cancer

TPA has a specific use in cancer diagnostics as a B-cell specific mitogen in cytogenetic testing. Cells must be divided in a cytogenic test to view the chromosomes. TPA is used to stimulate division of B-cells during cytogenetic diagnosis of B-cell cancers such as chronic lymphocytic leukemia.

TPA is also commonly used together with ionomycin to stimulate T-cell activation, proliferation, and cytokine production, and is used in protocols for intracellular staining of these cytokines.

TPA induces KSHV reactivation in PEL cell cultures via stimulation of the mitogen-activated protein kinase (MAPK)/extracellular signal-regulated kinase (ERK) pathway. The pathway involves the activation of the early-immediate viral protein RTA that contributes to the activation of the lytic cycle.

TPA was first found in the Croton plant, a shrub found in Southeast Asia, exposure to which provokes a poison ivy-like rash. It underwent a phase 1 clinical trial.
