= Diterpene =

Organic compound

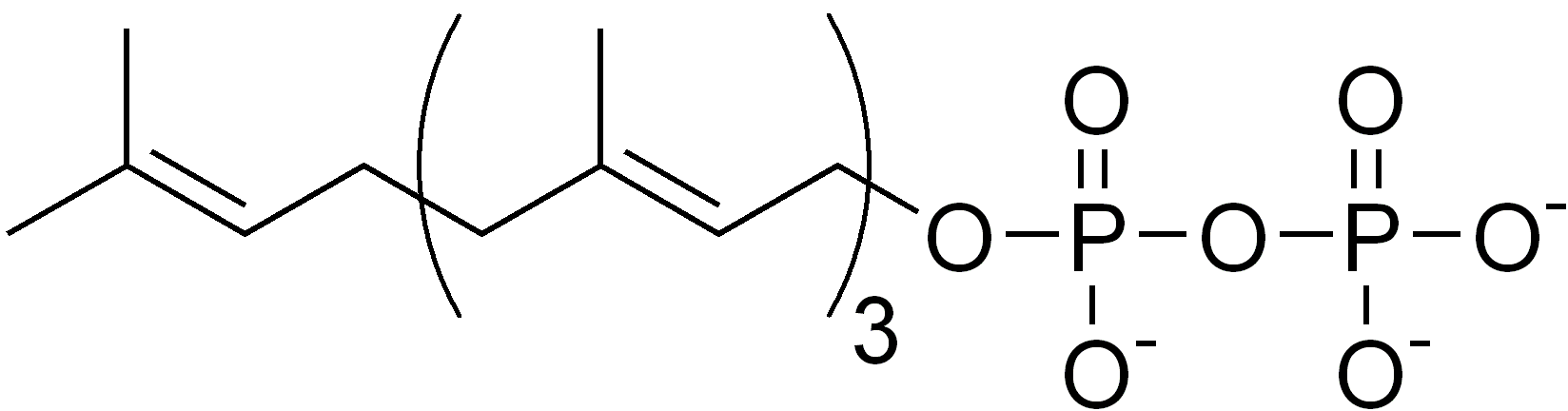
Geranylgeranyl pyrophosphate, the starting material for the biosynthesis of diterpenes

Diterpenes are a class of terpenes composed of four isoprene units, often with the molecular formula C_{20}H_{32}. They are biosynthesized by plants, animals and fungi via the HMG-CoA reductase pathway, with geranylgeranyl pyrophosphate being a primary intermediate. Diterpenes form the basis for biologically important compounds such as retinol, retinal, and phytol. Some diterpenes are antimicrobial and anti-inflammatory.

== Structures ==
Taxadiene: a tricyclic diterpene

As with most terpenes a huge number of potential structures exists, which may be broadly divided according to the number of rings present.

Number of rings	Examples
0	Phytane
1	Cembrene A
2	Sclarene, Labdane
3	Abietane, Taxadiene
4	Stemarene, Stemodene

== Biosynthesis ==
Diterpenes are derived from the addition of one IPP unit to FPP to form geranylgeranyl pyrophosphate (GGPP). From GGPP, structural diversity is achieved mainly by two classes of enzymes; the diterpene synthases and cytochromes P450. Several diterpenes are produced by plants and cyanobacteria. GGPP is also the precursor for the synthesis of the phytane by the action of the enzyme geranylgeranyl reductase. This compound is used for the biosynthesis of tocopherols and the phytyl functional group is used in the formation of chlorophyll a, ubiquinones, plastoquinone and phylloquinone.

== Diterpenoids ==
Retinol, a diterpenoid is one of the animal forms of vitamin A

Phytol, a diterpenoid is used in the biosynthesis of vitamin E and vitamin K1

Diterpenes are formally defined as being hydrocarbons and thus contain no heteroatoms. Functionalized structures should instead be called diterpenoids, although in scientific literature the two terms are often used interchangeably. Although a wide range of terpene structures exist, few of them are biologically significant; by contrast, diterpenoids possess a rich pharmacology and include important compounds such as retinol, phytol or taxadiene.

=== Taxanes ===
Taxanes are class of diterpenoids featuring a taxadiene core. They are produced by plants of the genus Taxus (yew trees) and are widely used as chemotherapy agents.

== Other ==
- Dodonaea petiolaris yields the diterpene ent-3β-acetoxy-15,16-epoxylabda-8(17),13(16),14-trien-18-oic acid (C_{22}H_{28}O_{6}) or its enantiomer.
- Salvia divinorum yields Salvinorin A, a psychotropic drug

== See also ==
- Abeotaxane
- Cafestol
- Kahweol
- Monoterpene
- Sesquiterpene
- Triterpene
