= Taxadiene =

Names
- IUPAC name Taxa-4,11-diene
- Systematic IUPAC name (4aS,6S,12aS)-4,9,12a-Trimethyl-1,2,4a,5,6,7,8,11,12,12a-decahydro-6,10-methanobenzo[10]annulene

Identifiers
CAS Number	163594-75-0
3D model (JSmol)	Interactive image
ChemSpider	391697
PubChem CID	443484
CompTox Dashboard (EPA)	DTXSID40167621
- InChI: InChI=1S/C20H32/c1-14-7-6-11-20(5)12-10-17-15(2)8-9-16(13-18(14)20)19(17,3)4/h7,16,18H,6,8-13H2,1-5H3/t16-,18+,20-/m0/s1 Key: FRJSECSOXKQMOD-HQRMLTQVSA-N; InChI=1/C20H32/c1-14-7-6-11-20(5)12-10-17-15(2)8-9-16(13-18(14)20)19(17,3)4/h7,16,18H,6,8-13H2,1-5H3/t16-,18+,20-/m0/s1 Key: FRJSECSOXKQMOD-HQRMLTQVBK
- SMILES: C\1(=C2/CC[C@]3(C)CC/C=C(/C)[C@H]3C[C@H](CC/1)C2(C)C)C

Properties
Chemical formula	C_{20}H_{32}
Molar mass	272.476 g·mol^{−1}
- Except where otherwise noted, data are given for materials in their standard state (at 25 °C [77 °F], 100 kPa). Infobox references

Taxadiene (taxa-4,11-diene) is a diterpene. Taxadiene is the first committed intermediate in the synthesis of taxol. Six hydroxylation reactions, and a few others, are needed to convert taxadiene to baccatin III.

Enzymatically, taxadiene is produced from geranylgeranyl pyrophosphate by taxadiene synthase. A biochemical gram-scale production of taxadiene has been reported in 2010 using genetically engineered Escherichia coli.
