= Docetaxel =

Chemotherapy medication

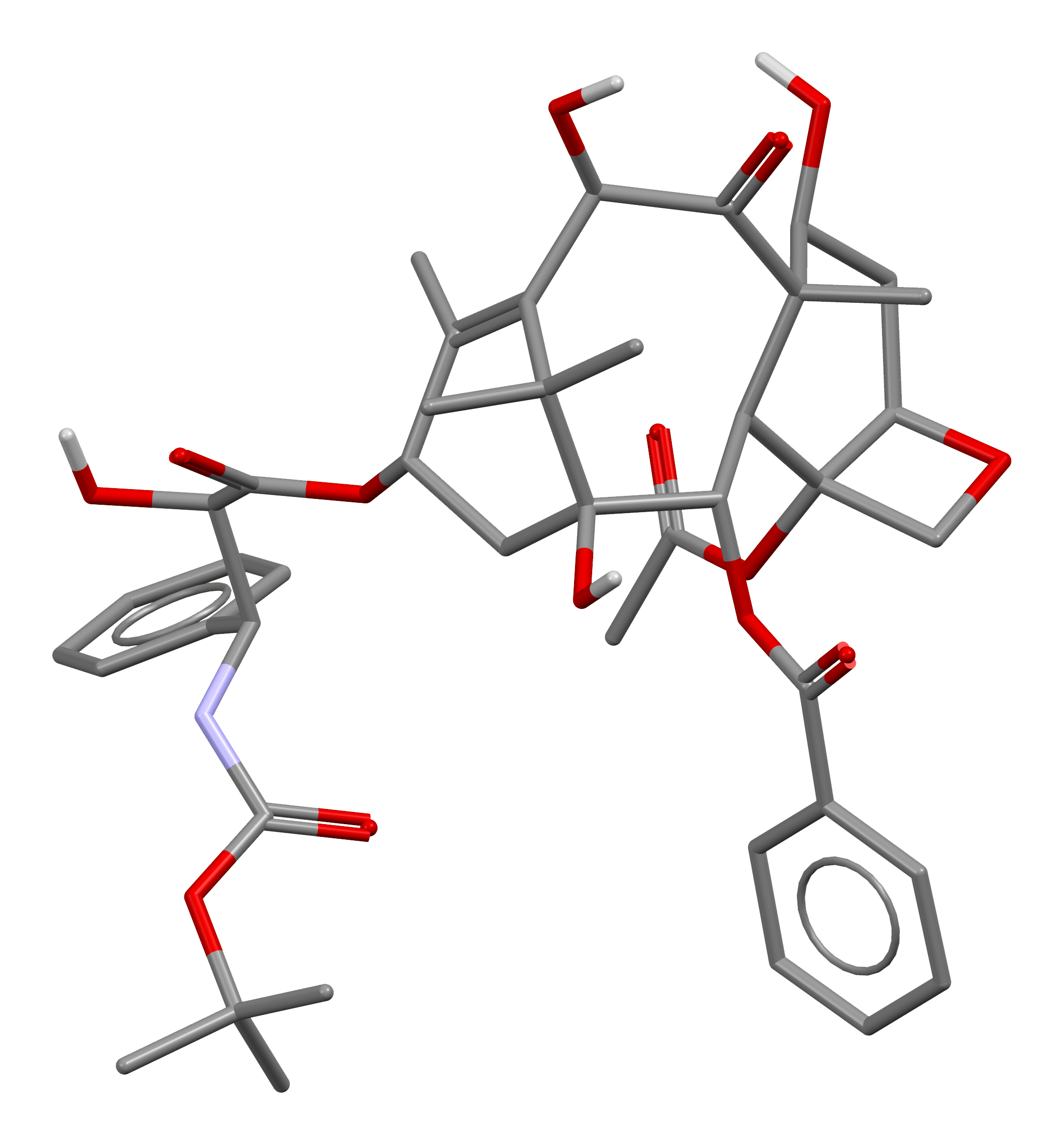

Clinical data
- Trade names: Taxotere, Docecad, Docefrez, others
- AHFS/Drugs.com: Monograph
- MedlinePlus: a696031
- License data: US DailyMed: Docetaxel
- Pregnancy category: AU: D
- Routes of administration: Intravenous
- ATC code: L01CD02 (WHO)

Legal status
- Legal status: AU: S4 (Prescription only); US: ℞-only; EU: Rx-only; In general: ℞ (Prescription only)

Pharmacokinetic data
- Bioavailability: NA
- Protein binding: >98%
- Metabolism: Liver
- Elimination half-life: 11 hours
- Excretion: Bile duct

Identifiers
- IUPAC name: 1,7β,10β-trihydroxy-9-oxo-5β,20-epoxytax-11-ene-2α,4,13α-triyl 4-acetate 2-benzoate 13-{(2R,3S)-3-[(tert-butoxycarbonyl)amino]-2-hydroxy-3-phenylpropanoate}
- CAS Number: 114977-28-5
- PubChem CID: 148124
- IUPHAR/BPS: 6809
- DrugBank: DB01248
- ChemSpider: 130581
- UNII: 699121PHCA
- KEGG: D07866
- ChEBI: CHEBI:4672
- ChEMBL: ChEMBL92
- CompTox Dashboard (EPA): DTXSID0040464
- ECHA InfoCard: 100.129.246

Chemical and physical data
- Formula: C_{43}H_{53}NO_{14}
- Molar mass: 807.890 g·mol^{−1}
- 3D model (JSmol): Interactive image
- SMILES: O=C(OC(C)(C)C)N[C@@H](c1ccccc1)[C@@H](O)C(=O)O[C@@H]4C(=C3/[C@@H](O)C(=O)[C@]6([C@H]([C@H](OC(=O)c2ccccc2)[C@@](O)(C3(C)C)C4)[C@@]5(OC(=O)C)[C@H](OC5)C[C@@H]6O)C)/C
- InChI: InChI=1S/C43H53NO14/c1-22-26(55-37(51)32(48)30(24-15-11-9-12-16-24)44-38(52)58-39(3,4)5)20-43(53)35(56-36(50)25-17-13-10-14-18-25)33-41(8,34(49)31(47)29(22)40(43,6)7)27(46)19-28-42(33,21-54-28)57-23(2)45/h9-18,26-28,30-33,35,46-48,53H,19-21H2,1-8H3,(H,44,52)/t26-,27-,28+,30-,31+,32+,33-,35-,41+,42-,43+/m0/s1; Key:ZDZOTLJHXYCWBA-VCVYQWHSSA-N

Docetaxel (DTX or DXL), sold under the brand name Taxotere among others, is a chemotherapy medication used to treat a number of types of cancer. This includes breast cancer, head and neck cancer, stomach cancer, prostate cancer and non-small-cell lung cancer. It may be used by itself or along with other chemotherapy medication. It is given by slow injection into a vein.

Common side effects include hair loss, cytopenia (low blood cell counts), numbness, shortness of breath, nausea, vomiting, and muscle pains. Other severe side effects include allergic reactions and future cancers. Docetaxel-induced pneumotoxicity is also a well recognized adverse effect which has to be identified timely and treated after withholding the drug. Side effects are more common in people with liver problems. Use during pregnancy may harm the fetus. Docetaxel is in the taxane family of medications. It works by disrupting the normal function of microtubules and thereby stopping cell division.

Docetaxel was patented in 1986 and approved for medical use in 1995. It is on the World Health Organization's List of Essential Medicines. Docetaxel is available as a generic medication.

== Medical uses ==
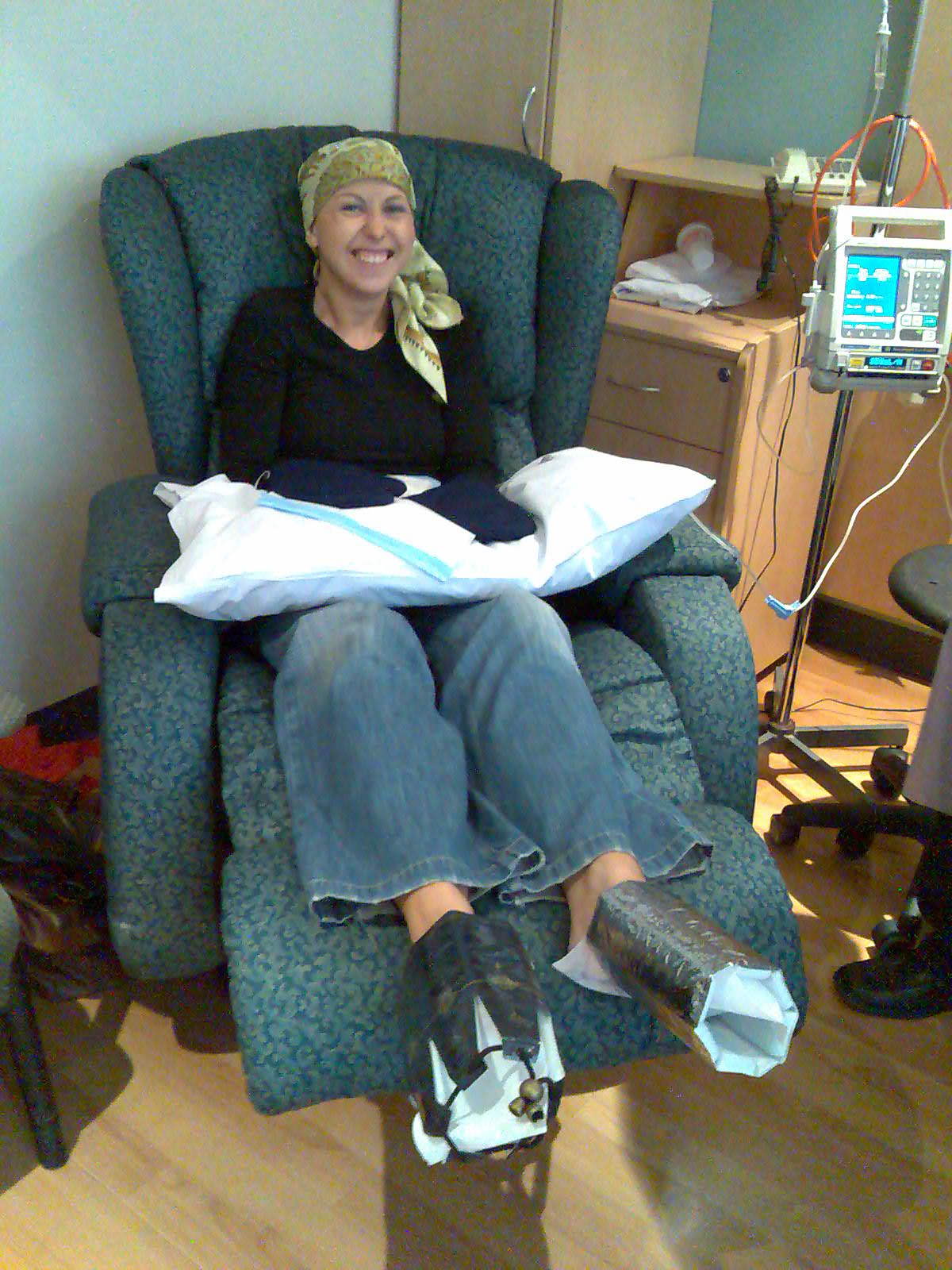
A woman being treated with docetaxel chemotherapy for breast cancer. Cold mittens and wine coolers are placed on her hands and feet to prevent deleterious effects on the nails. Similar strategies can be used to prevent hair loss.

Docetaxel is used in the treatment of various cancers, including breast, lung, prostate, gastric, head and neck, and ovarian cancer. Clinical data have shown docetaxel to have cytotoxic activity against breast, colorectal, lung, ovarian, prostate, liver, renal, gastric, and head and neck cancers and melanoma. In hormone-refractory prostate cancer docetaxel improves life expectancy and overall life quality.

The optimal dose scheduling of taxanes remains unconfirmed, but most studies find significant mortality benefit following either a three-week or a one-week administration schedule. While a 2010 article in Current Clinical Pharmacology states, "weekly administration has emerged as the optimal schedule," the official docetaxel package insert recommends administration every three weeks.

=== Outcomes ===
Treatment with docetaxel increases survival time in people with certain types of cancer. While some clinical trials show median survival times to be increased by approximately only three months, the range of survival time is large. Many people survive beyond five years with treatment from docetaxel, however it is difficult to attribute these findings directly to treatment with docetaxel. Improved median survival time and response indicates that docetaxel slows metastatic cancer progression and can lead to disease-free survival. Conjunctive treatment of prednisone with docetaxel has been shown to lead to improved survival rate as well as improved quality of life and reduction of pain compared with treatments with mitoxantrone.

As well as inhibiting mitosis, the presence of docetaxel has been found to lead to the phosphorylation of the oncoprotein bcl-2, which leads to apoptosis of cancer cells that had previously blocked the apoptotic inducing mechanism, leading to tumour regression. Enhanced effects of radiation therapy when combined with docetaxel has been observed in mice. Docetaxel has also been found to have greater cellular uptake and is retained longer intracellularly than paclitaxel allowing docetaxel treatment to be effective with a smaller dose, leading to fewer and less severe adverse effects.

=== Breast cancer ===
Docetaxel and paclitaxel have comparable efficacy metastatic breast cancer but paclitaxel has less severe side effects. Additionally, it has been noted that docetaxel is prone to cellular drug resistance via a variety of different mechanisms.

=== Monitoring and combination use ===
Docetaxel is administered via a one-hour infusion every three weeks over ten or more cycles. Treatment is given under the supervision of an oncologist. Strict monitoring of blood cell counts, liver function, serum electrolytes, serum creatinine, heart function, oxygen saturation and fluid retention is required detect adverse reactions and toxicity so that treatment can be modified or terminated if necessary.

Premedication with corticosteroids is recommended before each administration of docetaxel to reduce fluid retention and hypersensitive reactions. Other medications will often be given to aid pain management and other symptoms. The treatment of breast cancer with doxorubicin and cyclophosphamide is enhanced by adjuvant treatment with docetaxel. Docetaxel is also used in combination with capecitabine, a DNA synthesis inhibitor.

== Side effects ==
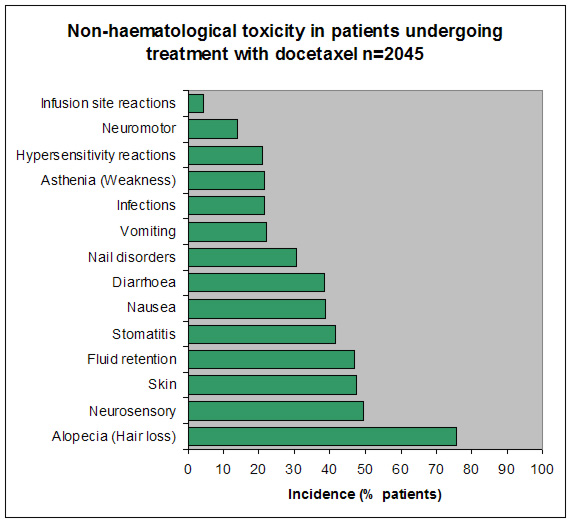
Incidence of commonly experienced non-haematological adverse effects reported for treatment with docetaxel. Data from 40 phase II and phase III studies (n = 2045) with patients undergoing a one-hour infusion of 100 mg/m^{2} docetaxel once every three weeks.

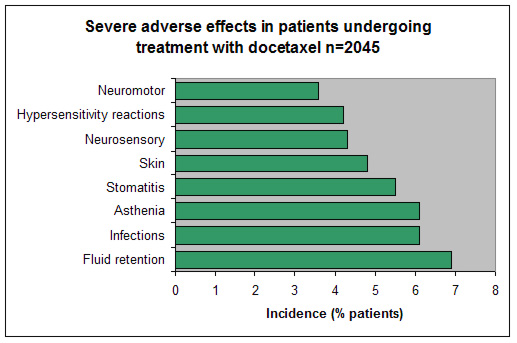
Incidence of severe adverse effects reported in patients treated with docetaxel. Data from 40 phase II and phase III studies with patients undergoing a one-hour infusion of 100 mg/m^{2} docetaxel once every three weeks.

Docetaxel is a cytotoxic chemotherapeutic agent. As with all chemotherapy, adverse effects are common, and many side effects have been documented. Because docetaxel is a cell-cycle-specific agent, it is cytotoxic to all dividing cells in the body. This includes tumour cells as well as hair follicles, bone marrow and other germ cells. For this reason, common chemotherapy side effects such as hair loss occur; sometimes this can be permanent. North west France are conducting a survey to establish exactly how many people are affected in this way. Independent studies show it could be as high as 6.3%, which puts it in the 'common and frequent' classification.

Haematological adverse effects include neutropenia (95.5%), anaemia (90.4%), febrile neutropenia (11.0%) and thrombocytopenia (8.0%). Deaths due to toxicity accounted for 1.7% of the 2045 patients, and incidence was increased (9.8%) in patients with elevated baseline liver function tests (liver dysfunction).

The use of docetaxel during chemotherapy, especially when given weekly, may lead to complications with the lacrimal drainage system. The mechanism for this problem seems to be secretion of docetaxel by the lacrimal gland which can then cause stenosis, or narrowing, of the punctum and canalicular outflow system. In most cases the primary symptoms is epiphora or tearing. When treated early most patients can avoid the need for surgery, but some cases the only cure is a conjunctivodacryocystorhinostomy in which a glass tube is placed to bypass the tear duct.

Taxane-induced pneumotoxicity is rare. However, 1–5% of patients taking docetaxel may develop severe pneumotoxicity. Patients may develop exertional breathlessness and desaturation which needs to be detected early. Chest X-Ray may show bilateral opacities and High Resolution CT chest may reveal Organizing Pneumonia (OP) pattern or Non-Specific Organizing Pneumonia (NSIP) pattern or a combination. Docetaxel-induced DPLD is a fatal adverse effect, which can be managed by the cessation of the drug and starting on steroids in adequate doses.

Many more side effects have been reported for conjunctive and adjuvant treatment with docetaxel as well as rare post-marketing events.

=== Contraindications and patient factors ===
Docetaxel is contraindicated for use with patients with a baseline neutrophil count less than 1500 cells/μL, a history of severe hypersensitivity reactions to docetaxel or polysorbate 80, severe liver impairment and pregnant or breast-feeding women.

Side effects are experienced more frequently by patients of 65 years or older, but dosage is usually not decreased. Kidney failure is thought not to be a significant factor for docetaxel dosage adjustment. Patients with hepatic insufficiency resulting in serum bilirubin greater than the upper limit of normal (ULN) should not be administered docetaxel, though this is not a stated contraindication. Dosage should be reduced by 20% in people who develop grade 3 or 4 diarrhea following exposure to docetaxel, hepatotoxicity defined by liver enzymes at levels greater than five times the ULN, and grade 2 palmer-planter toxicity.

Paediatric trials of docetaxel have been limited, and so safety of use in patients under 16 years has not been established.

=== Pregnancy ===
Based on the limited data available, docetaxel appears to be safe in pregnancy if administered during the second and third trimesters; however, maternal and fetal risks should be weighed against benefits to determine the appropriate course of action. As with all chemotherapeutic agents, docetaxel administered to pregnant animals causes a variety of embryofetal toxicities, including death, when given during the period of organogenesis. Yet adequate studies investigating maternal and fetal effects in humans are lacking. One small systematic review that examined the use of taxanes to treat breast cancer in pregnancy showed that, out of 19 patients, only three congenital malformations occurred. Two cases of cerebral ventriculomegaly observed in the study were documented prior to the administration of chemotherapy, suggesting an alternate cause of congenital malformation. The third case involved pyloric stenosis in an infant whose mother received a combination regimen of docetaxel, doxorubicin, cyclophosphamide and paclitaxel; because the fetus was exposed to multiple drugs in utero, it remains difficult to identify docetaxel as the causative teratogenic agent. Further studies are needed to better assess the safety of docetaxel in pregnancy and determine appropriate dosing in pregnant women.

=== Drug interactions ===
Drug interactions may be the result of altered pharmacokinetics or pharmacodynamics due to one of the drugs involved. Cisplatin, dexamethasone, doxorubicin, etoposide, and vinblastine are all potentially co-administered with docetaxel and did not modify docetaxel plasma binding in phase II studies. Cisplatin is known to have a complex interaction with some CYPs and has in some events been shown to reduce docetaxel clearance by up to 25%. Anticonvulsants induce some metabolic pathways relevant to docetaxel. CYP450 and CYP3A show increased expression in response to the use of anticonvulsants and the metabolism of docetaxel metabolite M4 is processed by these CYPs. A corresponding increase in clearance of M4 by 25% is observed in patients taking phenytoin and phenobarbital, common anticonvulsants.

Common and/or likely drug-drug combinations and known side effects from drug interactions
Drug interacting with docetaxel	Adverse effects from interaction
Cisplatin	Increased risk of delayed neuropathy
Cyclosporine, dalfopristin, erythromycin, itraconazole, ketoconazole, quinupristin, terfenadine, troleandomycin	Increased risk of docetaxel toxicity including some or all of the following: anaemia, leucopoenia, thrombocytopenia, fever, diarrhoea
Doxorubicin hydrochloride	Cholestatic jaundice and pseudomembranous colitis
Doxorubicin hydrochloride liposome	Increased doxorubicin exposure
Vaccinations for Bacillus of Calmette and Guerin, measles, mumps, poliovirus, rotavirus, rubella, smallpox, typhoid, varicella, yellow fever	Increased risk of infection by live vaccine
Thalidomide	Increased risk of venous thromboembolism

Erythromycin, ketoconazole and cyclosporine are CYP3A4 inhibitors and therefore inhibit the metabolic pathway of docetaxel. When used with anticonvulsants, which induce CYP3A4, an increased dose of docetaxel may be required.

Pre-treatment with corticosteroids has been used to decrease hypersensitivity reactions and oedema in response to docetaxel and has shown no effect on the pharmacokinetics of docetaxel. The efficacy of docetaxel was improved by treatment with oral capecitabine, and after more than 27 months follow-up the survival benefit has been confirmed. Doxorubicin was combined with docetaxel in one study of 24 patients and resulted in an increased AUC of docetaxel by 50 to 70%, indicating doxorubicin may affect the disposition of docetaxel. Etoposide has also been shown to decrease docetaxel clearance, though patient numbers for this observation have been low.

Prednisone given with docetaxel led to improved survival, quality of life and pain management in patients with hormone-refractory prostate cancer.

== Chemistry ==
Docetaxel is of the chemotherapy drug class taxane and is a semi-synthetic analogue of paclitaxel (Taxol), an extract from the bark of the rare Pacific yew tree, Taxus brevifolia. Due to scarcity of paclitaxel, extensive research was carried out leading to the formulation of docetaxel – an esterified product of 10-deacetyl baccatin III, which is extracted from the renewable and more readily available leaves of the European yew tree.

Docetaxel differs from paclitaxel at two positions in its chemical structure. It has a hydroxyl functional group on carbon 10, whereas paclitaxel has an acetate ester, and a tert-butyl carbamate ester exists on the phenylpropionate side chain instead of the benzamide in paclitaxel. The carbon 10 functional group change causes docetaxel to be more water-soluble than paclitaxel.

=== Formulations and compositions ===
Docetaxel is a white powder and is the active ingredient available in 20 mg and 80 mg Taxotere single-dose vials of concentrated anhydrous docetaxel in polysorbate 80. The solution is a clear brown-yellow containing 40 mg docetaxel and 1040 mg polysorbate 80 per mL. 20 mg Taxotere is distributed in a blister carton containing one single-dose vial of Taxotere (docetaxel) preparation in 0.5 mL sterile pyrogen-free anhydrous polysorbate 80, and a single dose Taxotere solvent vial containing 1.5 mL 13% ethanol in saline to be combined and diluted in a 250 mL infusion bag containing 0.9% sodium chloride or 5% glucose for administration. 80 mg Taxotere is supplied identically but with 2.0 mL polysorbate 80 and 6.0 mL 13% ethanol in saline. The docetaxel and solvent vials are combined to give a solution of 10 mg/mL and the required dose is drawn from this solution. Vials have an overfill to compensate for liquid loss during preparation, foaming, adhesion to vial walls and the dead volume. 20 mg vials may be stored for 24 months below 25 °C away from light and 80 mg vials for 26 months in the same conditions.

Recently Sanofi has got approval for one-vial formulation. With this one-vial formulation, the preparation of the infusion solution is simplified by eliminating the first dilution step. The two-vial and one-vial formulations contain the same drug substance, docetaxel trihydrate, and the same excipients (ethanol, polysorbate 80 and citric acid). The one-vial formulation is administered as an aqueous intravenous solution that contains the same drug substance in the same concentration as the already approved two-vial formulation. The same grade, quality, and quantity of polysorbate 80 are present in the infusion solution of both formulations. The only difference between these two formulations is the quantity of ethanol.

=== Active regions ===
A model based on electron crystallographic density and nuclear magnetic resonance deconvolution has been proposed to explain the binding of docetaxel to β-tubulin. In this T-shaped/butterfly model, a deep hydrophobic cleft exists near the surface of the β-tubulin where three potential hydrogen bonds and multiple hydrophobic contacts bind to docetaxel. The hydrophobic pocket walls contain helices H1, H6, H7 and a loop between H6 and H7 that form hydrophobic interactions with the 3'-benzamido phenyl, 3'-phenyl, and the 2-benzoyl phenyl of docetaxel. 3'-phenyl also has contact with β-sheets B8 and B10. The C-8 methyl of docetaxel has Van der Waals interactions with two residues, Thr-276 and Gln-281 near the C-terminal end of β-tubulin. Docetaxel's O-21 experiences electrostatic attraction to Thr-276 and the C-12 methyl has proximity with Leu-371 on the loop between B9 and B10.

== Pharmacokinetics ==
=== Absorption and distribution ===
Oral bioavailability has been found to be 8% ±6% on its own and, when co-administered with cyclosporine, bioavailability increased to 90% ± 44%. In practice, docetaxel is administered intravenously only to increase dose precision. Evaluation of docetaxel pharmacokinetics in phase II and III clinical studies were with 100 mg/m^{2} dosages given over one-hour infusions every three weeks.

Docetaxel was shown to be greater than 98% plasma protein bound independent of concentration at 37 °C and pH 7.4 Docetaxel's plasma protein binding includes lipoproteins, alpha1 acid glycoprotein and albumin. Alpha1 acid glycoprotein is the most variable of these proteins inter-individually, especially in cancer patients and is therefore the main determinant of docetaxel's plasma binding variability. Docetaxel interacted little with erythrocytes and was unaffected by the polysorbate 80 in its storage medium. Polysorbate 80 may be the cause of hypersensitivity reasons in taxanes as recent studies indicated.

The concentration-time profile of docetaxel was consistent with a three-compartment pharmacokinetic model. An initial, relatively rapid decline, with an α half-life of mean 4.5 minutes is representative of distribution to peripheral compartments from the systemic circulation. A β half-life of mean 38.3 minutes and a relatively slow γ half-life of mean 12.2 hours represent the slow efflux of docetaxel from the peripheral compartment.

Administration a 100 mg/m^{2} dose over a one-hour infusion gave a mean total body clearance of 21 L/h/m^{2} and a mean steady state volume of distribution of 73.8 L/m^{2} or 123 L based on the mean BSA (body surface area) of 1.68 m^{2}. Area under the plasma concentration-time curve had a mean value of 2.8 mg.h/L. The Cmax of docetaxel was found to be 4.15 ± 1.35 mg/L. Increased dose resulted in a linear increase of the area under the concentration-time curve and so it is concluded that dose is directly proportional to plasma concentration.

=== Metabolism and excretion ===
Docetaxel is mainly metabolised in the liver by the cytochrome P450 CYP3A4 and CYP3A5 subfamilies of isoenzymes. Metabolism is principally oxidative and at the tert-butylpropionate side chain, resulting first in an alcohol docetaxel (M2), which is then cyclised to three further metabolites (M1, M3 and M4). M1 and M3 are two diastereomeric hydroxyoxazolidinones and M4 is an oxazolidinedione. Phase II trials of 577 patients showed docetaxel clearance is related to body surface area and to hepatic enzyme and alpha1 acid glycoprotein plasma levels. The following model represents docetaxel clearance in humans:

CL = BSA · (22.1 − 3.55·AAG − 0.095·AGE + 0.2245·ALB) · (1 − 0.334·HEP12)

where CL is total body clearance (L/h), BSA is total body surface area (m^{2}), AAG and ALB represent alpha1 acid glycoprotein and albumin plasma concentrations (g/L) respectively, and AGE is the patients age (years). HEP12 represents a measure of hepatic dysfunction, affecting clearance of docetaxel. This final model accounted for a modest proportion of patients and identified most of the patients varying from the model (population median of CL = 35.6 L/h) as having hepatic dysfunction, indicating hepatic function as the most unpredictable factor with regards to clearance variability.

Patients with significant hepatic dysfunction had an approximately 30% decrease in clearance of docetaxel and were also at a higher risk of toxicity poisoning from docetaxel treatment. Clearance has been shown from population pharmacokinetic studies to decrease significantly with age, increased alpha1 acid glycoprotein and albumin concentrations and decreased body surface area.

Renal impairment is unlikely to affect metabolism or excretion of docetaxel as renal excretion contributes less than 5% of elimination. Limited data is available for docetaxel use in children with dosage between 55 and 75 mg/m^{2}. Two paediatric studies have taken place that show a mean clearance of 33 L/h/m^{2} and concentration-time profiles best fitted by a two-compartmental model of distribution and elimination. Mean distribution half-life was 0.09 hours and mean elimination half-life was 1.4 hours in paediatric studies.

Biodistribution of 14C-labelled docetaxel in three patients showed the bulk of the drug to be metabolised and excreted in bile to the faeces. Of the radioactively labelled docetaxel administered, 80% was eliminated to the faeces with 5% in the urine over seven days, an indication that urinary excretion of docetaxel is minimal. Saliva contributed minimal excretion and no excretion was detected through pulmonary means. The terminal half-life of docetaxel was determined as approximately 86 hours, through prolonged plasma sampling, contrary to the clinically stated terminal half-life of 10–18 hours.

== Mechanism of action ==
=== Molecular target ===
Docetaxel binds to microtubules reversibly with high affinity and has a maximum stoichiometry of 1 mole docetaxel per mole tubulin in microtubules. This binding stabilizes microtubules and prevents depolymerisation from calcium ions, decreased temperature and dilution, preferentially at the plus end of the microtubule. Docetaxel has been found to accumulate to higher concentration in ovarian adenocarcinoma cells than kidney carcinoma cells, which may contribute to the more effective treatment of ovarian cancer by docetaxel. It has also been found to lead to the phosphorylation of oncoprotein bcl-2, which is apoptosis-blocking in its oncoprotein form.

=== Modes of action ===
The cytotoxic activity of docetaxel is exerted by promoting and stabilising microtubule assembly, while preventing physiological microtubule depolymerisation/disassembly in the absence of GTP. This leads to a significant decrease in free tubulin, needed for microtubule formation and results in inhibition of mitotic cell division between metaphase and anaphase, preventing further cancer cell progeny.

Because microtubules do not disassemble in the presence of docetaxel, they accumulate inside the cell and cause initiation of apoptosis. Apoptosis is also encouraged by the blocking of apoptosis-blocking bcl-2 oncoprotein. Both in vitro and in vivo analysis show the anti-neoplastic activity of docetaxel to be effective against a wide range of known cancer cells, cooperate with other anti-neoplastic agents activity, and have greater cytotoxicity than paclitaxel, possibly due to its more rapid intracellular uptake.

The main mode of therapeutic action of docetaxel is the suppression of microtubule dynamic assembly and disassembly, rather than microtubule bundling leading to apoptosis, or the blocking of bcl-2.

=== Cellular responses ===
Docetaxel exhibits cytotoxic activity on breast, colorectal, lung, ovarian, gastric, renal and prostate cancer cells. Docetaxel does not block disassembly of interphase microtubules and so does not prevent entry into the mitotic cycle, but does block mitosis by inhibiting mitotic spindle assembly. This can lead to mitotic catastrophe. Resistance to paclitaxel or anthracycline doxorubicin does not necessarily indicate resistance to docetaxel. Microtubules formed in the presence of docetaxel are of a larger size than those formed in the presence of paclitaxel, which may result in improved cytotoxic efficacy. Abundant formation of microtubules and the prevention of replication caused by docetaxel leads to apoptosis of tumour cells and is the basis of docetaxel use as a cancer treatment. Docetaxel activity is significantly greater in ovarian and breast tumours than for lung tumours.

== Society and culture ==
=== Discovery, regulation and marketing ===
Docetaxel is marketed worldwide under the name Taxotere by Sanofi-Aventis as well as Docefrez by Sun Pharma Global and Zytax by Zydus. Annual sales of Taxotere in 2010 were €2.122 billion (US$3.1 billion). The patent expired in 2010.

Docetaxel was developed by Rhône-Poulenc Rorer (now Sanofi-Aventis) following from the discoveries of Pierre Potier at CNRS at Gif-sur-Yvette during his work on improvements to the production of paclitaxel (Taxol) using the local European yew.

=== Costs ===
In the UK (in 2009) The cost of six cycles (18 weeks) of docetaxel at a dose of 75 mg/m2 IV every 21 days is £5,262 (based on an average body surface area 1.75 m^{2}).
