= Wood =

Fibrous material from trees or other plants

Characteristic grain patterns, colour and appearance of selected wood species
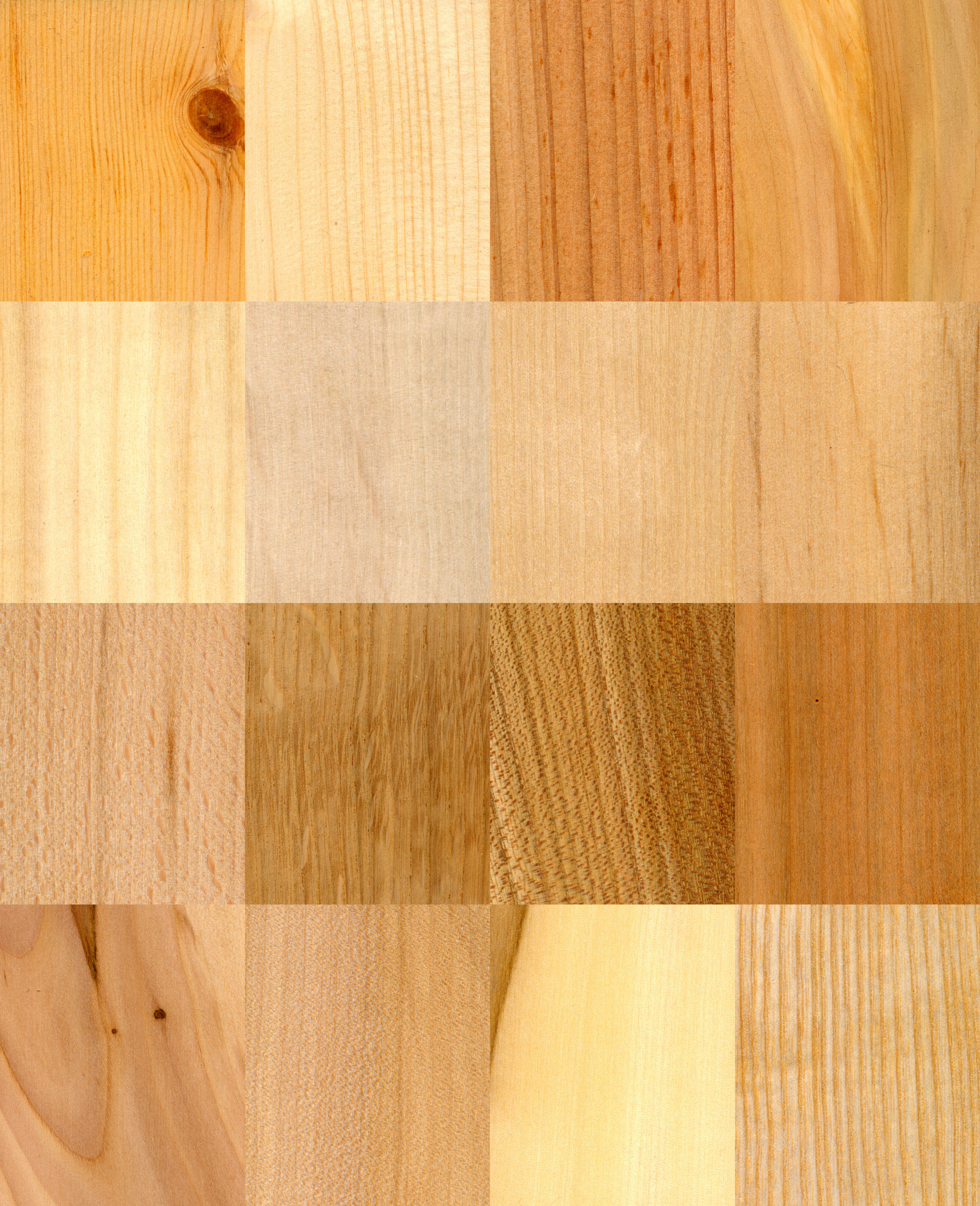

Wood is a natural, lignocellulosic material derived primarily from the secondary xylem of trees and other woody plants, where it provides mechanical support and in the functional sapwood, conducts water and dissolved minerals. Being a natural material, it is characterized as an organic material – a natural composite of cellulosic fibers that are strong in tension and embedded in a matrix of lignin and hemicelluloses that resists compression.

Wood is sometimes defined as only the secondary xylem in the stems of trees, or more broadly to include the same type of tissue elsewhere, such as in the roots of trees or shrubs. In a living tree, it performs a mechanical-support function, enabling woody plants to grow large or to stand up by themselves. It also conveys water and nutrients among the leaves, other growing tissues, and the roots. Wood may also refer to other plant materials with comparable properties, and to material engineered from wood, woodchips, or fibers.

Wood has been used by humans since prehistoric times for fuel, tools, weapons, and shelter, and later as a construction material and for making furniture, paper, and other products. Its use predates recorded history, with early humans exploiting branches, poles, and logs for simple tools, hunting weapons, shelters, and firewood. More recently, wood has also emerged as a feedstock for the production of purified cellulose and its derivatives, including, among many others, cellophane and cellulose acetate.

In English language, several terms are synonyms with wood, including timber, lumber, planking, boards, planks, logs, firewood, kindling, fuelwood. The terms xylon, xylem, derived from the Ancient Greek word ξύλον, refers to wood but is uncommon in modern English. These terms denote specific forms, uses, or products of wood.

As of 2025, the growing stock of forests worldwide was about 630 billion cubic metres. As an abundant, carbon-neutral renewable resource, woody materials have been of intense interest as a source of renewable energy. In 2023, almost 4 billion cubic meters of wood were harvested. Dominant uses were for furniture and building construction.

Wood is scientifically studied through the discipline of wood science, which emerged as a distinct field of study in the early 20th century.

== History ==
A 2011 discovery in the Canadian province of New Brunswick yielded the earliest known plants to have grown wood, approximately 395 to 400 million years ago. Wood can be dated by carbon dating and in some species by dendrochronology to determine when a wooden object was created.

People have used wood for thousands of years for many purposes, including as a fuel or as a construction material for making houses, tools, weapons, furniture, packaging, artworks, and paper. Known constructions using wood date back ten thousand years. Buildings like the longhouses in Neolithic Europe were made primarily of wood.

Recent use of wood has been enhanced by the addition of steel and bronze into construction. The year-to-year variation in tree-ring widths and isotopic abundances gives clues to the prevailing climate at the time a tree was cut.

Early humans progressively invented tools and techniques for trapping animals. The earliest spears were crafted from wood, with tips toughened by burning. By 15,000 BC, hunters employed wooden and bone spear-launchers to enhance force and distance. These devices were frequently adorned with carvings of creatures.

== Physical properties ==
Diagram of secondary growth in a tree showing idealized vertical and horizontal sections. A new layer of wood is added in each growing season, thickening the stem, existing branches and roots, to form a growth ring.

=== Growth rings ===
Wood, in the strict sense, is yielded by trees, which increases in diameter by the formation, between the existing wood and the inner bark, of new woody layers which envelop the entire stem, living branches, and roots. This process is known as secondary growth; it is the result of cell division in the vascular cambium, a lateral meristem, and subsequent expansion of the new cells. These cells then go on to form thickened secondary cell walls, composed mainly of cellulose, hemicellulose and lignin.

Where the differences between the seasons are distinct, e.g. New Zealand, growth can occur in a discrete annual or seasonal pattern, leading to growth rings; these can usually be most clearly seen on the end of a log, but are also visible on the other surfaces. If the distinctiveness between seasons is annual (as is the case in equatorial regions, e.g. Singapore), these growth rings are referred to as annual rings. Where there is little seasonal difference growth rings are likely to be indistinct or absent. If the bark of the tree has been removed in a particular area, the rings will likely be deformed as the plant overgrows the scar.

A vector graphic image labeling the rings of a tree. Includes alburnum, medulla, duramen, bast, and rhytidome.

If there are differences within a growth ring, then the part of a growth ring nearest the center of the tree, and formed early in the growing season when growth is rapid, is usually composed of wider elements. It is usually lighter in color than that near the outer portion of the ring, and is known as earlywood or springwood. The outer portion formed later in the season is then known as the latewood or summerwood. There are major differences, depending on the kind of wood. If a tree grows all its life in the open and the conditions of soil and site remain unchanged, it will make its most rapid growth in youth, and gradually decline. The annual rings of growth are for many years quite wide, but later they become narrower and narrower. Since each succeeding ring is laid down on the outside of the wood previously formed, it follows that unless a tree materially increases its production of wood from year to year, the rings must necessarily become thinner as the trunk gets wider. As a tree reaches maturity its crown becomes more open and the annual wood production is lessened, thereby reducing still more the width of the growth rings. In the case of forest-grown trees so much depends upon the competition of the trees in their struggle for light and nourishment that periods of rapid and slow growth may alternate. Some trees, such as southern oaks, maintain the same width of ring for hundreds of years. On the whole, as a tree gets larger in diameter the width of the growth rings decreases.

=== Knots ===
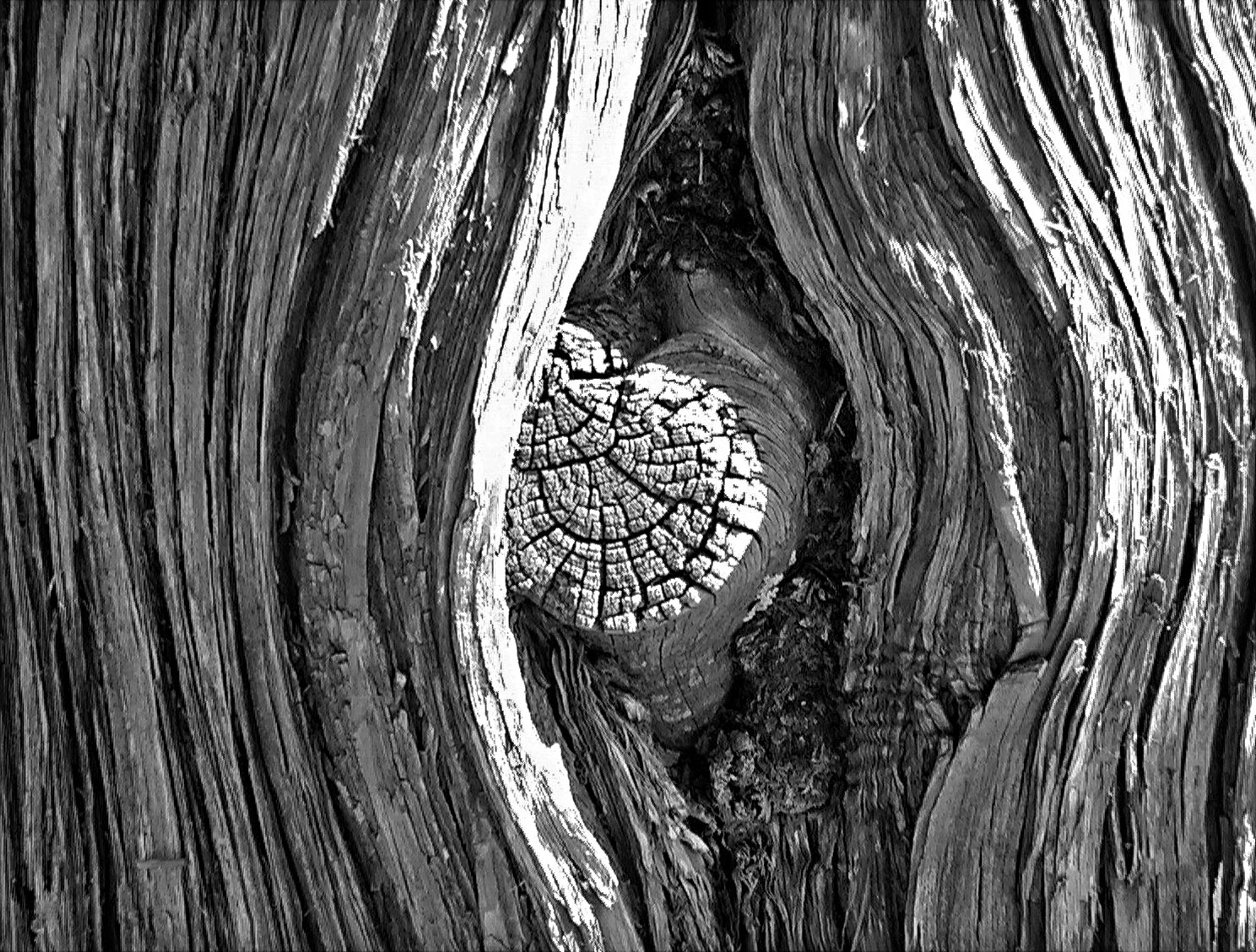
A knot on a tree trunk

As a tree grows, lower branches often die, and their bases may become overgrown and enclosed by subsequent layers of trunk wood, forming a type of imperfection known as a knot. The dead branch may not be attached to the trunk wood except at its base and can drop out after the tree has been sawn into boards. Knots affect the technical properties of the wood, usually reducing tension strength, but may be exploited for visual effect. In a longitudinally sawn plank, a knot will appear as a roughly circular "solid" (usually darker) piece of wood around which the grain of the rest of the wood "flows" (parts and rejoins). Within a knot, the direction of the wood (grain direction) is up to 90 degrees different from the grain direction of the regular wood.

In the tree a knot is either the base of a side branch or a dormant bud. A knot (when the base of a side branch) is conical in shape (hence the roughly circular cross-section) with the inner tip at the point in stem diameter at which the plant's vascular cambium was located when the branch formed as a bud.

In lumber and structural timber grading, knots are classified according to their form, size, and soundness, and the firmness with which they are held in place. This firmness is affected by, among other factors, the length of time for which the branch was dead while the attaching stem continued to grow.

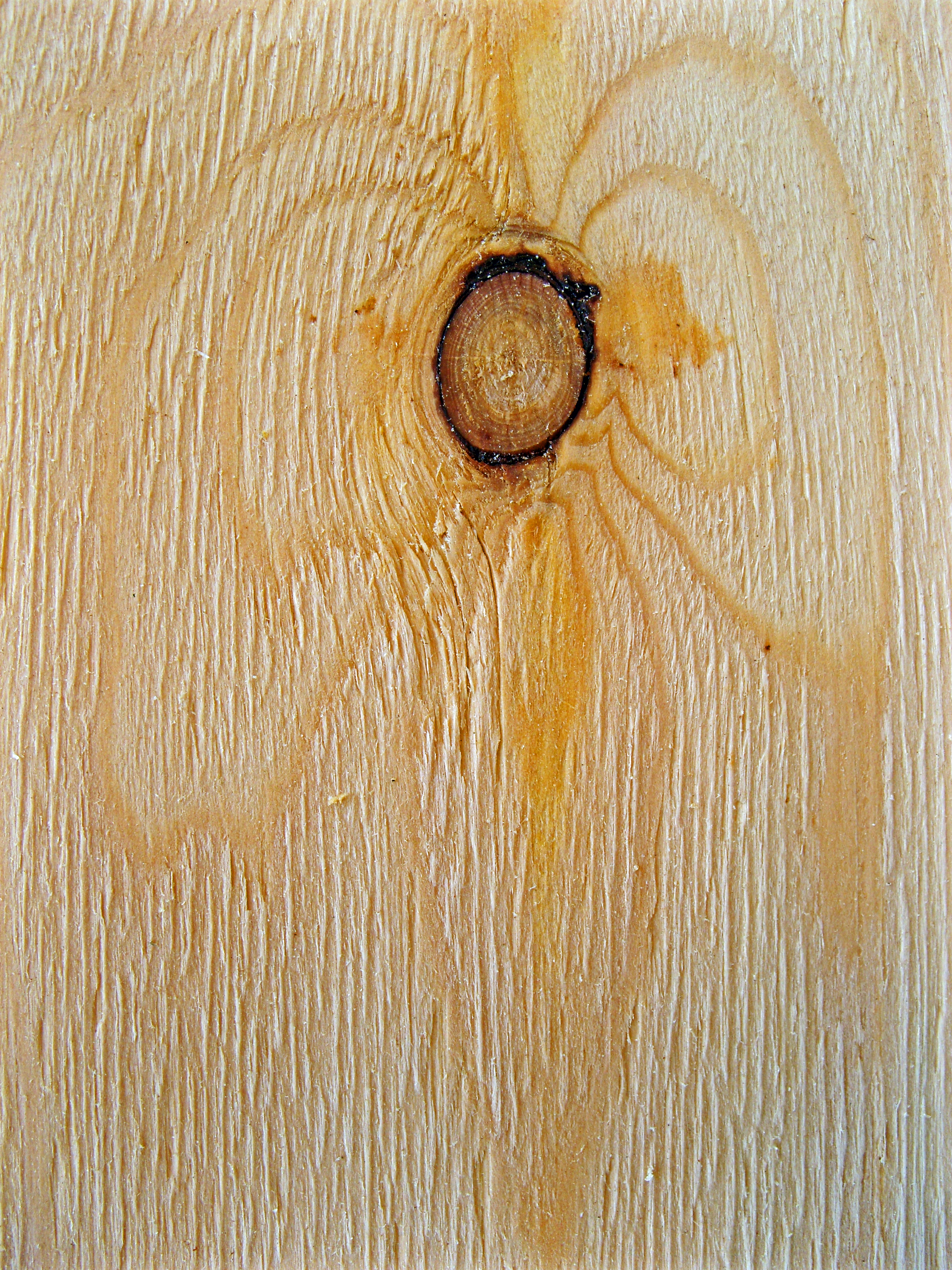
Wood knot in vertical section

Knots materially affect cracking and warping, ease in working, and cleavability of timber. They are defects which weaken timber and lower its value for structural purposes where strength is an important consideration. The weakening effect is much more serious when timber is subjected to forces perpendicular to the grain and/or tension than when under load along the grain and/or compression. The extent to which knots affect the strength of a beam depends upon their position, size, number, and condition. A knot on the upper side is compressed, while one on the lower side is subjected to tension. If there is a season check in the knot, as is often the case, it will offer little resistance to this tensile stress. Small knots may be located along the neutral plane of a beam and increase the strength by preventing longitudinal shearing. Knots in a board or plank are least injurious when they extend through it at right angles to its broadest surface. Knots which occur near the ends of a beam do not weaken it. Sound knots which occur in the central portion one-fourth the height of the beam from either edge are not serious defects.

— Samuel J. Record, The Mechanical Properties of Wood

Knots do not necessarily influence the stiffness of structural timber; this will depend on the size and location. Stiffness and elastic strength are more dependent upon the sound wood than upon localized defects. The breaking strength is very susceptible to defects. Sound knots do not weaken wood when subject to compression parallel to the grain.

In some decorative applications, wood with knots may be desirable to add visual interest. In applications where wood is painted, such as skirting boards, fascia boards, door frames and furniture, resins present in the timber may continue to 'bleed' through to the surface of a knot for months or even years after manufacture and show as a yellow or brownish stain. A knot primer paint or solution (knotting), correctly applied during preparation, may do much to reduce this problem, but it is difficult to control completely, especially in mass-produced kiln-dried timber stocks.

=== Heartwood and sapwood ===
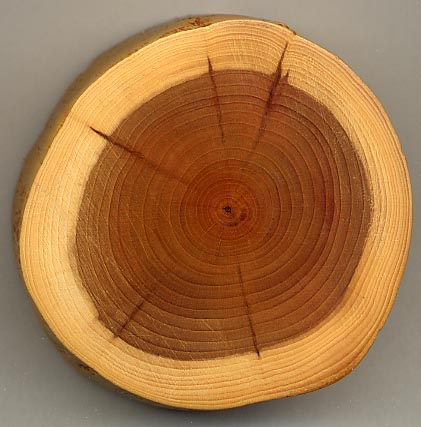
A section of a yew branch showing 27 annual growth rings, pale sapwood, dark heartwood, and pith (center dark spot). The dark radial lines are small knots.

Heartwood (or duramen) is wood that as a result of a naturally occurring chemical transformation has become more resistant to decay. Heartwood formation is a genetically programmed process that occurs spontaneously. Some uncertainty exists as to whether the wood dies during heartwood formation, as it can still chemically react to decay organisms, but only once.

The term heartwood derives solely from its position and not from any vital importance to the tree. This is evidenced by the fact that a tree can thrive with its heart completely decayed. Some species begin to form heartwood very early in life, so having only a thin layer of live sapwood, while in others the change comes slowly. Thin sapwood is characteristic of such species as chestnut, black locust, mulberry, osage-orange, and sassafras, while in maple, ash, hickory, hackberry, beech, and pine, thick sapwood is the rule. Some others never form heartwood.

Heartwood is often visually distinct from the living sapwood and can be distinguished in a cross-section where the boundary will tend to follow the growth rings. For example, it is sometimes much darker. Other processes such as decay or insect invasion can also discolor wood, even in woody plants that do not form heartwood, which may lead to confusion.

Sapwood (or alburnum) is the younger, outermost wood; in the growing tree it is living wood, and its principal functions are to conduct water from the roots to the leaves and to store up and give back according to the season the reserves prepared in the leaves. By the time they become competent to conduct water, all xylem tracheids and vessels have lost their cytoplasm and the cells are therefore functionally dead. All wood in a tree is first formed as sapwood. The more leaves a tree bears and the more vigorous its growth, the larger the volume of sapwood required. Hence trees making rapid growth in the open have thicker sapwood for their size than trees of the same species growing in dense forests. Sometimes trees (of species that do form heartwood) grown in the open may become of considerable size, 30 cm (12 in) or more in diameter, before any heartwood begins to form, for example, in second growth hickory, or open-grown pines.

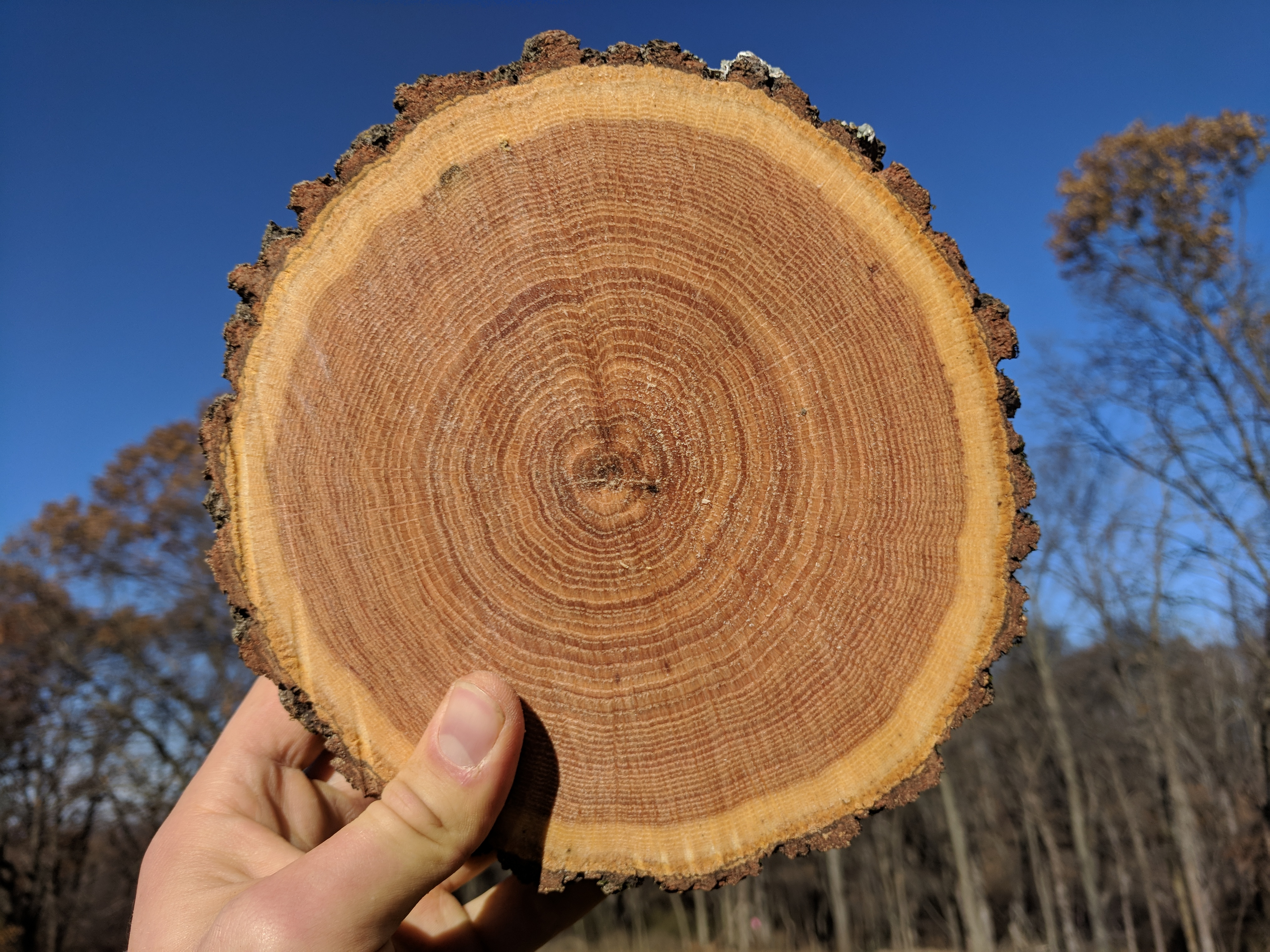
Cross-section of an oak log showing growth rings

No definite relation exists between the annual rings of growth and the amount of sapwood. Within the same species the cross-sectional area of the sapwood is very roughly proportional to the size of the crown of the tree. If the rings are narrow, more of them are required than where they are wide. As the tree gets larger, the sapwood must necessarily become thinner or increase materially in volume. Sapwood is relatively thicker in the upper portion of the trunk of a tree than near the base, because the age and the diameter of the upper sections are less.

When a tree is very young it is covered with limbs almost, if not entirely, to the ground, but as it grows older some or all of them will eventually die and are either broken off or fall off. Subsequent growth of wood may completely conceal the stubs which will remain as knots. No matter how smooth and clear a log is on the outside, it is more or less knotty near the middle. Consequently, the sapwood of an old tree, and particularly of a forest-grown tree, will be freer from knots than the inner heartwood. Since in most uses of wood, knots are defects that weaken the timber and interfere with its ease of working and other properties, it follows that a given piece of sapwood, because of its position in the tree, may well be stronger than a piece of heartwood from the same tree.

Different pieces of wood cut from a large tree may differ decidedly, particularly if the tree is big and mature. In some trees, the wood laid on late in the life of a tree is softer, lighter, weaker, and more even textured than that produced earlier, but in other trees, the reverse applies. This may or may not correspond to heartwood and sapwood. In a large log the sapwood, because of the time in the life of the tree when it was grown, may be inferior in hardness, strength, and toughness to equally sound heartwood from the same log. In a smaller tree, the reverse may be true.

=== Color ===
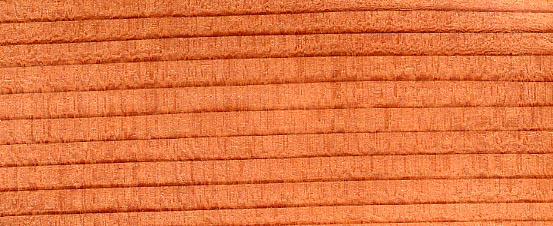
The wood of coast redwood is distinctively red.

In species which show a distinct difference between heartwood and sapwood the natural color of heartwood is usually darker than that of the sapwood, and very frequently the contrast is conspicuous (see section of yew log above). This is produced by deposits in the heartwood of chemical substances, so that a dramatic color variation does not imply a significant difference in the mechanical properties of heartwood and sapwood, although there may be a marked biochemical difference between the two.

Some experiments on very resinous longleaf pine specimens indicate an increase in strength, due to the resin which increases the strength when dry. Such resin-saturated heartwood is called "fat lighter". Structures built of fat lighter are almost impervious to rot and termites, and very flammable. Tree stumps of old longleaf pines are often dug, split into small pieces and sold as kindling for fires. Stumps thus dug may actually remain a century or more since being cut. Spruce impregnated with crude resin and dried is also greatly increased in strength thereby.

Since the latewood of a growth ring is usually darker in color than the earlywood, this fact may be used in visually judging the density, and therefore the hardness and strength of the material. This is particularly the case with coniferous woods. In ring-porous woods the vessels of the early wood often appear on a finished surface as darker than the denser latewood, though on cross sections of heartwood the reverse is commonly true. Otherwise the color of wood is no indication of strength.

Abnormal discoloration of wood often denotes a diseased condition, indicating unsoundness. The black check in western hemlock is the result of insect attacks. The reddish-brown streaks so common in hickory and certain other woods are mostly the result of injury by birds. The discoloration is merely an indication of an injury, and in all probability does not of itself affect the properties of the wood. Certain rot-producing fungi impart to wood characteristic colors which thus become symptomatic of weakness. Ordinary sap-staining is due to fungal growth, but does not necessarily produce a weakening effect.

=== Water content ===
Water occurs in living wood in three locations, namely:

- in the cell walls
- in the protoplasmic contents of the cells
- as free water in the cell cavities and spaces, especially of the xylem

Equilibrium moisture content in wood.

In heartwood it occurs only in the first and last forms. Wood that is thoroughly air-dried (in equilibrium with the moisture content of the air) retains 8–16% of the water in the cell walls, and none, or practically none, in the other forms. Even oven-dried wood retains a small percentage of moisture, but for all except chemical purposes, may be considered absolutely dry.

The general effect of the water content upon the wood substance is to render it softer and more pliable. A similar effect occurs in the softening action of water on rawhide, paper, or cloth. Within certain limits, the greater the water content, the greater its softening effect. The moisture in wood can be measured by several different moisture meters.

Drying produces a decided increase in the strength of wood, particularly in small specimens. An extreme example is the case of a completely dry spruce block 5 cm in section, which will sustain a permanent load four times as great as a green (undried) block of the same size will.

The greatest strength increase due to drying is in the ultimate crushing strength, and strength at elastic limit in endwise compression; these are followed by the modulus of rupture, and stress at elastic limit in cross-bending, while the modulus of elasticity is least affected.

=== Structure ===
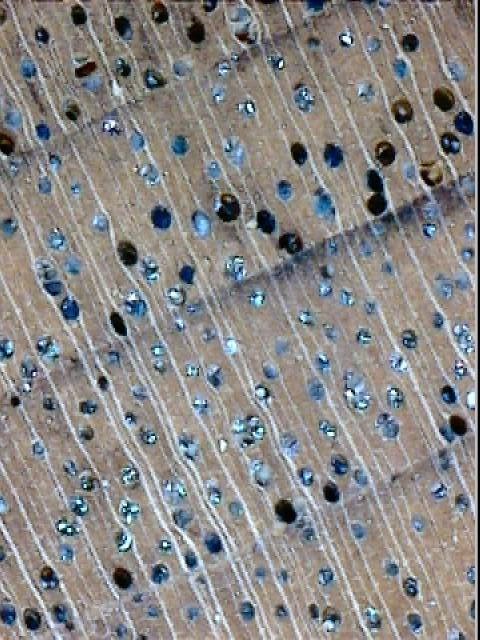
Magnified cross-section of black walnut, showing the vessels, medullary rays (white lines) and annual rings: this is intermediate between diffuse-porous and ring-porous, with vessel size declining gradually

Wood is a heterogeneous, hygroscopic, cellular and anisotropic (or more specifically, orthotropic) material. It consists of cells, and the cell walls are composed of micro-fibrils of cellulose (40–50%) and hemicellulose (15–25%) impregnated with lignin (15–30%).

In coniferous or softwood species the wood cells are mostly of one kind, tracheids, and as a result the material is much more uniform in structure than that of most hardwoods. There are no vessels ("pores") in coniferous wood such as one sees so prominently in oak and ash, for example.

The structure of hardwoods is more complex. The water conducting capability is mostly taken care of by vessels: in some cases (oak, chestnut, ash) these are quite large and distinct, in others (buckeye, poplar, willow) too small to be seen without a hand lens. In discussing such woods it is customary to divide them into two large classes, ring-porous and diffuse-porous.

In ring-porous species, such as ash, black locust, catalpa, chestnut, elm, hickory, mulberry, and oak, the larger vessels or pores (as cross sections of vessels are called) are localized in the part of the growth ring formed in spring, thus forming a region of more or less open and porous tissue. The rest of the ring, produced in summer, is made up of smaller vessels and a much greater proportion of wood fibers. These fibers are the elements which give strength and toughness to wood, while the vessels are a source of weakness.

In diffuse-porous woods the pores are evenly sized so that the water conducting capability is scattered throughout the growth ring instead of being collected in a band or row. Examples of this kind of wood are alder, basswood, birch, buckeye, maple, willow, and the Populus species such as aspen, cottonwood and poplar. Some species, such as walnut and cherry, are on the border between the two classes, forming an intermediate group.

=== Earlywood and latewood ===
==== In softwood ====
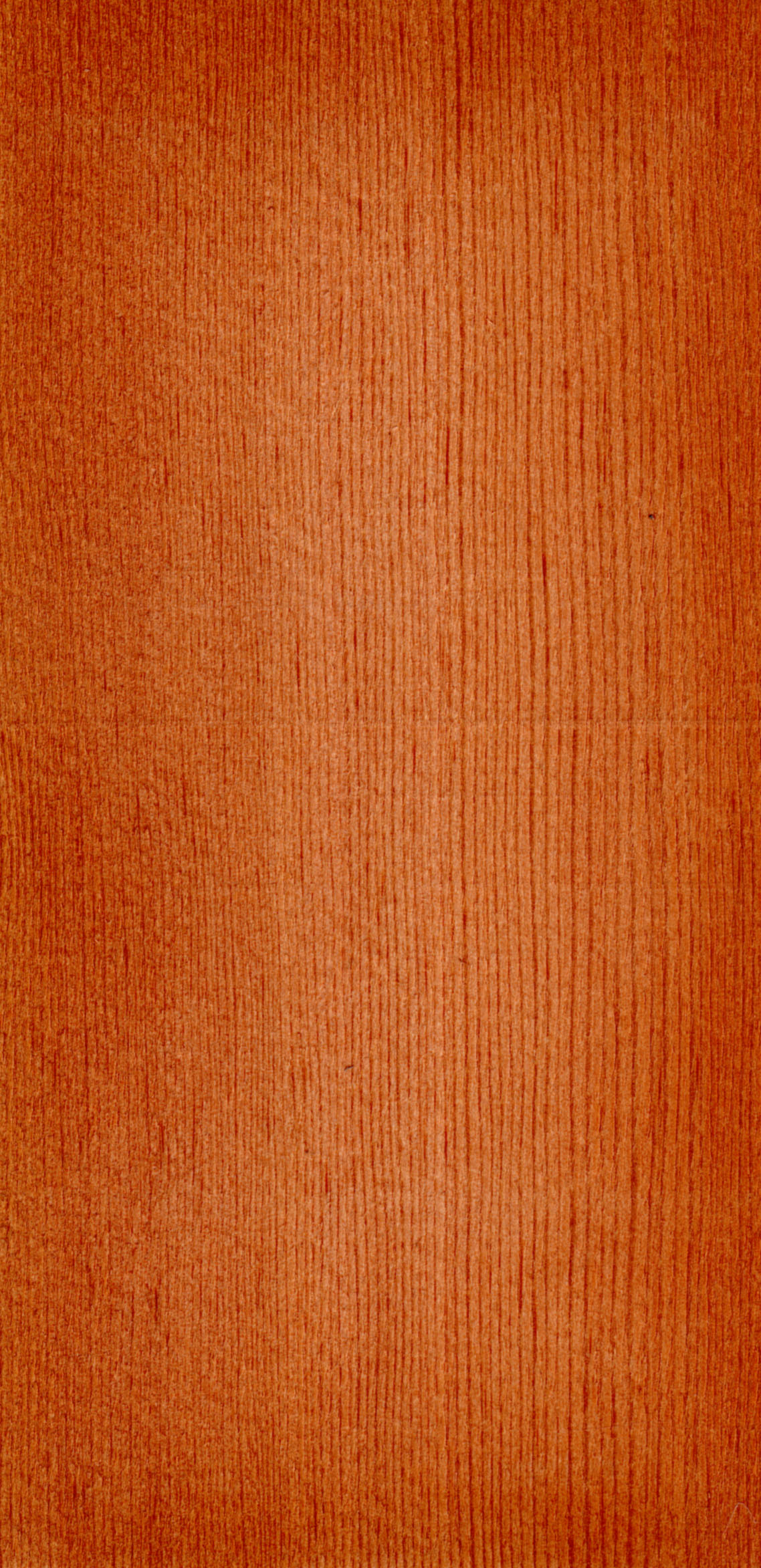
Earlywood and latewood in a softwood; radial view, growth rings closely spaced in Rocky Mountain Douglas-fir

In temperate softwoods, there often is a marked difference between latewood and earlywood. The latewood will be denser than that formed early in the season. When examined under a microscope, the cells of dense latewood are seen to be very thick-walled and with very small cell cavities, while those formed first in the season have thin walls and large cell cavities. The strength is in the walls, not the cavities. Hence the greater the proportion of latewood, the greater the density and strength. In choosing a piece of pine where strength or stiffness is the important consideration, the principal thing to observe is the comparative amounts of earlywood and latewood. The width of ring is not nearly so important as the proportion and nature of the latewood in the ring.

If a heavy piece of pine is compared with a lightweight piece it will be seen at once that the heavier one contains a larger proportion of latewood than the other, and is therefore showing more clearly demarcated growth rings. In white pines there is not much contrast between the different parts of the ring, and as a result the wood is very uniform in texture and is easy to work. In hard pines, on the other hand, the latewood is very dense and is deep-colored, presenting a very decided contrast to the soft, straw-colored earlywood.

It is not only the proportion of latewood, but also its quality, that counts. In specimens that show a very large proportion of latewood it may be noticeably more porous and weigh considerably less than the latewood in pieces that contain less latewood. One can judge comparative density, and therefore to some extent strength, by visual inspection.

No satisfactory explanation can as yet be given for the exact mechanisms determining the formation of earlywood and latewood. Several factors may be involved. In conifers, at least, rate of growth alone does not determine the proportion of the two portions of the ring, for in some cases the wood of slow growth is very hard and heavy, while in others the opposite is true. The quality of the site where the tree grows undoubtedly affects the character of the wood formed, though it is not possible to formulate a rule governing it. In general, where strength or ease of working is essential, woods of moderate to slow growth should be chosen.

==== In ring-porous woods ====
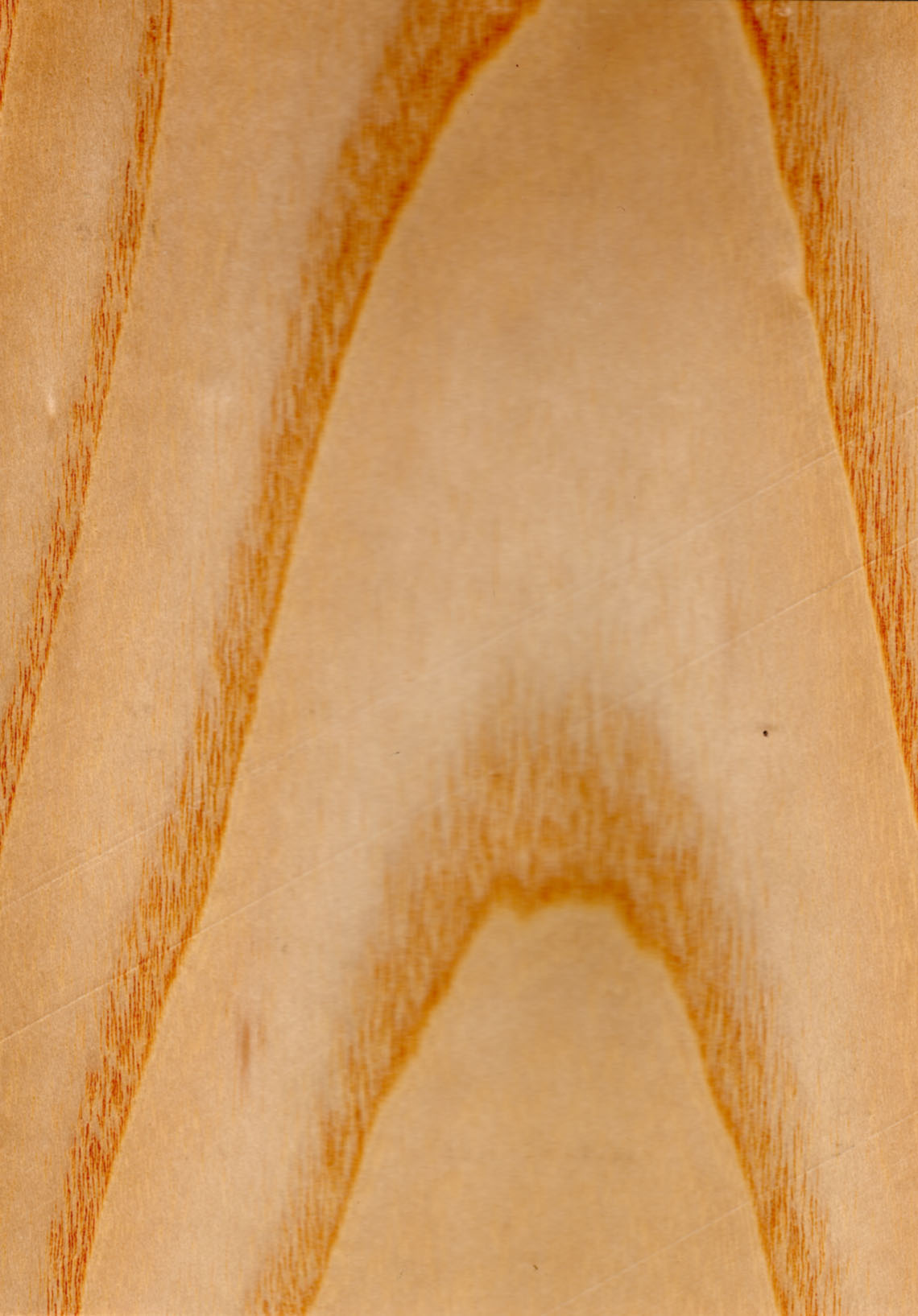
Earlywood and latewood in a ring-porous wood (ash) in a Fraxinus excelsior; tangential view, wide growth rings

In ring-porous woods, each season's growth is always well defined, because the large pores formed early in the season abut on the denser tissue of the year before.

In the case of the ring-porous hardwoods, there seems to exist a pretty definite relation between the rate of growth of timber and its properties. This may be briefly summed up in the general statement that the more rapid the growth or the wider the rings of growth, the heavier, harder, stronger, and stiffer the wood. This, it must be remembered, applies only to ring-porous woods such as oak, ash, hickory, and others of the same group, and is, of course, subject to some exceptions and limitations.

In ring-porous woods of good growth, it is usually the latewood in which the thick-walled, strength-giving fibers are most abundant. As the breadth of ring diminishes, this latewood is reduced so that very slow growth produces comparatively light, porous wood composed of thin-walled vessels and wood parenchyma. In good oak, these large vessels of the earlywood occupy from six to ten percent of the volume of the log, while in inferior material they may make up 25% or more. The latewood of good oak is dark colored and firm, and consists mostly of thick-walled fibers which form one-half or more of the wood. In inferior oak, this latewood is much reduced both in quantity and quality. Such variation is very largely the result of rate of growth.

Wide-ringed wood is often called "second-growth", because the growth of the young timber in open stands after the old trees have been removed is more rapid than in trees in a closed forest, and in the manufacture of articles where strength is an important consideration such "second-growth" hardwood material is preferred. This is particularly the case in the choice of hickory for handles and spokes. Here not only strength, but toughness and resilience are important.

The results of a series of tests on hickory by the U.S. Forest Service show:

The work or shock-resisting ability is greatest in wide-ringed wood that has from 5 to 14 rings per inch (rings 1.8-5 mm thick), is fairly constant from 14 to 38 rings per inch (rings 0.7–1.8 mm thick), and decreases rapidly from 38 to 47 rings per inch (rings 0.5–0.7 mm thick). The strength at maximum load is not so great with the most rapid-growing wood; it is maximum with from 14 to 20 rings per inch (rings 1.3–1.8 mm thick), and again becomes less as the wood becomes more closely ringed. The natural deduction is that wood of first-class mechanical value shows from 5 to 20 rings per inch (rings 1.3–5 mm thick) and that slower growth yields poorer stock. Thus the inspector or buyer of hickory should discriminate against timber that has more than 20 rings per inch (rings less than 1.3 mm thick). Exceptions exist, however, in the case of normal growth upon dry situations, in which the slow-growing material may be strong and tough.

The effect of rate of growth on the qualities of chestnut wood is summarized by the same authority as follows:

When the rings are wide, the transition from spring wood to summer wood is gradual, while in the narrow rings the spring wood passes into summer wood abruptly. The width of the spring wood changes but little with the width of the annual ring, so that the narrowing or broadening of the annual ring is always at the expense of the summer wood. The narrow vessels of the summer wood make it richer in wood substance than the spring wood composed of wide vessels. Therefore, rapid-growing specimens with wide rings have more wood substance than slow-growing trees with narrow rings. Since the more the wood substance the greater the weight, and the greater the weight the stronger the wood, chestnuts with wide rings must have stronger wood than chestnuts with narrow rings. This agrees with the accepted view that sprouts (which always have wide rings) yield better and stronger wood than seedling chestnuts, which grow more slowly in diameter.

==== In diffuse-porous woods ====
In the diffuse-porous woods, the demarcation between rings is not always so clear and in some cases is almost (if not entirely) invisible to the unaided eye. Conversely, when there is a clear demarcation there may not be a noticeable difference in structure within the growth ring.

In diffuse-porous woods, as has been stated, the vessels or pores are even-sized, so that the water conducting capability is scattered throughout the ring instead of collected in the earlywood. The effect of rate of growth is, therefore, not the same as in the ring-porous woods, approaching more nearly the conditions in the conifers. In general, it may be stated that such woods of medium growth afford stronger material than when very rapidly or very slowly grown. In many uses of wood, total strength is not the main consideration. If ease of working is prized, wood should be chosen with regard to its uniformity of texture and straightness of grain, which will in most cases occur when there is little contrast between the latewood of one season's growth and the earlywood of the next.

=== Monocots ===
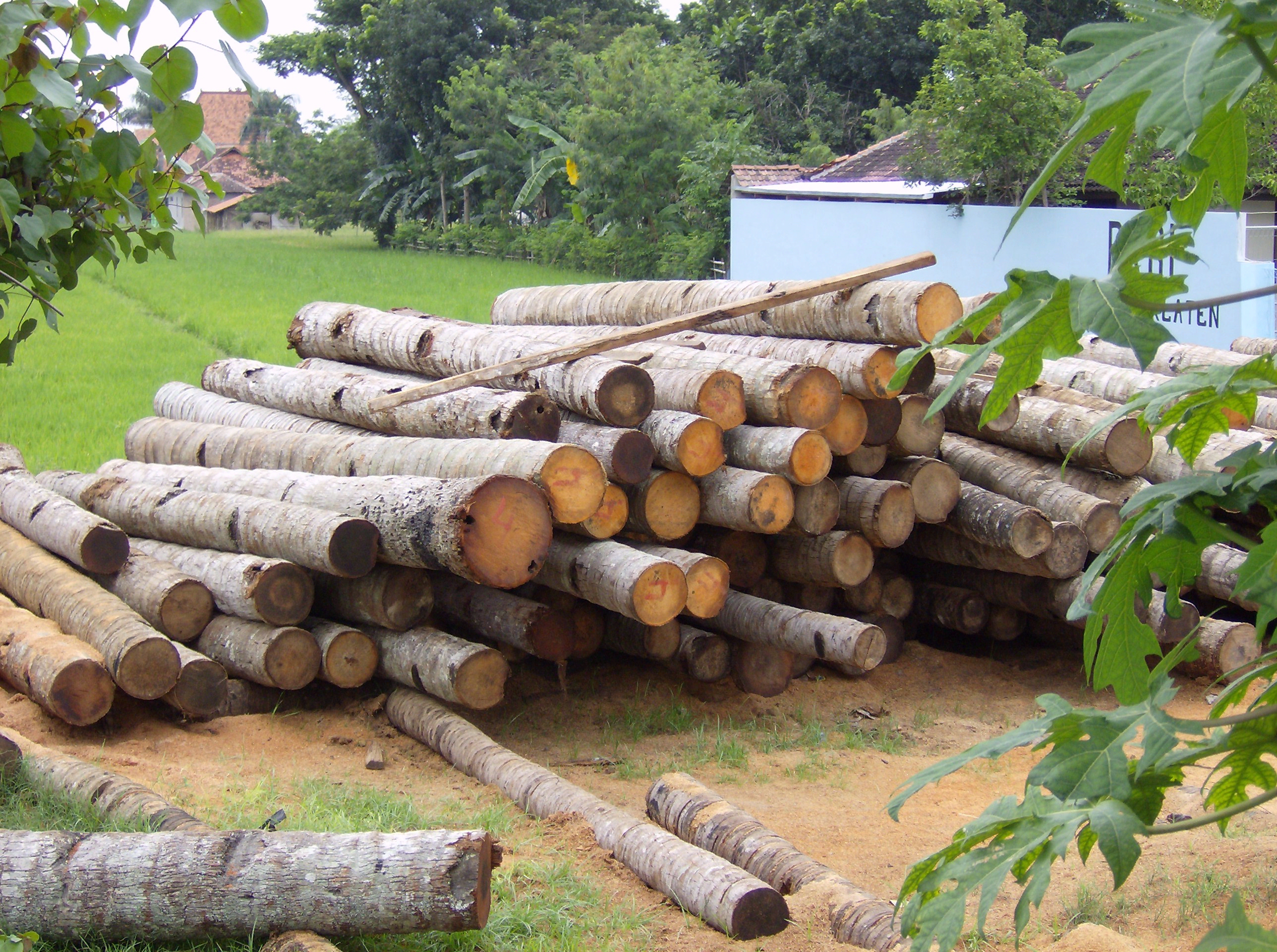
Trunks of the coconut palm, a monocot, in Java. From this perspective these look not much different from trunks of a dicot or conifer

Structural material that resembles ordinary, "dicot" or conifer timber in its gross handling characteristics is produced by a number of monocot plants, and these also are colloquially called wood. Of these, bamboo, botanically a member of the grass family, has considerable economic importance, larger culms being widely used as a building and construction material and in the manufacture of engineered flooring, panels and veneer. Another major plant group that produces material that often is called wood are the palms. Of much less importance are plants such as Pandanus, Dracaena and Cordyline. With all this material, the structure and composition of the processed raw material is quite different from ordinary wood.

=== Specific gravity ===
The single most revealing property of wood as an indicator of wood quality is specific gravity (Timell 1986), as both pulp yield and lumber strength are determined by it. Specific gravity is the ratio of the mass of a substance to the mass of an equal volume of water; density is the ratio of the mass of a quantity of a substance to the volume of that quantity and is expressed in mass per unit substance, e.g., grams per milliliter (g/cm^{3} or g/ml). The terms are essentially equivalent as long as the metric system is used. Upon drying, wood shrinks and its density increases. Minimum values are associated with green (water-saturated) wood and are referred to as basic specific gravity (Timell 1986).

The U.S. Forest Products Laboratory lists a variety of ways to define specific gravity (G) and density (ρ) for wood:

Symbol	Mass basis	Volume basis
G_{0}	Ovendry	Ovendry
G_{b} (basic)	Ovendry	Green
G_{12}	Ovendry	12% MC
G_{x}	Ovendry	x% MC
ρ_{0}	Ovendry	Ovendry
ρ_{12}	12% MC	12% MC
ρ_{x}	x% MC	x% MC

The FPL has adopted G_{b} and G_{12} for specific gravity, in accordance with the ASTM D2555 standard. These are scientifically useful, but don't represent any condition that could physically occur. The FPL Wood Handbook also provides formulas for approximately converting any of these measurements to any other.

=== Density ===
Wood density is determined by multiple growth and physiological factors compounded into "one fairly easily measured wood characteristic" (Elliott 1970).

Age, diameter, height, radial (trunk) growth, geographical location, site and growing conditions, silvicultural treatment, and seed source all to some degree influence wood density. Variation is to be expected. The USDA Forest Service measured a coefficient of variation for the specific gravity of wood as 10%. In other words, about 68% (a standard deviation) of samples will fall within ±10% of the average specific gravity for a given species. Within an individual tree, the variation in wood density is often as great as or even greater than that between different trees (Timell 1986). Variation of specific gravity within the bole of a tree can occur in either the horizontal or vertical direction.

Because the specific gravity as defined above uses an unrealistic condition, woodworkers tend to use the "average dried weight", which is a density based on mass at 12% moisture content and volume at the same (ρ_{12}). This condition occurs when the wood is at equilibrium moisture content with air at about 65% relative humidity and temperature at 30 °C (86 °F). This density is expressed in units of kg/m^{3} or lbs/ft^{3}. If you know the specific gravity at 12% MC, G_{12} (from the Wood Handbook), then multiply by 1120 to get the average dried weight at 12% MC, ρ_{12}, in kg/m^{3}. For example, if G_{12} is 0.40, then average dried weight is ρ_{12} = 0.40 * 1120 = 448 kg/m^{3}. You can also find values for dried weight in two other FPL publications, Hardwoods of North America and Softwoods of North America.

=== Tables ===
The following tables list the mechanical properties of wood and lumber plant species, including bamboo. See also Mechanical properties of tonewoods for additional properties.

Wood properties:

Common name	Scientific name	Moisture content	Density (kg/m^{3})	Compressive strength (megapascals)	Flexural strength (megapascals)
Red Alder	Alnus rubra	Green	370	20.4	45
Red Alder	Alnus rubra	12.00%	410	40.1	68
Black Ash	Fraxinus nigra	Green	450	15.9	41
Black Ash	Fraxinus nigra	12.00%	490	41.2	87
Blue Ash	Fraxinus quadrangulata	Green	530	24.8	66
Blue Ash	Fraxinus quadrangulata	12.00%	580	48.1	95
Green Ash	Fraxinus pennsylvanica	Green	530	29	66
Green Ash	Fraxinus pennsylvanica	12.00%	560	48.8	97
Oregon Ash	Fraxinus latifolia	Green	500	24.2	52
Oregon Ash	Fraxinus latifolia	12.00%	550	41.6	88
White Ash	Fraxinus americana	Green	550	27.5	66
White Ash	Fraxinus americana	12.00%	600	51.1	103
Bigtooth Aspen	Populus grandidentata	Green	360	17.2	37
Bigtooth Aspen	Populus grandidentata	12.00%	390	36.5	63
Quaking Aspen	Populus tremuloides	Green	350	14.8	35
Quaking Aspen	Populus tremuloides	12.00%	380	29.3	58
American Basswood	Tilia americana	Green	320	15.3	34
American Basswood	Tilia americana	12.00%	370	32.6	60
American Beech	Fagus grandifolia	Green	560	24.5	59
American Beech	Fagus grandifolia	12.00%	640	50.3	103
Paper Birch	Betula papyrifera	Green	480	16.3	44
Paper Birch	Betula papyrifera	12.00%	550	39.2	85
Sweet Birch	Betula lenta	Green	600	25.8	65
Sweet Birch	Betula lenta	12.00%	650	58.9	117
Yellow Birch	Betula alleghaniensis	Green	550	23.3	57
Yellow Birch	Betula alleghaniensis	12.00%	620	56.3	114
Butternut	Juglans cinerea	Green	360	16.7	37
Butternut	Juglans cinerea	12.00%	380	36.2	56
Black Cherry	Prunus serotina	Green	470	24.4	55
Black Cherry	Prunus serotina	12.00%	500	49	85
American Chestnut	Castanea dentata	Green	400	17	39
American Chestnut	Castanea dentata	12.00%	430	36.7	59
Balsam Poplar Cottonwood	Populus balsamifera	Green	310	11.7	27
Balsam Poplar Cottonwood	Populus balsamifera	12.00%	340	27.7	47
Black Cottonwood	Populus trichocarpa	Green	310	15.2	34
Black Cottonwood	Populus trichocarpa	12.00%	350	31	59
Eastern Cottonwood	Populus deltoides	Green	370	15.7	37
Eastern Cottonwood	Populus deltoides	12.00%	400	33.9	59
American elm	Ulmus americana	Green	460	20.1	50
American elm	Ulmus americana	12.00%	500	38.1	81
Rock Elm	Ulmus thomasii	Green	570	26.1	66
Rock Elm	Ulmus thomasii	12.00%	630	48.6	102
Slippery Elm	Ulmus rubra	Green	480	22.9	55
Slippery Elm	Ulmus rubra	12.00%	530	43.9	90
Hackberry	Celtis occidentalis	Green	490	18.3	45
Hackberry	Celtis occidentalis	12.00%	530	37.5	76
Bitternut Hickory	Carya cordiformis	Green	600	31.5	71
Bitternut Hickory	Carya cordiformis	12.00%	660	62.3	118
Nutmeg Hickory	Carya myristiciformis	Green	560	27.4	63
Nutmeg Hickory	Carya myristiciformis	12.00%	600	47.6	114
Pecan Hickory	Carya illinoinensis	Green	600	27.5	68
Pecan Hickory	Carya illinoinensis	12.00%	660	54.1	94
Water Hickory	Carya aquatica	Green	610	32.1	74
Water Hickory	Carya aquatica	12.00%	620	59.3	123
Mockernut Hickory	Carya tomentosa	Green	640	30.9	77
Mockernut Hickory	Carya tomentosa	12.00%	720	61.6	132
Pignut Hickory	Carya glabra	Green	660	33.2	81
Pignut Hickory	Carya glabra	12.00%	750	63.4	139
Shagbark Hickory	Carya ovata	Green	640	31.6	76
Shagbark Hickory	Carya ovata	12.00%	720	63.5	139
Shellbark Hickory	Carya laciniosa	Green	620	27	72
Shellbark Hickory	Carya laciniosa	12.00%	690	55.2	125
Honeylocust	Gleditsia triacanthos	Green	600	30.5	70
Honeylocust	Gleditsia triacanthos	12.00%	600	51.7	101
Black Locust	Robinia pseudoacacia	Green	660	46.9	95
Black Locust	Robinia pseudoacacia	12.00%	690	70.2	134
Cucumber Tree Magnolia	Magnolia acuminata	Green	440	21.6	51
Cucumber Tree Magnolia	Magnolia acuminata	12.00%	480	43.5	85
Southern magnolia	Magnolia grandiflora	Green	460	18.6	47
Southern magnolia	Magnolia grandiflora	12.00%	500	37.6	77
Bigleaf Maple	Acer macrophyllum	Green	440	22.3	51
Bigleaf Maple	Acer macrophyllum	12.00%	480	41	74
Black Maple	Acer nigrum	Green	520	22.5	54
Black Maple	Acer nigrum	12.00%	570	46.1	92
Red Maple	Acer rubrum	Green	490	22.6	53
Red Maple	Acer rubrum	12.00%	540	45.1	92
Silver Maple	Acer saccharinum	Green	440	17.2	40
Silver Maple	Acer saccharinum	12.00%	470	36	61
Sugar Maple	Acer saccharum	Green	560	27.7	65
Sugar Maple	Acer saccharum	12.00%	630	54	109
Black Red Oak	Quercus velutina	Green	560	23.9	57
Black Red Oak	Quercus velutina	12.00%	610	45	96
Cherrybark Red Oak	Quercus pagoda	Green	610	31.9	74
Cherrybark Red Oak	Quercus pagoda	12.00%	680	60.3	125
Laurel Red Oak	Quercus hemisphaerica	Green	560	21.9	54
Laurel Red Oak	Quercus hemisphaerica	12.00%	630	48.1	87
Northern Red Oak	Quercus rubra	Green	560	23.7	57
Northern Red Oak	Quercus rubra	12.00%	630	46.6	99
Pin Red Oak	Quercus palustris	Green	580	25.4	57
Pin Red Oak	Quercus palustris	12.00%	630	47	97
Scarlet Red Oak	Quercus coccinea	Green	600	28.2	72
Scarlet Red Oak	Quercus coccinea	12.00%	670	57.4	120
Southern Red Oak	Quercus falcata	Green	520	20.9	48
Southern Red Oak	Quercus falcata	12.00%	590	42	75
Water Red Oak	Quercus nigra	Green	560	25.8	61
Water Red Oak	Quercus nigra	12.00%	630	46.7	106
Willow Red Oak	Quercus phellos	Green	560	20.7	51
Willow Red Oak	Quercus phellos	12.00%	690	48.5	100
Bur White Oak	Quercus macrocarpa	Green	580	22.7	50
Bur White Oak	Quercus macrocarpa	12.00%	640	41.8	71
Chestnut White Oak	Quercus montana	Green	570	24.3	55
Chestnut White Oak	Quercus montana	12.00%	660	47.1	92
Live White Oak	Quercus virginiana	Green	800	37.4	82
Live White Oak	Quercus virginiana	12.00%	880	61.4	127
Overcup White Oak	Quercus lyrata	Green	570	23.2	55
Overcup White Oak	Quercus lyrata	12.00%	630	42.7	87
Post White Oak	Quercus stellata	Green	600	24	56
Post White Oak	Quercus stellata	12.00%	670	45.3	91
Swamp Chestnut White Oak	Quercus michauxii	Green	600	24.4	59
Swamp Chestnut White Oak	Quercus michauxii	12.00%	670	50.1	96
Swamp White Oak	Quercus bicolor	Green	640	30.1	68
Swamp White Oak	Quercus bicolor	12.00%	720	59.3	122
White Oak	Quercus alba	Green	600	24.5	57
White Oak	Quercus alba	12.00%	680	51.3	105
Sassafras	Sassafras albidum	Green	420	18.8	41
Sassafras	Sassafras albidum	12.00%	460	32.8	62
Sweetgum	Liquidambar styraciflua	Green	460	21	49
Sweetgum	Liquidambar styraciflua	12.00%	520	43.6	86
American Sycamore	Platanus occidentalis	Green	460	20.1	45
American Sycamore	Platanus occidentalis	12.00%	490	37.1	69
Tanoak	Notholithocarpus densiflorus	Green	580	32.1	72
Tanoak	Notholithocarpus densiflorus	12.00%	580	32.1	72
Black Tupelo	Nyssa sylvatica	Green	460	21	48
Black Tupelo	Nyssa sylvatica	12.00%	500	38.1	66
Water Tupelo	Nyssa aquatica	Green	460	23.2	50
Water Tupelo	Nyssa aquatica	12.00%	500	40.8	66
Black Walnut	Juglans nigra	Green	510	29.6	66
Black Walnut	Juglans nigra	12.00%	550	52.3	101
Black Willow	Salix nigra	Green	360	14.1	33
Black Willow	Salix nigra	12.00%	390	28.3	54
Yellow Poplar	Liriodendron tulipifera	Green	400	18.3	41
Yellow Poplar	Liriodendron tulipifera	12.00%	420	38.2	70
Baldcypress	Taxodium distichum	Green	420	24.7	46
Baldcypress	Taxodium distichum	12.00%	460	43.9	73
Atlantic White Cedar	Chamaecyparis thyoides	Green	310	16.5	32
Atlantic White Cedar	Chamaecyparis thyoides	12.00%	320	32.4	47
Eastern Redcedar	Juniperus virginiana	Green	440	24.6	48
Eastern Redcedar	Juniperus virginiana	12.00%	470	41.5	61
Incense Cedar	Calocedrus decurrens	Green	350	21.7	43
Incense Cedar	Calocedrus decurrens	12.00%	370	35.9	55
Northern White Cedar	Thuja occidentalis	Green	290	13.7	29
Northern White Cedar	Thuja occidentalis	12.00%	310	27.3	45
Port Orford Cedar	Chamaecyparis lawsoniana	Green	390	21.6	45
Port Orford Cedar	Chamaecyparis lawsoniana	12.00%	430	43.1	88
Western Redcedar	Thuja plicata	Green	310	19.1	35.9
Western Redcedar	Thuja plicata	12.00%	320	31.4	51.7
Yellow Cedar	Cupressus nootkatensis	Green	420	21	44
Yellow Cedar	Cupressus nootkatensis	12.00%	440	43.5	77
Coast Douglas Fir	Pseudotsuga menziesii var. menziesii	Green	450	26.1	53
Coast Douglas Fir	Pseudotsuga menziesii var. menziesii	12.00%	480	49.9	85
Interior West Douglas Fir	Pseudotsuga Menziesii	Green	460	26.7	53
Interior West Douglas Fir	Pseudotsuga Menziesii	12.00%	500	51.2	87
Interior North Douglas Fir	Pseudotsuga menziesii var. glauca	Green	450	23.9	51
Interior North Douglas Fir	Pseudotsuga menziesii var. glauca	12.00%	480	47.6	90
Interior South Douglas Fir	Pseudotsuga lindleyana	Green	430	21.4	47
Interior South Douglas Fir	Pseudotsuga lindleyana	12.00%	460	43	82
balsam fir	Abies balsamea	Green	330	18.1	38
Balsam fir	Abies balsamea	12.00%	350	36.4	63
California red fir	Abies magnifica	Green	360	19	40
California red fir	Abies magnifica	12.00%	380	37.6	72.4
Grand fir	Abies grandis	Green	350	20.3	40
Grand fir	Abies grandis	12.00%	370	36.5	61.4
Noble fir	Abies procera	Green	370	20.8	43
Noble fir	Abies procera	12.00%	390	42.1	74
Pacific Silver Fir	Abies amabilis	Green	400	21.6	44
Pacific Silver Fir	Abies amabilis	12.00%	430	44.2	75
Subalpine Fir	Abies lasiocarpa	Green	310	15.9	34
Subalpine Fir	Abies lasiocarpa	12.00%	320	33.5	59
White Fir	Abies concolor	Green	370	20	41
White Fir	Abies concolor	12.00%	390	40	68
Eastern Hemlock	Tsuga canadensis	Green	380	21.2	44
Eastern Hemlock	Tsuga canadensis	12.00%	400	37.3	61
Mountain Hemlock	Tsuga mertensiana	Green	420	19.9	43
Mountain Hemlock	Tsuga mertensiana	12.00%	450	44.4	79
Western Hemlock	Tsuga heterophylla	Green	420	23.2	46
Western Hemlock	Tsuga heterophylla	12.00%	450	49	78
Western Larch	Larix occidentalis	Green	480	25.9	53
Western Larch	Larix occidentalis	12.00%	520	52.5	90
Eastern white pine	Pinus strobus	Green	340	16.8	34
Eastern white pine	Pinus strobus	12.00%	350	33.1	59
Jack Pine	Pinus banksiana	Green	400	20.3	41
Jack Pine	Pinus banksiana	12.00%	430	39	68
Loblolly Pine	Pinus taeda	Green	470	24.2	50
Loblolly Pine	Pinus taeda	12.00%	510	49.2	88
Lodgepole Pine	Pinus contorta	Green	380	18	38
Lodgepole Pine	Pinus contorta	12.00%	410	37	65
Longleaf Pine	Pinus palustris	Green	540	29.8	59
Longleaf Pine	Pinus palustris	12.00%	590	58.4	100
Pitch Pine	Pinus rigida	Green	470	20.3	47
Pitch Pine	Pinus rigida	12.00%	520	41	74
Pond Pine	Pinus serotina	Green	510	25.2	51
Pond Pine	Pinus serotina	12.00%	560	52	80
Ponderosa Pine	Pinus ponderosa	Green	380	16.9	35
Ponderosa Pine	Pinus ponderosa	12.00%	400	36.7	65
Red Pine	Pinus resinosa	Green	410	18.8	40
Red Pine	Pinus resinosa	12.00%	460	41.9	76
Sand Pine	Pinus clausa	Green	460	23.7	52
Sand Pine	Pinus clausa	12.00%	480	47.7	80
Shortleaf Pine	Pinus echinata	Green	470	24.3	51
Shortleaf Pine	Pinus echinata	12.00%	510	50.1	90
Slash Pine	Pinus elliottii	Green	540	26.3	60
Slash Pine	Pinus elliottii	12.00%	590	56.1	112
Spruce Pine	Pinus glabra	Green	410	19.6	41
Spruce Pine	Pinus glabra	12.00%	440	39	72
Sugar Pine	Pinus lambertiana	Green	340	17	34
Sugar Pine	Pinus lambertiana	12.00%	360	30.8	57
Virginia Pine	Pinus virginiana	Green	450	23.6	50
Virginia Pine	Pinus virginiana	12.00%	480	46.3	90
Western White Pine	Pinus monticola	Green	360	16.8	32
Western White Pine	Pinus monticola	12.00%	380	34.7	67
Redwood Old Growth	Sequoia sempervirens	Green	380	29	52
Redwood Old Growth	Sequoia sempervirens	12.00%	400	42.4	69
Redwood New Growth	Sequoia sempervirens	Green	340	21.4	41
Redwood New Growth	Sequoia sempervirens	12.00%	350	36	54
Black Spruce	Picea mariana	Green	380	19.6	42
Black Spruce	Picea mariana	12.00%	460	41.1	74
Engelmann Spruce	Picea engelmannii	Green	330	15	32
Engelmann Spruce	Picea engelmannii	12.00%	350	30.9	64
Red Spruce	Picea rubens	Green	370	18.8	41
Red Spruce	Picea rubens	12.00%	400	38.2	74
Sitka Spruce	Picea sitchensis	Green	330	16.2	34
Sitka Spruce	Picea sitchensis	12.00%	360	35.7	65
White spruce	Picea glauca	Green	370	17.7	39
White spruce	Picea glauca	12.00%	400	37.7	68
Tamarack spruce	Larix laricina	Green	490	24	50
Tamarack spruce	Larix laricina	12.00%	530	49.4	80

Bamboo properties:

Common name	Scientific name	Moisture content	Density (kg/m^{3})	Compressive strength (megapascals)	Flexural strength (megapascals)
Balku bans	Bambusa balcooa	green		45	73.7
Balku bans	Bambusa balcooa	air dry		54.15	81.1
Balku bans	Bambusa balcooa	8.5	820	69	151
Indian thorny bamboo	Bambusa bambos	9.5	710	61	143
Indian thorny bamboo	Bambusa bambos			43.05	37.15
Nodding Bamboo	Bambusa nutans	8	890	75	52.9
Nodding Bamboo	Bambusa nutans	87		46	52.4
Nodding Bamboo	Bambusa nutans	12		85	67.5
Nodding Bamboo	Bambusa nutans	88.3		44.7	88
Nodding Bamboo	Bambusa nutans	14		47.9	216
Clumping Bamboo	Bambusa pervariabilis			45.8	
Clumping Bamboo	Bambusa pervariabilis	5		79	80
Clumping Bamboo	Bambusa pervariabilis	20		35	37
Burmese bamboo	Bambusa polymorpha	95.1		32.1	28.3
	Bambusa spinosa	air dry		57	51.77
Indian timber bamboo	Bambusa tulda	73.6		40.7	51.1
Indian timber bamboo	Bambusa tulda	11.9		68	66.7
Indian timber bamboo	Bambusa tulda	8.6	910	79	194
dragon bamboo	Dendrocalamus giganteus	8	740	70	193
Hamilton's bamboo	Dendrocalamus hamiltonii	8.5	590	70	89
White bamboo	Dendrocalamus membranaceus	102		40.5	26.3
String Bamboo	Gigantochloa apus	54.3		24.1	102
String Bamboo	Gigantochloa apus	15.1		37.95	87.5
Java Black Bamboo	Gigantochloa atroviolacea	54		23.8	92.3
Java Black Bamboo	Gigantochloa atroviolacea	15		35.7	94.1
Giant Atter	Gigantochloa atter	72.3		26.4	98
Giant Atter	Gigantochloa atter	14.4		31.95	122.7
	Gigantochloa macrostachya	8	960	71	154
American Narrow-Leaved Bamboo	Guadua angustifolia			42	53.5
American Narrow-Leaved Bamboo	Guadua angustifolia			63.6	144.8
American Narrow-Leaved Bamboo	Guadua angustifolia			86.3	46
American Narrow-Leaved Bamboo	Guadua angustifolia			77.5	82
American Narrow-Leaved Bamboo	Guadua angustifolia	15		56	87
American Narrow-Leaved Bamboo	Guadua angustifolia			63.3	
American Narrow-Leaved Bamboo	Guadua angustifolia			28	
American Narrow-Leaved Bamboo	Guadua angustifolia			56.2	
American Narrow-Leaved Bamboo	Guadua angustifolia			38	
Berry Bamboo	Melocanna baccifera	12.8		69.9	57.6
Japanese timber bamboo	Phyllostachys bambusoides			51	
Japanese timber bamboo	Phyllostachys bambusoides	8	730	63	
Japanese timber bamboo	Phyllostachys bambusoides	64		44	
Japanese timber bamboo	Phyllostachys bambusoides	61		40	
Japanese timber bamboo	Phyllostachys bambusoides	9		71	
Japanese timber bamboo	Phyllostachys bambusoides	9		74	
Japanese timber bamboo	Phyllostachys bambusoides	12		54	
Tortoise shell bamboo	Phyllostachys edulis			44.6	
Tortoise shell bamboo	Phyllostachys edulis	75		67	
Tortoise shell bamboo	Phyllostachys edulis	15		71	
Tortoise shell bamboo	Phyllostachys edulis	6		108	
Tortoise shell bamboo	Phyllostachys edulis	0.2		147	
Tortoise shell bamboo	Phyllostachys edulis	5		117	51
Tortoise shell bamboo	Phyllostachys edulis	30		44	55
Tortoise shell bamboo	Phyllostachys edulis	12.5	603	60.3	
Tortoise shell bamboo	Phyllostachys edulis	10.3	530		83
Early Bamboo	Phyllostachys praecox	28.5	827	79.3	
Oliveri	Thyrsostachys oliveri	53		46.9	61.9
Oliveri	Thyrsostachys oliveri	7.8		58	90

== Hard versus soft ==
It is common to classify wood as either softwood or hardwood. The wood from conifers (e.g. pine) is called softwood, and the wood from dicotyledons (usually broad-leaved trees, e.g. oak) is called hardwood. These names are somewhat misleading, as hardwoods are not necessarily hard, and softwoods are not necessarily soft. The well-known balsa (a hardwood) is actually softer than any commercial softwood. Conversely, some softwoods (e.g. yew) are harder than many hardwoods.

There is a strong relationship between the properties of wood and the properties of the particular tree that yielded it, at least for certain species. For example, in loblolly pine, wind exposure and stem position greatly affect the hardness of wood, as well as compression wood content. The density of wood varies with species. The density of a wood correlates with its strength (mechanical properties). For example, mahogany is a medium-dense hardwood that is excellent for fine furniture crafting, whereas balsa is light, making it useful for model building. One of the densest woods is black ironwood.

== Chemistry ==
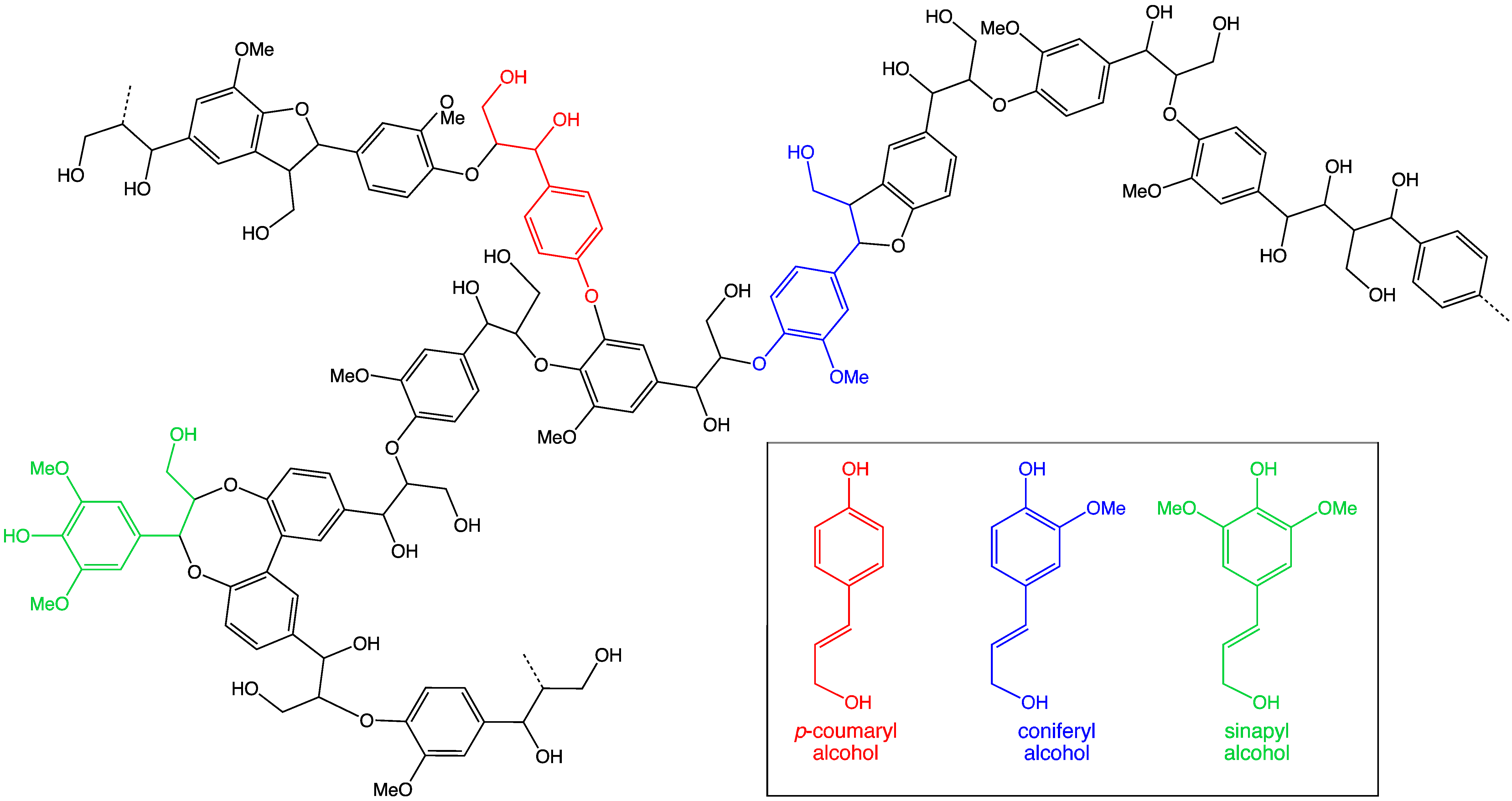
Chemical structure of lignin, which makes up about 25% of wood dry matter and is responsible for many of its properties.

The chemical composition of wood varies from species to species, but is approximately 50% carbon, 42% oxygen, 6% hydrogen, 1% nitrogen, and 1% other elements (mainly calcium, potassium, sodium, magnesium, iron, and manganese) by weight. Wood also contains sulfur, chlorine, silicon, phosphorus, and other elements in small quantity.

Aside from water, wood has three main components. Cellulose, a crystalline polymer derived from glucose, constitutes about 41–43%. Next in abundance is hemicellulose, which is around 20% in deciduous trees but near 30% in conifers. It is mainly five-carbon sugars that are linked in an irregular manner, in contrast to the cellulose. Lignin is the third component at around 27% in coniferous wood vs. 23% in deciduous trees. Lignin confers the hydrophobic properties reflecting the fact that it is based on aromatic rings. These three components are interwoven, and direct covalent linkages exist between the lignin and the hemicellulose. A major focus of the paper industry is the separation of the lignin from the cellulose, from which paper is made.

In chemical terms, the difference between hardwood and softwood is reflected in the composition of the constituent lignin. Hardwood lignin is primarily derived from sinapyl alcohol and coniferyl alcohol. Softwood lignin is mainly derived from coniferyl alcohol.

=== Extractives ===
Aside from the structural polymers, i.e. cellulose, hemicellulose and lignin (lignocellulose), wood contains a large variety of non-structural constituents, composed of low molecular weight organic compounds, called extractives. These compounds are present in the extracellular space and can be extracted from the wood using different neutral solvents, such as acetone. Analogous content is present in the so-called exudate produced by trees in response to mechanical damage or after being attacked by insects or fungi. Unlike the structural constituents, the composition of extractives varies over wide ranges and depends on many factors. The amount and composition of extractives differs between tree species, various parts of the same tree, and depends on genetic factors and growth conditions, such as climate and geography.

For example, slower growing trees and higher parts of trees have higher content of extractives. Generally, the softwood is richer in extractives than the hardwood. Their concentration increases from the cambium to the pith. Barks and branches also contain extractives. Although extractives represent a small fraction of the wood content, usually less than 10%, they are extraordinarily diverse and thus characterize the chemistry of the wood species. Most extractives are secondary metabolites and some of them serve as precursors to other chemicals. Wood extractives display different activities, some of them are produced in response to wounds, and some of them participate in natural defense against insects and fungi.

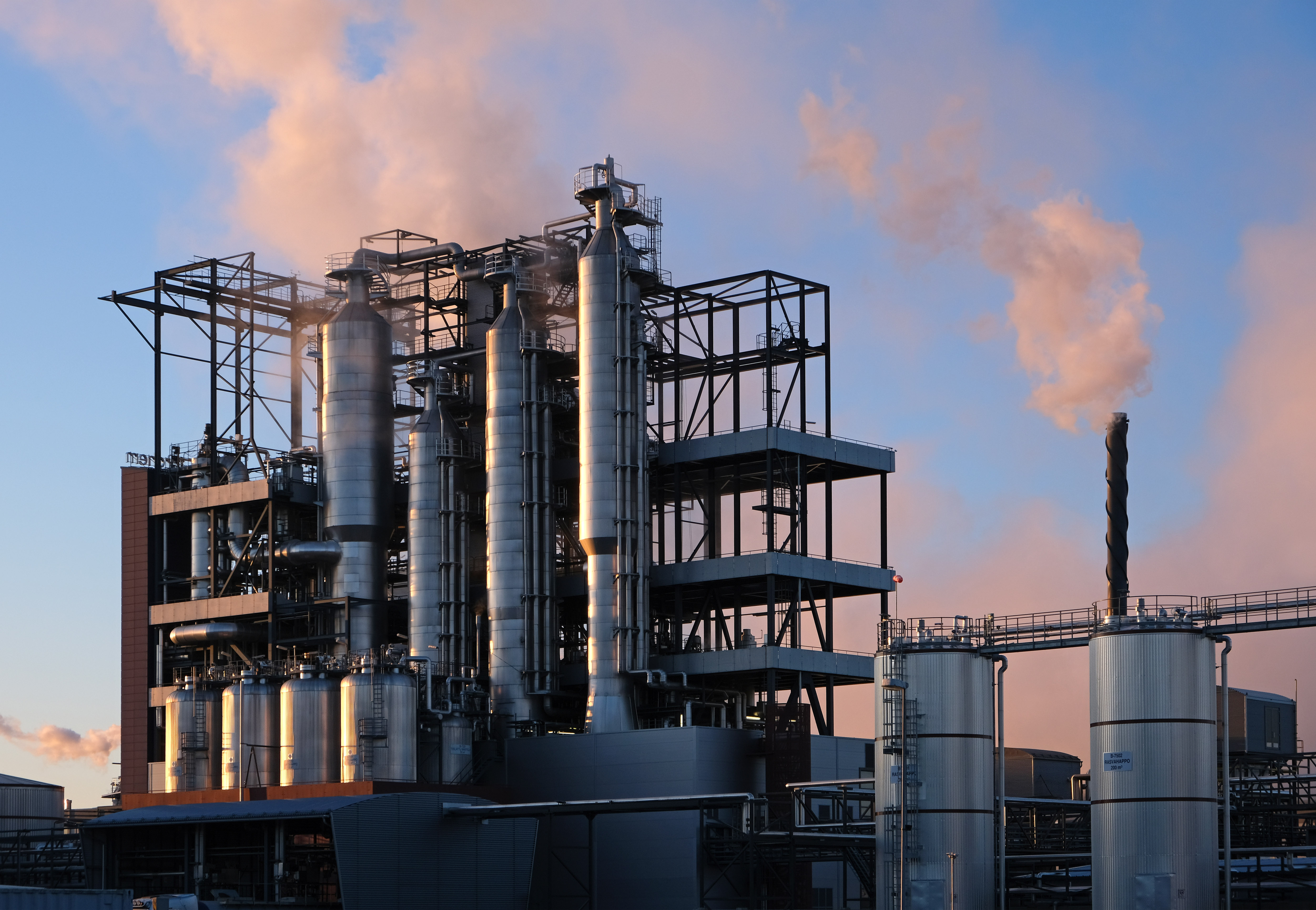
Forchem tall oil refinery in Rauma, Finland

These compounds contribute to various physical and chemical properties of the wood, such as wood color, fragnance, durability, acoustic properties, hygroscopicity, adhesion, and drying. Considering these impacts, wood extractives also affect the properties of pulp and paper, and importantly cause many problems in paper industry. Some extractives are surface-active substances and unavoidably affect the surface properties of paper, such as water adsorption, friction and strength.

Most wood extractives are lipophilic and only a little part is water-soluble. The lipophilic portion of extractives, which is collectively referred as wood resin, contains fats and fatty acids, sterols and steryl esters, terpenes, terpenoids, resin acids, and waxes. The heating of resin, i.e. distillation, vaporizes the volatile terpenes and leaves the solid component – rosin. The concentrated liquid of volatile compounds extracted during steam distillation is called essential oil. Distillation of oleoresin obtained from many pines provides rosin and turpentine.

Most extractives can be categorized into three groups: aliphatic compounds, terpenes and phenolic compounds. The latter are more water-soluble and usually are absent in the resin.

- Aliphatic compounds include fatty acids, fatty alcohols and their esters with glycerol, fatty alcohols (waxes) and sterols (steryl esters). Hydrocarbons, such as alkanes, are also present in the wood. Suberin is a polyester, made of suberin acids and glycerol, mainly found in barks. Fats serve as a source of energy for the wood cells. The most common wood sterol is sitosterol, and less commonly sitostanol, citrostadienol, campesterol or cholesterol.
- The main terpenes occurring in the softwood include mono-, sesqui- and diterpenes. Meanwhile, the terpene composition of the hardwood is considerably different, consisting of triterpenoids, polyprenols and other higher terpenes. Examples of mono-, di- and sesquiterpenes are α- and β-pinenes, 3-carene, β-myrcene, limonene, thujaplicins, α- and β-phellandrenes, α-muurolene, δ-cadinene, α- and δ-cadinols, α- and β-cedrenes, juniperol, longifolene, cis-abienol, borneol, pinifolic acid, nootkatin, chanootin, phytol, geranyl-linalool, β-epimanool, manoyloxide, pimaral and pimarol. Resin acids are usually tricyclic terpenoids, examples of which are pimaric acid, sandaracopimaric acid, isopimaric acid, abietic acid, levopimaric acid, palustric acid, neoabietic acid and dehydroabietic acid. Bicyclic resin acids are also found, such as lambertianic acid, communic acid, mercusic acid and secodehydroabietic acid. Cycloartenol, betulin and squalene are triterpenoids purified from hardwood. Examples of wood polyterpenes are rubber (cis-polypren), gutta percha (trans-polypren), gutta-balatá (trans-polypren) and betulaprenols (acyclic polyterpenoids). The mono- and sesquiterpenes of the softwood are responsible for the typical smell of pine forest. Many monoterpenoids, such as β-myrcene, are used in the preparation of flavors and fragrances. Tropolones, such as hinokitiol and other thujaplicins, are present in decay-resistant trees and display fungicidal and insecticidal properties. Tropolones strongly bind metal ions and can cause digester corrosion in the process kraft pulping. Owing to their metal-binding and ionophoric properties, especially thujaplicins are used in physiology experiments. Different other in-vitro biological activities of thujaplicins have been studied, such as insecticidal, anti-browning, anti-viral, anti-bacterial, anti-fungal, anti-proliferative and anti-oxidant.
- Phenolic compounds are especially found in the hardwood and the bark. The best-known wood phenolic constituents are stilbenes (e.g. pinosylvin), lignans (e.g. pinoresinol, conidendrin, plicatic acid, hydroxymatairesinol), norlignans (e.g. nyasol, puerosides A and B, hydroxysugiresinol, sequirin-C), tannins (e.g. gallic acid, ellagic acid), flavonoids (e.g. chrysin, taxifolin, catechin, genistein). Most of the phenolic compounds have fungicidal properties and protect the wood from fungal decay. Together with the neolignans the phenolic compounds influence on the color of the wood. Resin acids and phenolic compounds are the main toxic contaminants present in the untreated effluents from pulping. Polyphenolic compounds are one of the most abundant biomolecules produced by plants, such as flavonoids and tannins. Tannins are used in leather industry and have shown to exhibit different biological activities. Flavonoids are diverse, widely distributed in the plant kingdom, and have numerous biological activities and roles.

== Uses ==
Main global producers of roundwood by type.

World production of roundwood by type

=== Production ===
Global production of roundwood rose from 3.5 billion m³ in 2000 to 4 billion m³ in 2021. In 2021, wood fuel was the main product with a 49 percent share of the total (2 billion m³), followed by coniferous industrial roundwood with 30 percent (1.2 billion m³) and non-coniferous industrial roundwood with 21 percent (0.9 billion m³). Asia and the Americas are the two main producing regions, accounting for 29 and 28 percent of the total roundwood production, respectively; Africa and Europe have similar shares of 20–21 percent, while Oceania produces the remaining 2 percent.

=== Fuel ===
Wood has a long history of being used as fuel, which continues to this day, mostly in rural areas of the world. Hardwood is preferred over softwood because it creates less smoke and burns longer. Adding a woodstove or fireplace to a home is often felt to add ambiance and warmth. Many lower- and middle-income countries rely on wood for energy purposes (especially cooking).

=== Pulpwood ===
Pulpwood is wood that is raised specifically for use in making paper.

=== Construction ===
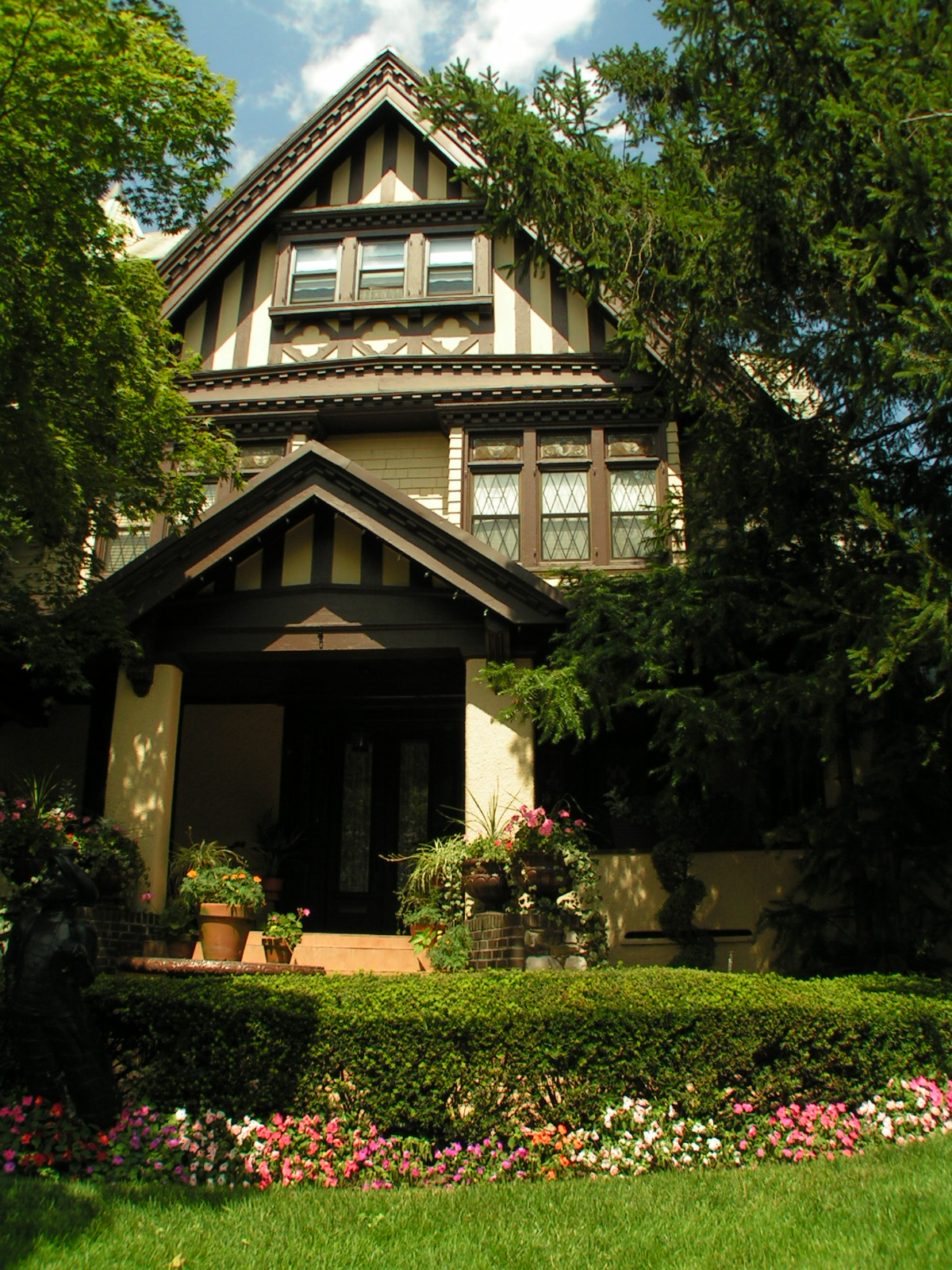
The Saitta House, Dyker Heights, Brooklyn, New York built in 1899 is made of and decorated in wood.

Map of importers and exporters of forest products including wood in 2021

Wood has been an important construction material since humans began building shelters, houses and boats. Nearly all boats were made out of wood until the late 19th century, and wood remains in common use today in boat construction. Elm in particular was used for this purpose as it resisted decay as long as it was kept wet (it also served for water pipe before the advent of more modern plumbing).

Wood to be used for construction work is commonly known as lumber in North America. Elsewhere, lumber usually refers to felled trees, and the word for sawn planks ready for use is timber. In medieval Europe oak was the wood of choice for all wood construction, including beams, walls, doors, and floors. Today a wider variety of woods is used: solid wood doors are often made from poplar, small-knotted pine, and Douglas fir.

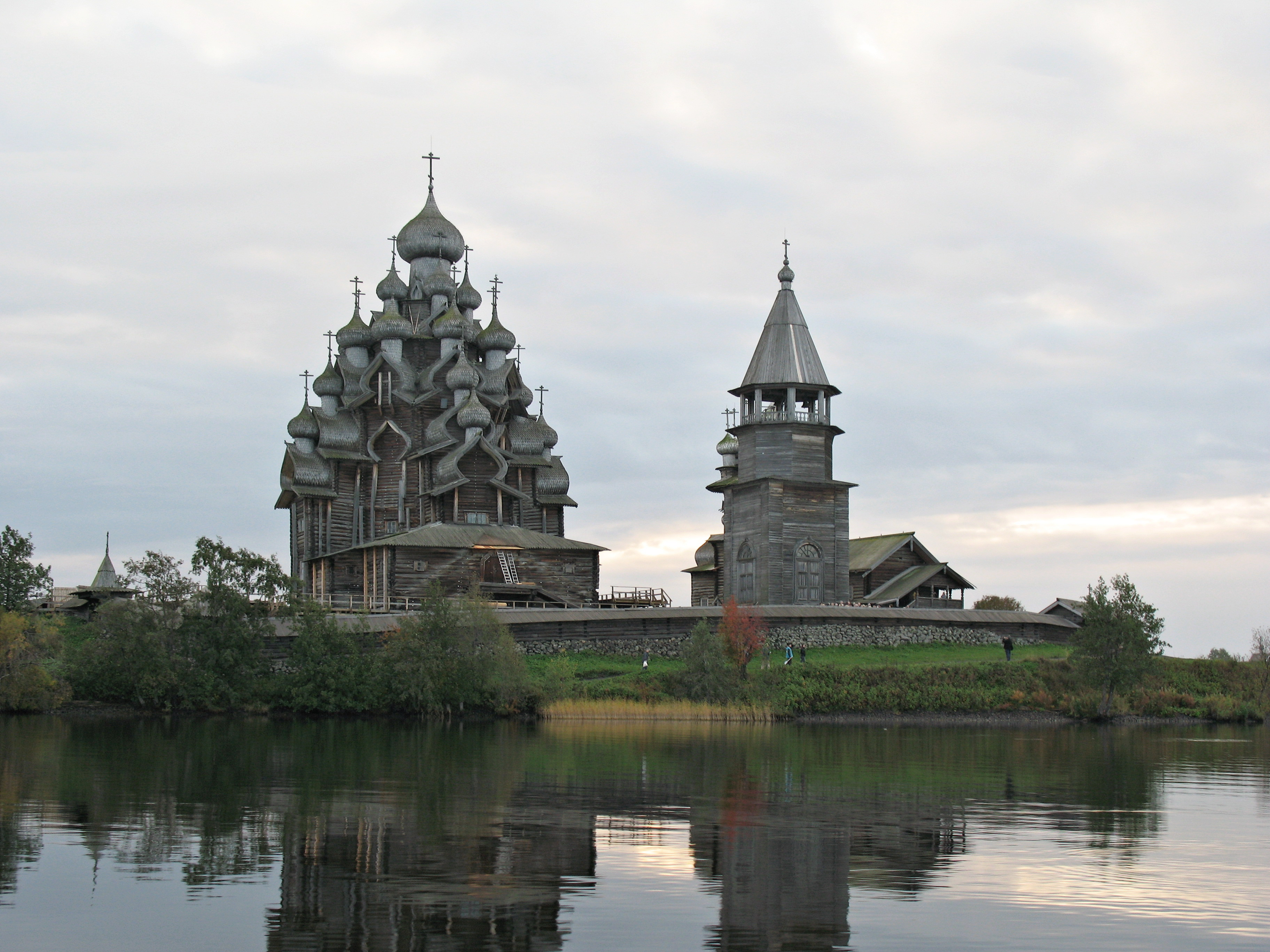
The churches of Kizhi, Russia are among a handful of World Heritage Sites built entirely of wood, without metal joints. See Kizhi Pogost for more details.

New domestic housing in many parts of the world today is commonly made from timber-framed construction. Engineered wood products are becoming a bigger part of the construction industry. They may be used in both residential and commercial buildings as structural and aesthetic materials.

In buildings made of other materials, wood will still be found as a supporting material, especially in roof construction, in interior doors and their frames, and as exterior cladding.

Wood is also commonly used as shuttering material to form the mold into which concrete is poured during reinforced concrete construction.

==== Flooring ====
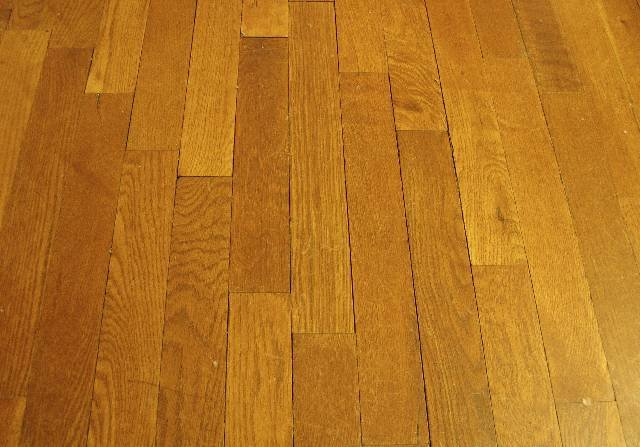
Wood can be cut into straight planks and made into a wood flooring.

A solid wood floor is a floor laid with planks or battens created from a single piece of timber, usually a hardwood. Since wood is hydroscopic (it acquires and loses moisture from the ambient conditions around it) this potential instability effectively limits the length and width of the boards. Solid hardwood flooring is usually cheaper than engineered timbers and damaged areas can be sanded down and refinished repeatedly, the number of times being limited only by the thickness of wood above the tongue. Solid hardwood floors were originally used for structural purposes, being installed perpendicular to the wooden support beams of a building (the joists or bearers) and solid construction timber is still often used for sports floors as well as most traditional wood blocks, mosaics and parquetry.

==== Engineered products ====
Engineered wood products, glued building products "engineered" for application-specific performance requirements, are often used in construction and industrial applications. Glued engineered wood products are manufactured by bonding together wood strands, veneers, lumber or other forms of wood fiber with glue to form a larger, more efficient composite structural unit.

These products include glued laminated timber (glulam), wood structural panels (including plywood, oriented strand board and composite panels), laminated veneer lumber (LVL) and other structural composite lumber (SCL) products, parallel strand lumber, and I-joists. Approximately 100 million cubic meters of wood was consumed for this purpose in 1991. The trends suggest that particle board and fiber board will overtake plywood.

Wood unsuitable for construction in its native form may be broken down mechanically (into fibers or chips) or chemically (into cellulose) and used as a raw material for other building materials, such as engineered wood, as well as chipboard, hardboard, and medium-density fiberboard (MDF). Such wood derivatives are widely used: wood fibers are an important component of most paper, and cellulose is used as a component of some synthetic materials. Wood derivatives can be used for kinds of flooring, for example laminate flooring.

=== Furniture and utensils ===
Wood has always been used extensively for furniture, such as chairs and beds. It is also used for tool handles and cutlery, such as chopsticks, toothpicks, and other utensils, like the wooden spoon and pencil.

=== Other ===
Further developments include new lignin glue applications, recyclable food packaging, rubber tire replacement applications, anti-bacterial medical agents, and high strength fabrics or composites. As scientists and engineers further learn and develop new techniques to extract various components from wood, or alternatively to modify wood, for example by adding components to wood, new more advanced products will appear on the marketplace. Moisture content electronic monitoring can also enhance next generation wood protection.

=== Art ===
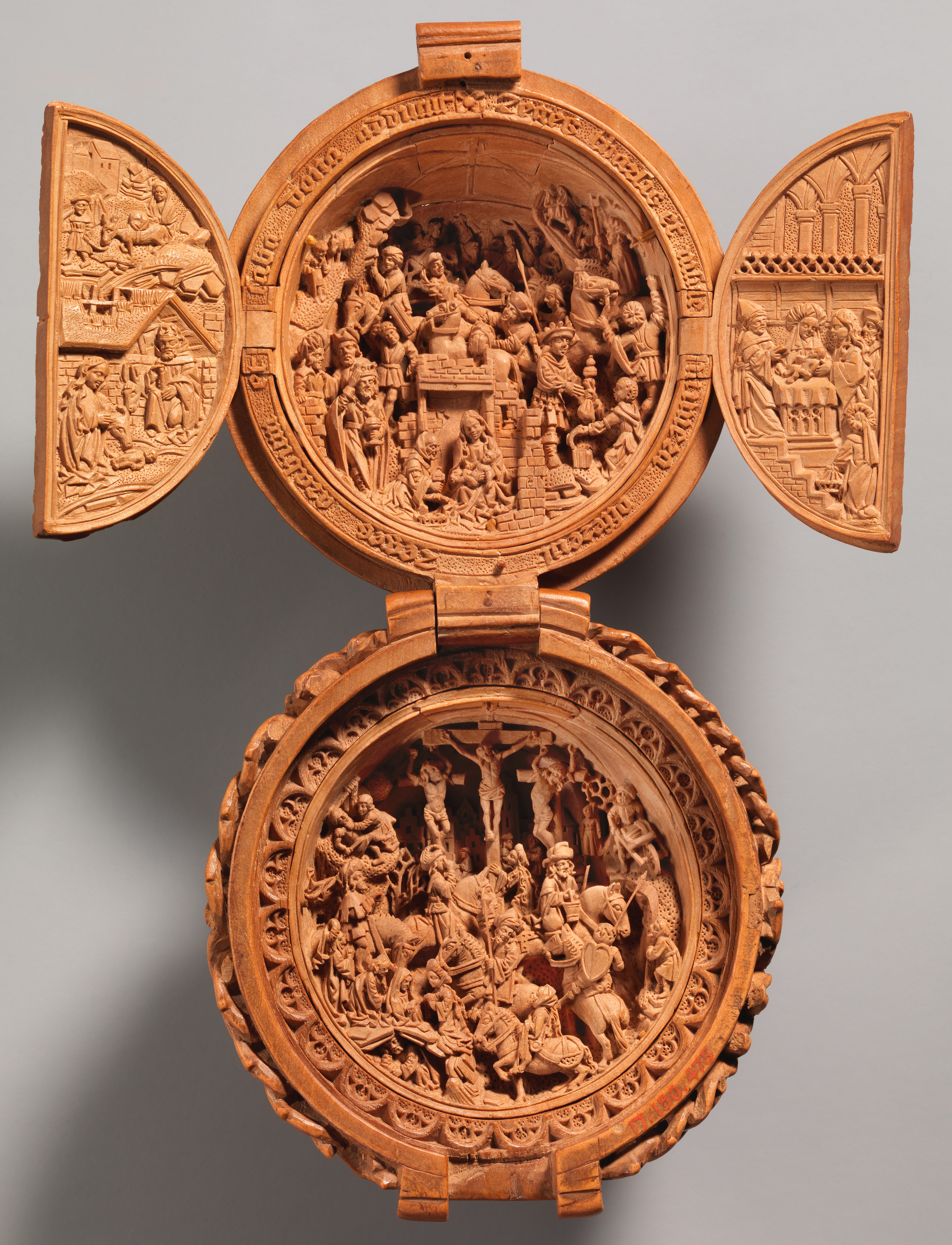
Prayer Bead with the Adoration of the Magi and the Crucifixion, Gothic boxwood miniature

Wood has long been used as an artistic medium. It has been used to make sculptures and carvings for millennia. Examples include the totem poles carved by North American indigenous people from conifer trunks, often Western Red Cedar (Thuja plicata).

Other uses of wood in the arts include:

- Woodcut printmaking and engraving
- Wood can be a surface to paint on, such as in panel painting
- Many musical instruments are made mostly or entirely of wood

=== Sports and recreational equipment ===
Many types of sports equipment are made of wood, or were constructed of wood in the past. For example, cricket bats are typically made of white willow. The baseball bats which are legal for use in Major League Baseball are frequently made of ash wood or hickory, and in recent years have been constructed from maple even though that wood is somewhat more fragile. National Basketball Association courts have been traditionally made out of parquetry.

Many other types of sports and recreation equipment, such as skis, ice hockey sticks, lacrosse sticks and archery bows, were commonly made of wood in the past, but have since been replaced with more modern materials such as aluminium, titanium or composite materials such as fiberglass and carbon fiber. One noteworthy example of this trend is the family of golf clubs commonly known as the woods, the heads of which were traditionally made of persimmon wood in the early days of the game of golf, but are now generally made of metal or (especially in the case of drivers) carbon-fiber composites.

== Bacterial degradation ==
Little is known about the bacteria that degrade cellulose. Symbiotic bacteria in Xylophaga may play a role in the degradation of sunken wood. Alphaproteobacteria, Flavobacteria, Actinomycetota, Clostridia, and Bacteroidota have been detected in wood submerged for over a year.

== See also ==
- Acetylated wood
- Ancient Chinese wooden architecture
- Ash burner
- Burl
- Carpentry
- Certified wood
- Conservation and restoration of waterlogged wood
- Conservation and restoration of wooden artifacts
- Driftwood
- Dunnage
- Forestry
- Fossil wood
- Furfurylated wood
- Green building and wood
- Helsinki Central Library Oodi
- International Wood Products Journal
- List of tallest wooden buildings
- List of woods
- Log building
- Log cabin
- Log house
- Mineral bonded wood wool board
- Mjøstårnet
- Natural building
- Parquetry
- Pallet crafts
- Pellet fuel
- Petrified wood
- Pine tar
- Plyscraper
- Pulpwood
- Reclaimed lumber
- Sawdust brandy
- Sawdust
- Thermally modified wood
- Timber framing
- Timber pilings
- Timber recycling
- Tinder
- Wood ash
- Wood degradation
- Wood drying
- Wood economy
- Wood lagging
- Wood preservation
- Wood stabilization
- Wood warping
- Wood wool
- Wood-decay fungus
- Wooden box
- Wood-plastic composite
- Woodturning
- Woodworm
- Xylology
- Xylophagy
- Xylotheque
- Xylotomy
- Yakisugi

== Sources ==
This article incorporates text from a free content work. Licensed under CC BY-SA IGO 3.0 (license statement/permission). Text taken from World Food and Agriculture – Statistical Yearbook 2023, FAO.

This article incorporates text from a free content work. Licensed under CC BY 4.0 (license statement/permission). Text taken from World Food and Agriculture – Statistical Yearbook 2025, Food and Agriculture Organization of the United Nations.
