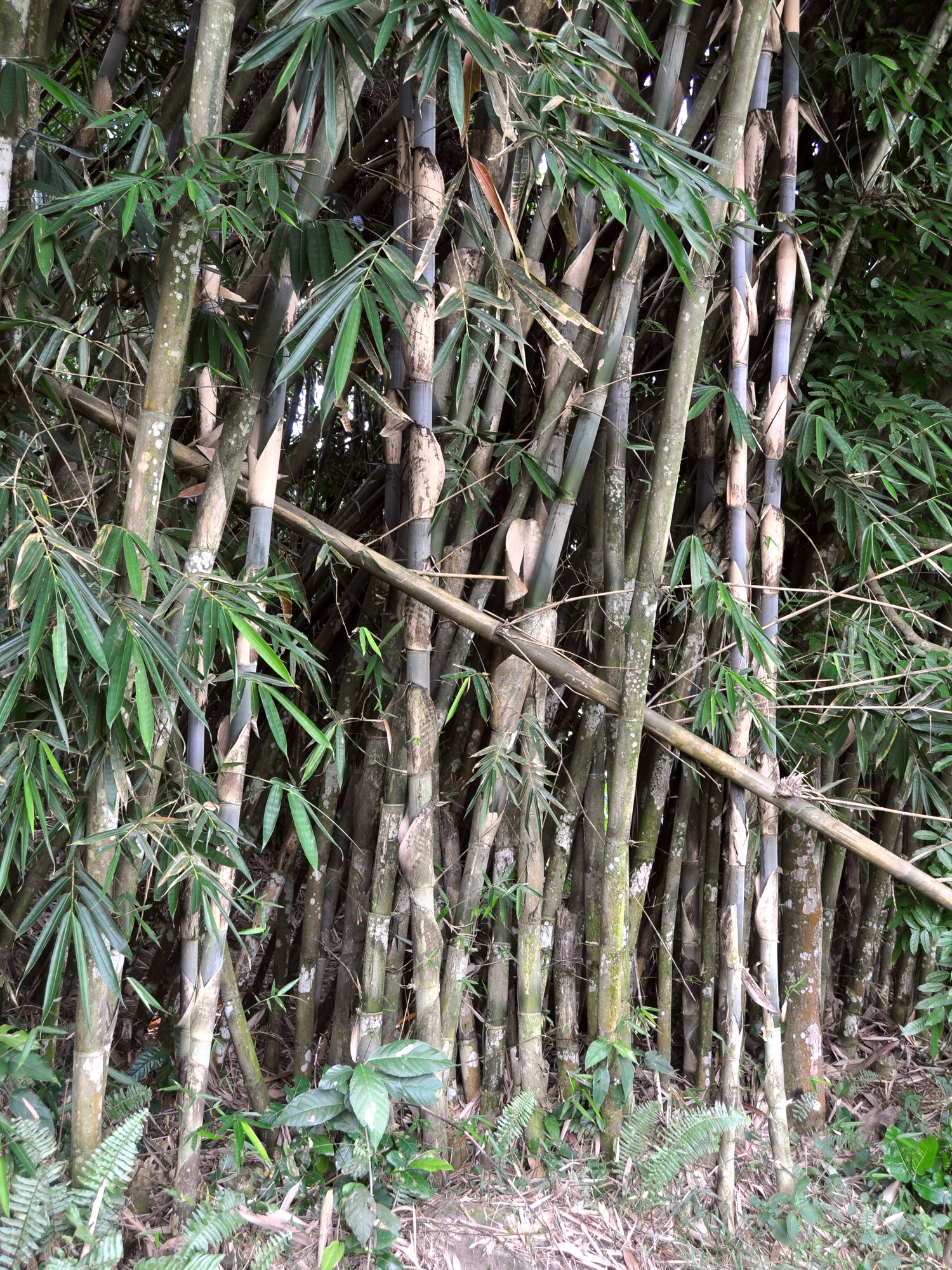

Scientific classification
- Kingdom: Plantae
- Clade: Embryophytes
- Clade: Tracheophytes
- Clade: Angiosperms
- Clade: Monocots
- Clade: Commelinids
- Order: Poales
- Family: Poaceae
- Genus: Gigantochloa
- Species: G. apus

Binomial name
- Gigantochloa apus (Schult.f.) Kurz ex Munro

= Gigantochloa apus =

Species of plant

Gigantochloa apus is a species of bamboo native to tropical biomes.
