= Thyrsostachys oliveri =

Scientific classification
- Kingdom: Plantae
- Clade: Tracheophytes
- Clade: Angiosperms
- Clade: Monocots
- Clade: Commelinids
- Order: Poales
- Family: Poaceae
- Genus: Thyrsostachys
- Species: T. oliveri

Binomial name
- Thyrsostachys oliveri Gamble

Species of bamboo

Thyrsostachys oliveri is a species of edible-seeded bamboo from Yunnan, Myanmar, Laos and Thailand; and also naturalised in Assam and Bangladesh. As a moderately large species of bamboo with tall and straight culms has also been a local source of material for construction in some southeast Asian regions.
