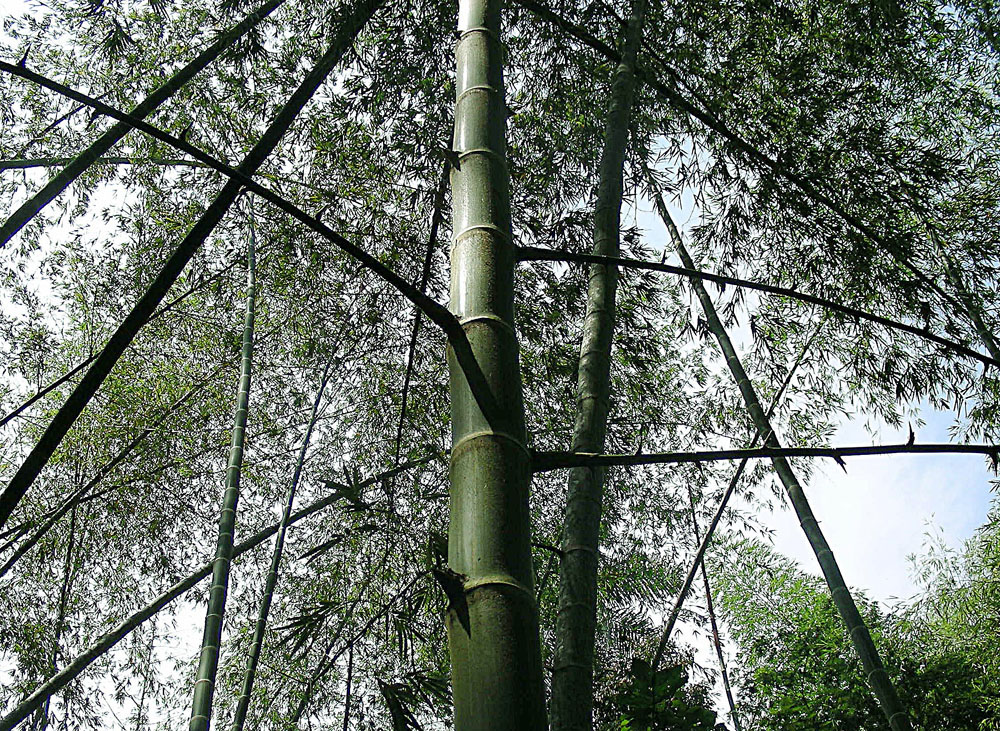

Scientific classification
- Kingdom: Plantae
- Clade: Tracheophytes
- Clade: Angiosperms
- Clade: Monocots
- Clade: Commelinids
- Order: Poales
- Family: Poaceae
- Genus: Guadua
- Species: G. angustifolia

Binomial name
- Guadua angustifolia Kunth

Synonyms
- 7 synonyms: Arundarbor guadua (Bonpl.) Kuntze; Bambusa guadua Bonpl.; Nastus guadua (Bonpl.) Spreng.; Bambusa inermis Caldas; Guadua angustifolia var. bicolor Londoño; Guadua angustifolia var. nigra Londoño; Guadua intermedia E.Fourn.

= Guadua angustifolia =

Species of grass

Guadua angustifolia also known as the Colombian timber bamboo and Colombian giant thorny, is a species of clumping bamboo in the grass family Poaceae. It is found from Central to South America. It has a long flowering cycle, estimated to be between 30 and 35 years.
