= Mineral bonded wood wool board =

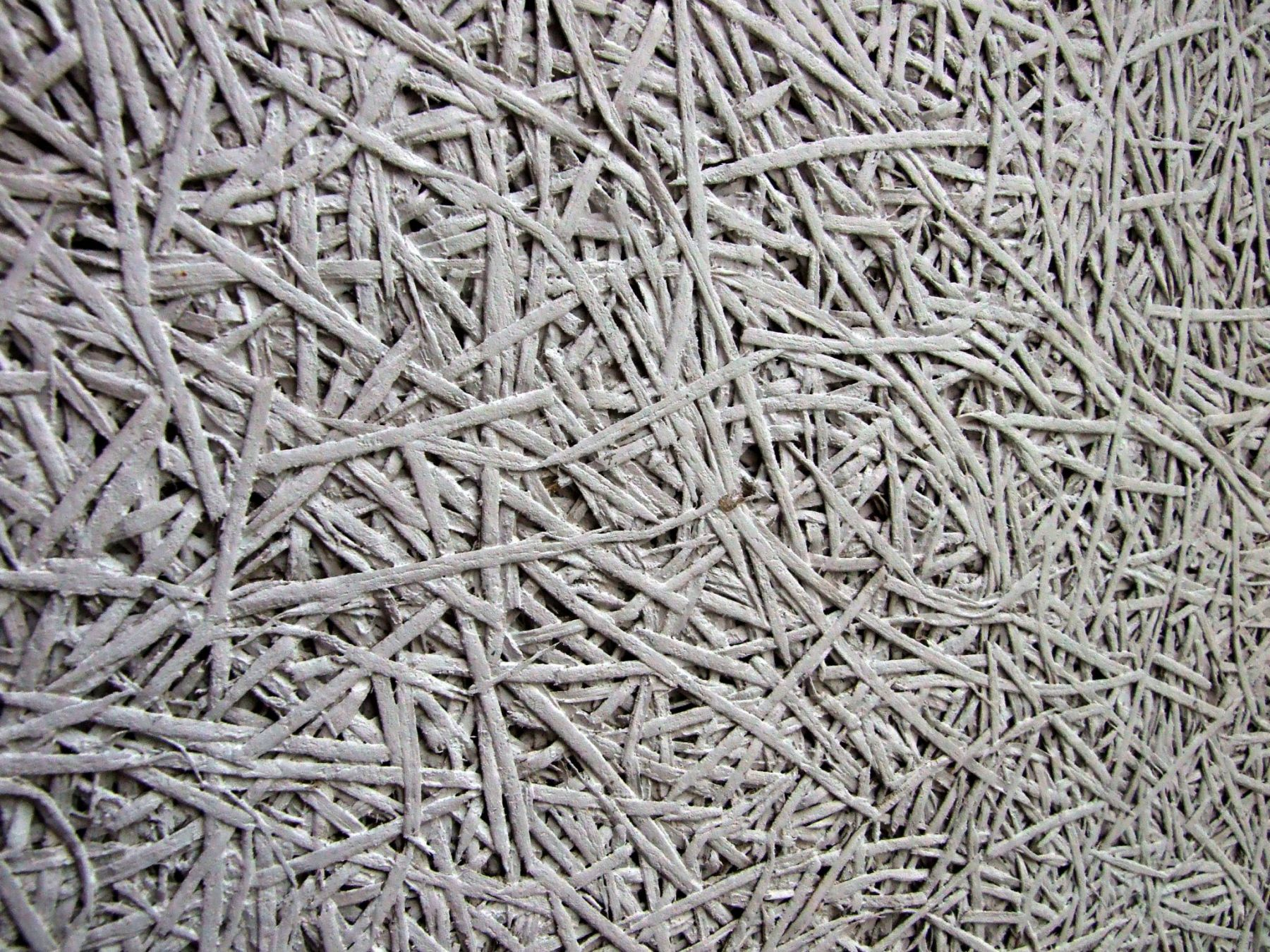
Wood wool lightweight board (surface structure)

Mineral bonded wood wool boards (WW boards) are building boards made of wood wool fibres, water and the binding agents cement, caustic magnesia and gypsum. Mineral bound wood wool boards are used in a wide range of applications, e.g., thermal insulation, acoustic insulation, indoor decoration, etc.

Historical brand names include Ceban, Erulit, Fibrolith, Frankotekt, Hapec, Hapri, Heraklith, Hincolith, Holwolith, Klimalit, Lenzolite, Lignolith, Lossius and Saalith. Because of the term wool, laypersons sometimes mistake wood wool boards with wood fibre insulating boards, a different insulation material that does not contain mineral bindings.

In German speaking areas, because of their surface also known as sauerkraut plates.

== History ==
Wood wool boards were standardised in 1938 according to DIN 1101 and are therefore among the oldest insulation materials made of renewable raw materials. This standard was replaced by European Standard EN 13168 in January 2002.

== Materials and production ==
Wood wool boards and wood-wool layers in composite boards are generally manufactured using coniferous wood species, mainly spruce and pine. The wood logs are processed to make wood fibres of various widths, generally between 1mm and 3mm. After drying the wood, it is planed into long fibres in a wood wool machine. The fibres are then mixed with the binding agent (caustic magnesite or cement) in a water solution, in a mixer. Wood wool boards which are bound with magnesite are easily distinguishable by their beige colour. Boards which are bound with grey cement have a greyish colour. White cement is used to maintain the natural colour of the wood. The combination of wood wool fibres and binding agent is automatically fed into a moulding line to be shaped according to the required board dimensions (length, width and thickness). After pre-compaction, the endless row of moulds filled with the mixture is separated into individual moulds with a saw. The moulds are stacked on top of each other, pressed again and weighted so that they are perfectly flush with each other. After hardening of the binder (usually between 24 and 48 hours) the moulds are removed, the semi-finished boards are dried and cut to raw size. The products are then taken to the maturation stock where they will remain for a period that depends on type of binder and thickness. The boards can be subject to further processing in the finishing department, e.g. in case a special edge profile or board shape is needed. The whole production process is carried out in such way that the product meets the requirements set in EN 13168.

== Properties ==
Wood wool boards are rigid and very strong. Their thermal conductivity is higher than other insulation material between 0.070 and 0.100 W/(m.K) compared with mineral wool insulation materials to approximately 0.040 W/(m.K). But their specific thermal capacity and therefore summer heat insulation is higher than other materials, e.g. when installed in lofts’ pitched roofs, wood wool boards offer better properties than basic dry wall systems in terms of summer heat insulation. Wood wool boards can be made to offer a high degree of sound insulation (e.g. if they are plastered) or sound absorption performance (e.g. non-plastered boards) and a good moisture-regulating capacity thanks to their open structure. In the harmonized Euroclass system of reaction to fire performance of building products, wood wool boards can be classified as A2-s1, d0 according to EN 13501-1 Fire classification of construction products and building elements; Part 1: Classification using data from reaction to fire tests.

In combination with other insulation materials (e.g mineral wool), the resistance against fire can reach up to two hundred forty minutes depending on the product’s thickness and setup.

== Multi-layer lightweight building boards ==
Wood wool composite boards (WW-C boards) are a two- or three-layer combination of wood wool boards and various insulation materials (mineral fibre boards, EPS boards, XPS boards, etc…) The thickness of the wood wool layer in a composite board is at least 5 mm. Due to the higher insulation effect of the mineral or synthetic insulation layer, composite boards provide a higher level of thermal insulation relative to single wood wool boards.

== See also ==
- Coarse chipboard
- Hardboard
- Medium-density fibreboard
- Particle board
