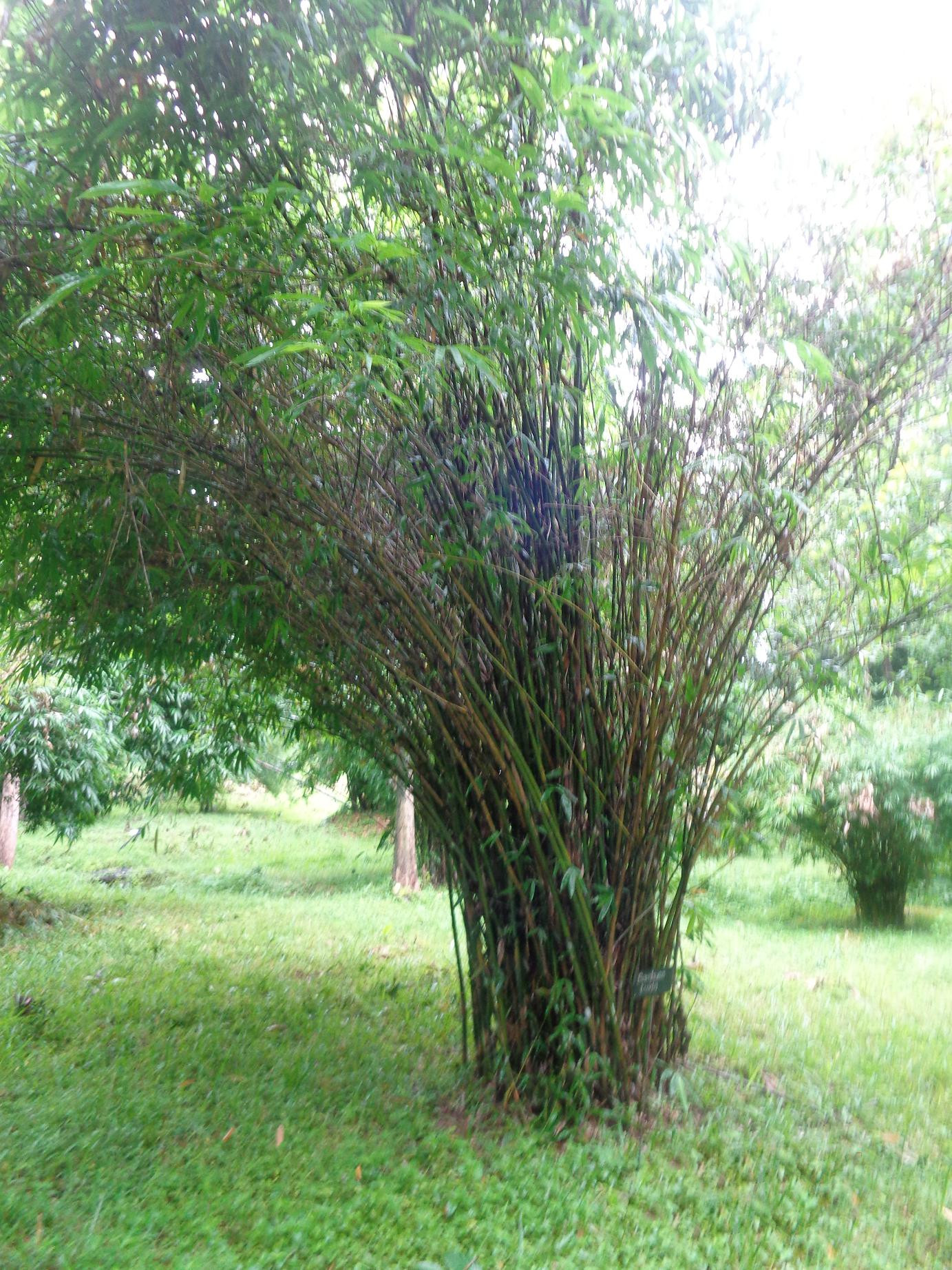

Scientific classification
- Kingdom: Plantae
- Clade: Tracheophytes
- Clade: Angiosperms
- Clade: Monocots
- Clade: Commelinids
- Order: Poales
- Family: Poaceae
- Genus: Bambusa
- Species: B. tulda

Binomial name
- Bambusa tulda Roxb.

Synonyms
- Dendrocalamus tulda (Roxb.) Voigt

= Bambusa tulda =

Species of grass

Bambusa tulda, or Indian timber bamboo (alternatively spineless Indian bamboo or Bengal bamboo), is considered to be one of the most useful of bamboo species. It is native to the Indian subcontinent, Indochina, Tibet, and Yunnan, and naturalized in Iraq, Puerto Rico, and parts of South America.

B. tulda is used extensively by the paper pulp industry in India. It can grow to a height of 15 m and a thickness of 8 cm. The single most important fact about Bambusa tulda is its incredible tensile strength; up to 60,000 pounds (27,000 Kg) per square inch. It is commonly found in southeastern Asia.

== Habit ==
It is a tall, dull green colored bamboo species with greyish green when mature. It is composed of few closely growing culms. It reaches a height of 6–23 m.

== Appearance ==
Young culms are green, which become greyish green when mature and brown when drying. Young shoots are yellowish green in color with a powdery top. Culms are covered with white blooms. A band of white hairs occurs above the nodes. Branching occurs from the base to top. Aerial roots reach up to few nodes above. Internode length is 30–60 cm, and diameter is 0.8–1.2 cm. Culm walls are very thick. Nodes are prominent.

Culm sheaths are triangular with a conical blade, and straw-colored. The sheath proper is asymmetrical and 15–32 cm in length and 25–34 cm wide. Blade length is 5–10 cm. Auricles are unequal where the large one is rounded and situated on the side of the blade. The upper surface of the sheath is covered with blackish-brown hairs. The lower surface of the sheath is not hairy. Sheaths fall off early.
