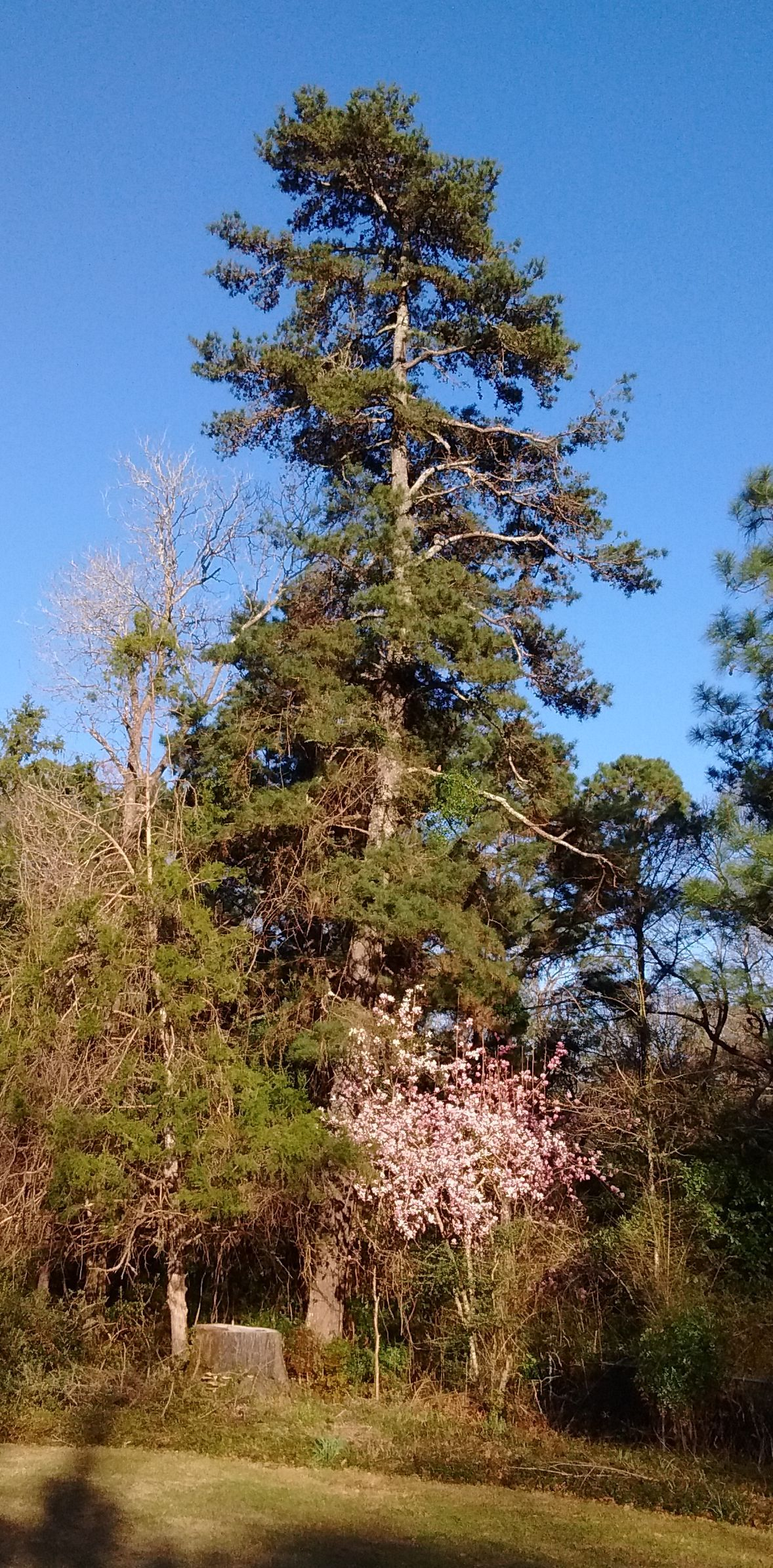

Conservation status
- Least Concern (IUCN 3.1)

Scientific classification
- Kingdom: Plantae
- Clade: Tracheophytes
- Clade: Gymnosperms
- Division: Pinophyta
- Class: Pinopsida
- Order: Pinales
- Family: Pinaceae
- Genus: Pinus
- Subgenus: P. subg. Pinus
- Section: P. sect. Trifoliae
- Subsection: P. subsect. Australes
- Species: P. glabra

Binomial name
- Pinus glabra Walter
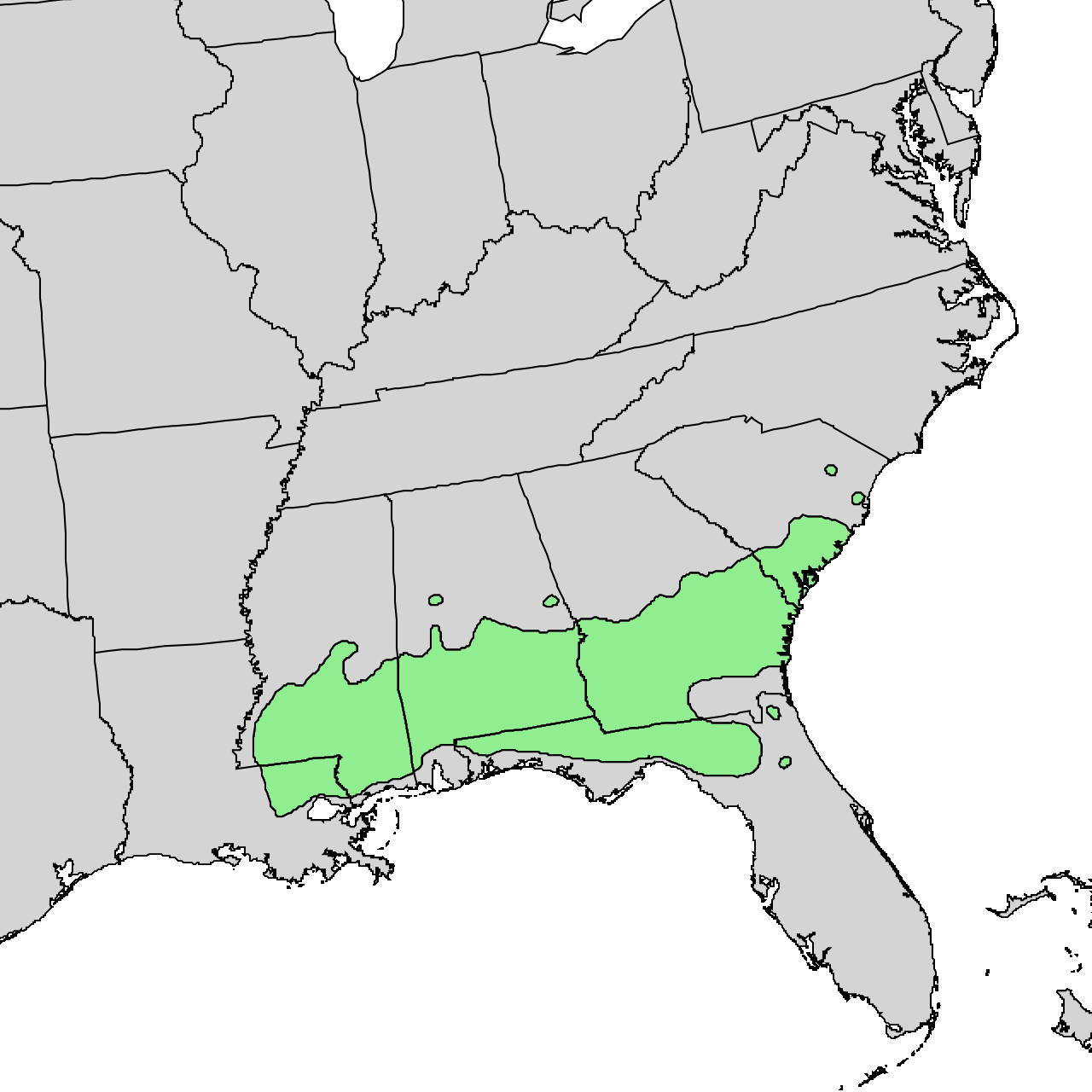
- Natural range of Pinus glabra

= Pinus glabra =

Spruce pine

Species of conifer

Pinus glabra, the spruce pine, is a species of conifer in the family Pinaceae, a pine tree native to the coastal plains of the southern United States, from southern South Carolina south to northern Florida and west to southern Louisiana.

== Description ==
This pine is a straight-growing, medium-sized species, attaining heights of 20 to 40 metres (66 to 131 ft). The leaves are needle-like, in bundles of two, 5-to-8-centimetre-long (2.0 to 3.1 in), slender (1-millimetre-thick (0.039 in)), and glossy dark green. The small, slender cones are 4-to-6-centimetre-long (1.6 to 2.4 in), with weak prickles on the scales that are soon shed.

== Ecology ==
Pinus glabra differs markedly from most other pines in that it does not occur in largely pure pine forests, but is typically found as scattered trees in moist woodland habitats in mixed hardwood forest. To be able to compete successfully in such habitats, it has adapted to greater shade tolerance than most other pines.

== Gallery ==
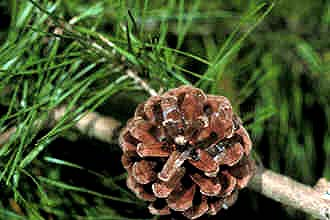
Pinus glabra foliage and cone

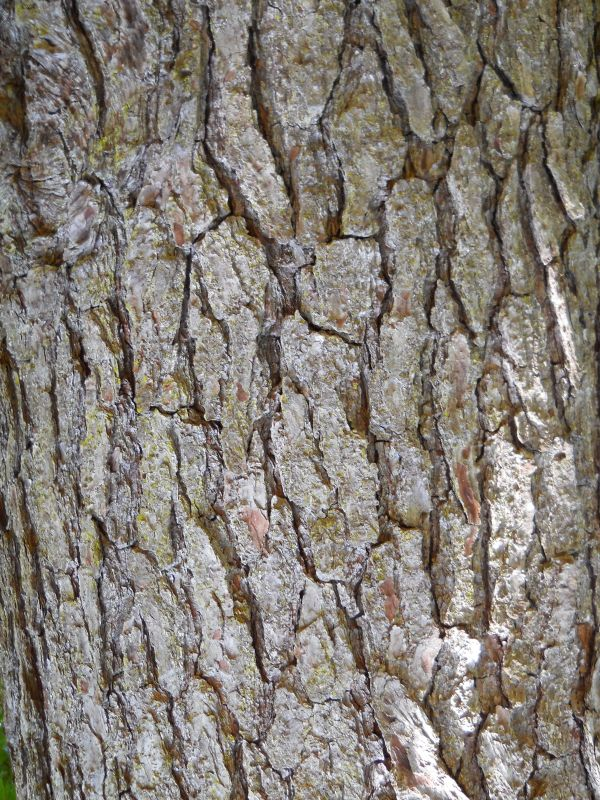
Bark of mature Pinus glabra

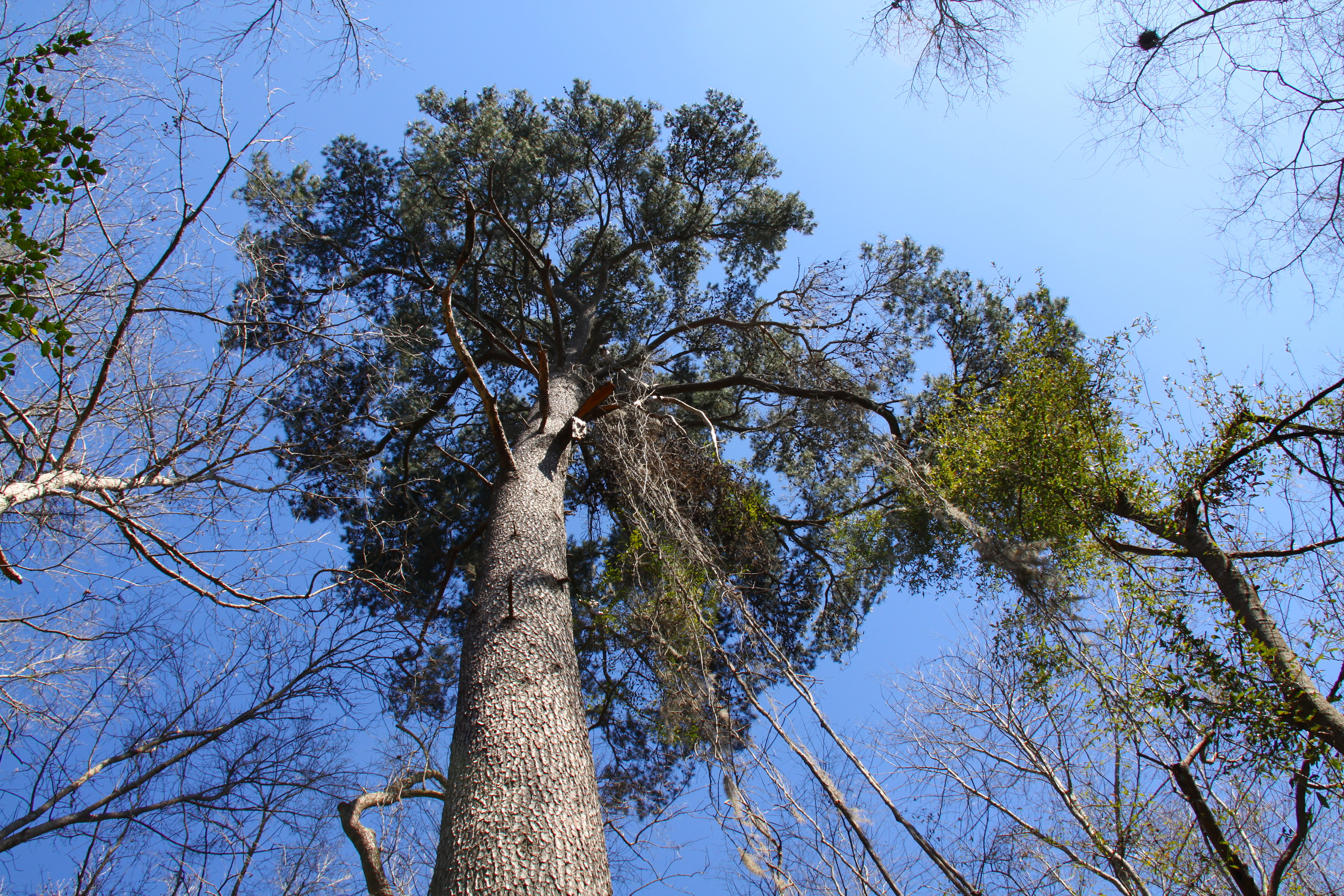
Crown of mature Pinus glabra
