= Pine tar =

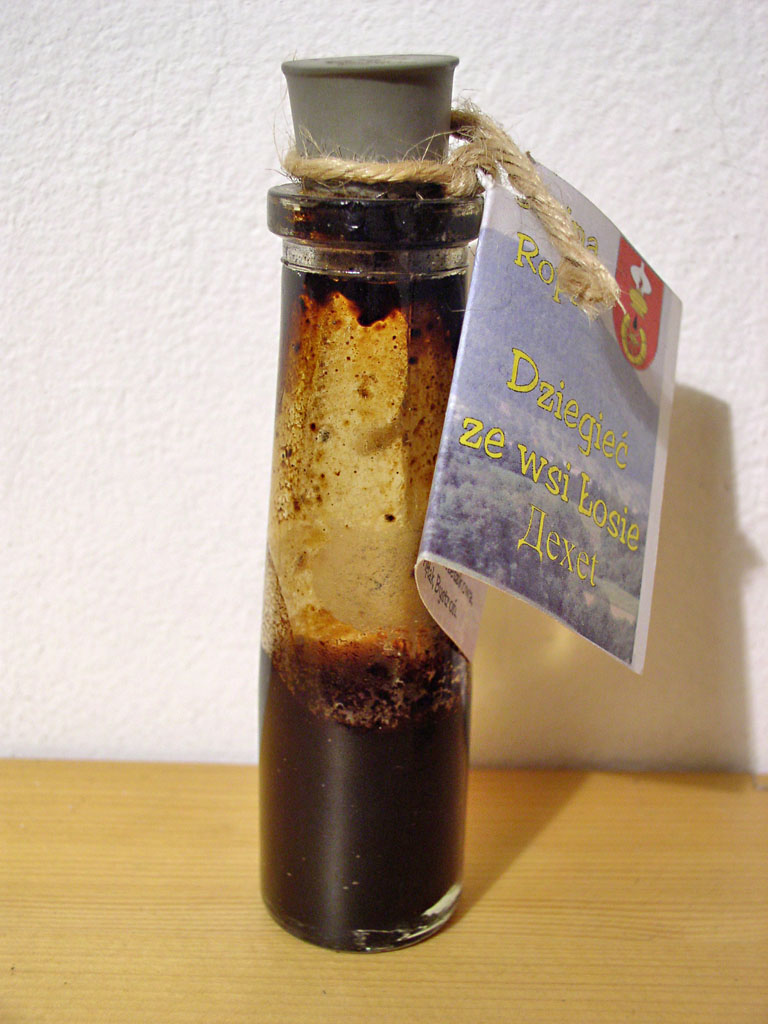

Names
- Other names Pine tar oil, Wood tar oil

Identifiers
CAS Number	8011-48-1
ChemSpider	none
ECHA InfoCard	100.029.429
EC Number	232-374-8
KEGG	D04807
PubChem CID	17398176
UNII	YFH4WC535J
CompTox Dashboard (EPA)	DTXSID60897317

Properties
Appearance	Blackish-brown viscous liquid
Density	1.01–1.06
Boiling point	150 to 400 °C (302 to 752 °F; 423 to 673 K)
Solubility in water	Slightly
Solubility	alc, chloroform, ether, acetone, glacial acetic acid, fixed/volatile oils, solutions of caustic alkalies

Pharmacology
Routes of administration	Topical

Hazards
- GHS labelling
Pictograms	(GHS07: Exclamation mark)
Signal word	Warning
Hazard statements	H317, H412
NFPA 704 (fire diamond)	1 0 0
Flash point	90 °C (194 °F; 363 K)
- Except where otherwise noted, data are given for materials in their standard state (at 25 °C [77 °F], 100 kPa). Infobox references

Pine tar is a form of wood tar produced by the high temperature carbonization of pine wood in anoxic conditions (dry distillation or destructive distillation). The wood is rapidly decomposed by applying heat and pressure in a closed container; the primary resulting products are charcoal and pine tar.

Pine tar consists primarily of aromatic hydrocarbons, tar acids, and tar bases. Components of tar vary according to the pyrolytic process (e.g. method, duration, temperature) and origin of the wood (e.g. age of pine trees, type of soil, and moisture conditions during tree growth). The choice of wood, design of kiln, burning, and collection of the tar can vary. Pine stumps and roots are used in the traditional production of pine tar.

Pine tar has a long history as a wood preservative, as a wood sealant for maritime use, in roofing construction and maintenance, in soaps, and in the treatment of carbuncles and skin diseases, such as psoriasis, eczema, and rosacea. It is used in baseball to enhance the grip of a hitter's bat; it is also sometimes used by pitchers to improve their grip on the ball, in violation of the rules.

== History ==
=== Nordic Iron Age ===
Based on chemical analysis of organic residues, there are strong indications that cone-shaped pits discovered north of Uppsala, Sweden, have been used for pine tar production. Three of the pits have been radiocarbon dated. The oldest dates back to 540–380 BCE, which would make it the world's oldest known, still existing tar production facility. The other dates from 230–390 CE.

=== Classical antiquity ===
In his encyclopedic work Natural History (Latin: Naturalis Historia) the Roman naturalist and author Pliny the Elder (23/24–79 CE) describes how, in Europe, tar is produced through the destructive distillation of pine wood. The wood was chopped into small pieces (billets) and heated in a furnace. The tar was used "for coating ships and for many other useful purposes."

=== 17th century ===
==== Finland ====
Pine tar has long been used in Nordic nations as a preservative for wood which may be exposed to harsh conditions, including outdoor furniture and ship decking and rigging. Tar demand surged in the 17th century as European nations began constructing naval and merchant fleets that required tar and pitch for ship waterproofing and caulking. In Finland, then a part of Sweden, large-scale tar production began in the early 17th century. By the late 17th century, tar was Sweden's third most valuable export commodity.

==== North American colonies ====
Tar and pitch for maritime use was in such demand that it became an important export for the American colonies, which had extensive pine forests. North Carolinians became known as "Tar Heels."

=== 18th–19th century ===
==== Sweden ====
In present-day Sweden, large-scale tar production started around 1700. Swedish pine tar was often called "Stockholm tar" since, for many years, a single company held a royal monopoly on its export out of Stockholm, Sweden. It was also known as "Archangel Tar". Stockholm tar became synonymous with top-quality tar. Tar production peaked around the mid-1850s and gradually declined thereafter, largely due to new shipbuilding materials reducing the need for tar as a waterproofing agent, and to the decreasing use of hemp rope as sailing ships were phased out. Stockholm tar and pine tar are chemically the same and are not different substances.

== Chemical composition ==
32 compounds have been identified in pine tar derived from Pinus nigra, accounting for 95.5% of the total composition. Their respective percentages are:

- Methyl dehydroabietate: 22.44%
- Dehydroabietic acid: 14.59%
- Retene (7-isopropyl-1-methylphenanthrene): 10.08%
- Isopimaral: 6.18%
- Pimaral: 4.71%
- Abietic acid: 4.23%
- Pimaric acid: 3.59%
- 18-Norabieta-8,11,13-triene: 3.50%
- 2,3,5-Trimethylphenanthrene: 1.72%
- Levoglucosan: 1.44%

These compounds primarily consist of resin acids and their derivatives, along with phenanthrene-based hydrocarbons. Such constituents contribute to pine tar's characteristic properties, including its antiseptic and preservative qualities.

== Uses ==
Pine tar was used as a preservative on the bottoms of traditional Nordic-style skis until modern synthetic materials replaced wood in their construction. It also helped waxes adhere, which aided such skis’ grip and glide.

Pine tar is widely used as a veterinary care product, particularly as an antiseptic and hoof care treatment for horses and cattle. It also has been used when chickens start pecking the low hen. Applying a smear of pine tar on the hens' wound acts as a natural germicidal/antibacterial agent that discourages continued attacks on the affected hen due to its foreign texture.

Pine tar is used as a softening solvent in the rubber industry, for treating and fabricating construction materials, and in special paints.

=== As a preservative and sealant in wooden boats ===
Pine tar is combined with gum turpentine and boiled linseed oil to preserve and seal the hulls of wooden boats. First, a thin coat is applied to the hull using a mixture with a greater proportion of turpentine. This allows it to permeate deeper into the oakum and fibre of the wood and lets the tar seep into any pinholes and larger gaps that might be in the planks. When applied to the interior of the hull, the tar weeps out to the exterior and indicates where the boat needs the most attention. This is followed with a thicker standard mix. Such treatments, while effective, must be continually reapplied.

=== Weatherproofing rope ===
Traditionally, hemp and other natural fibers were the norm for rope production. Such rope would quickly rot when exposed to rain, and was typically tarred to preserve it. The tar would stain the hands of ship's crews, and British Navy seamen became known as "tars."

=== Baseball ===
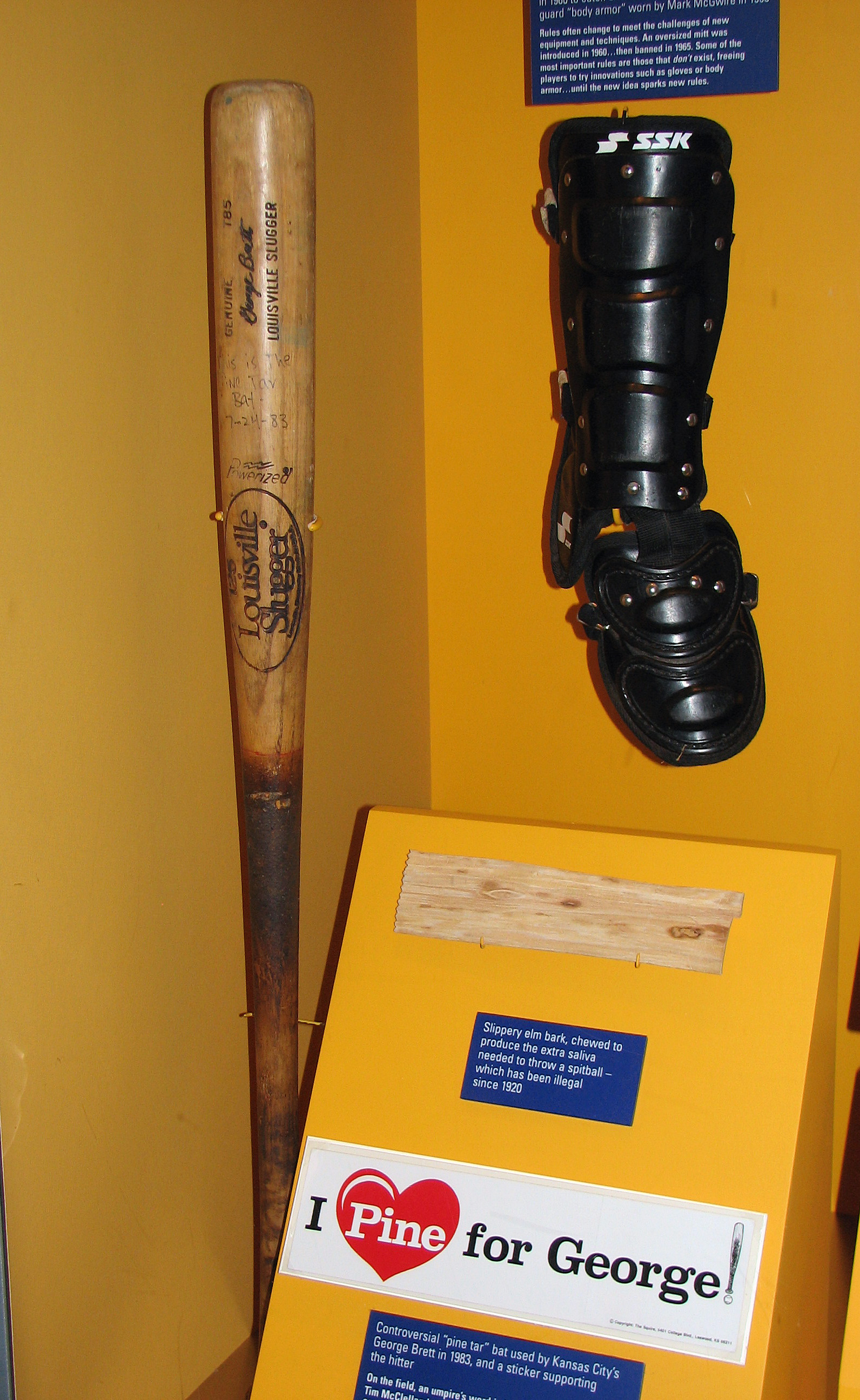
George Brett's pine tar bat at left, from a 2006 exhibit at The Henry Ford in Dearborn, Michigan

Pine tar is occasionally applied to the handles of baseball bats to improve a batter's grip. Batters may apply pine tar to their gloves to improve tackiness, and sometimes apply tar to their helmets where the tar can be touched to a glove for improving the bat grip. In the 21st century, pine tar is supplied as a firm stick in a small container for rubbing over the bat handle, which is then smoothed with a rag.

Rule 1.10(c) of the 2002 Official rules of Major League Baseball restricts application to the lower 18 in (46 cm) of a bat. The most famous example of the rule being broken is the Pine Tar Incident, which occurred in the July 24, 1983 game between the Kansas City Royals and New York Yankees. In the ninth inning, Royals third baseman George Brett hit a go-ahead home run using a bat that was discovered to have an amount of pine tar on its surface beyond what the rules allowed. This resulted in the home run being nullified and the Royals protesting the game (video).

In the past, pine tar was sometimes used by pitchers to improve their grip on the ball and enhance ability to spin the ball. This is now illegal in the game due to a regulation prohibiting the application of any foreign substance to a ball. According to Rule 3.01 (3.02), "No player shall intentionally discolor or damage the ball by rubbing it with soil, rosin, paraffin, licorice, sand-paper, emery-paper or other foreign substances (such as pine tar)."

=== Medical ===
Pine tar has historically been used for treating skin conditions, usually as an additive in cold process solid soap or lotions. Due to the high presence of phenol in the early manufacturing of pine tar, it was deemed carcinogenic. However, now much of the phenol has been removed. Pine tar was banned by the FDA along with many other ingredients categorized as over the counter drugs, due to a lack of evidence of safety and effectiveness for the specific uses named. However, clinical tests in Australia in 2017 demonstrated that the greatest risk comes from acute sensitivity for those with severe dermatological conditions, and if it comes in contact with the eyes. The number of positive reactions for wood tars was not significantly greater than those for other common allergens. In addition, the concentration of pine tar in topical products available in Australia is up to 2.3%, which is up to four times less than that tested in these studies.

Pine tar has been used to cover peck wounds in captive bird flocks such as chickens, to prevent continued pecking on a wound and cannibalism. Pine tar is also used in veterinary medicine as an expectorant and an antiseptic in chronic skin conditions.

== In popular culture ==
In the television series Ten Pound Poms, depicting immigration from Britain to Australia in the 1950's, a newly betrothed young British man uses pine tar to lighten the skin of his British fiancee's illegitimate mixed-race baby, so that he may pass off the baby as his own (series 2, episode 2).

== See also ==
- Coal tar
- Creosote
- Tarpaulin
- Tarring and feathering (punishment)
