= Ferruginol =

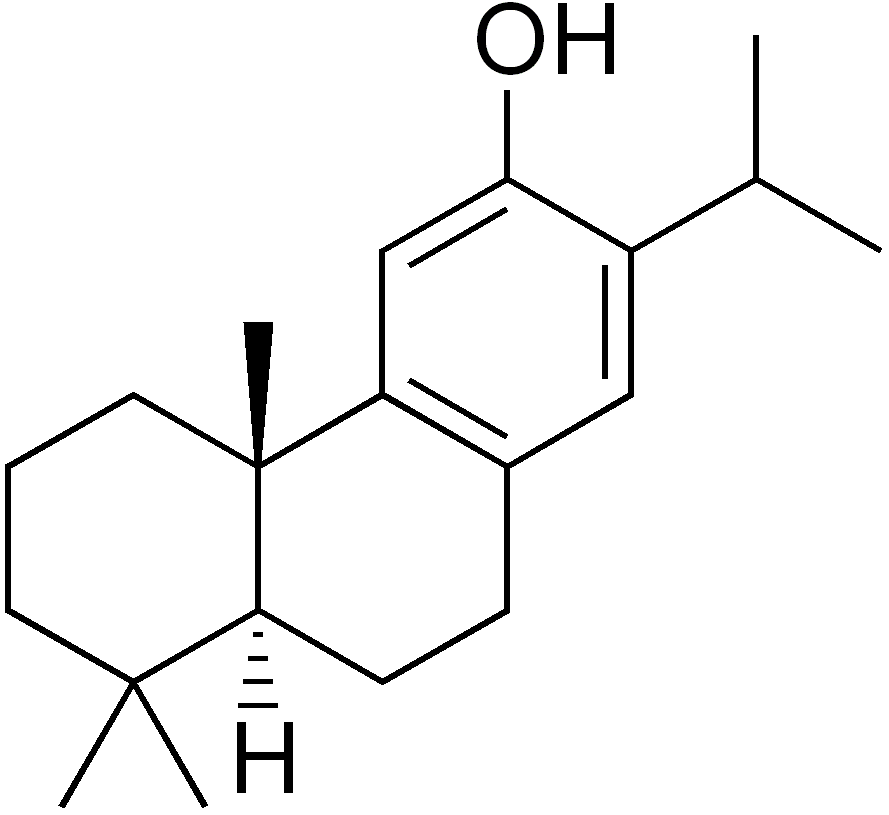

Names
- IUPAC name Abieta-8,11,13-trien-12-ol
- Systematic IUPAC name (4bS,8aS)-4b,8,8-Trimethyl-2-(propan-2-yl)-4b,5,6,7,8,8a,9,10-octahydrophenanthren-3-ol

Identifiers
CAS Number	514-62-5
3D model (JSmol)	Interactive image
ChEBI	CHEBI:78274
ChEMBL	ChEMBL197308
ChemSpider	390582
PubChem CID	442027
UNII	N2CMM6X37M
CompTox Dashboard (EPA)	DTXSID20331722
- InChI: InChI=1S/C20H30O/c1-13(2)15-11-14-7-8-18-19(3,4)9-6-10-20(18,5)16(14)12-17(15)21/h11-13,18,21H,6-10H2,1-5H3/t18-,20+/m0/s1 Key: QXNWVJOHUAQHLM-AZUAARDMSA-N; InChI=1/C20H30O/c1-13(2)15-11-14-7-8-18-19(3,4)9-6-10-20(18,5)16(14)12-17(15)21/h11-13,18,21H,6-10H2,1-5H3/t18-,20+/m0/s1 Key: QXNWVJOHUAQHLM-AZUAARDMBU
- SMILES: Oc1c(cc2c(c1)[C@]3(CCCC([C@@H]3CC2)(C)C)C)C(C)C

Properties
Chemical formula	C_{20}H_{30}O
Molar mass	286.459 g·mol^{−1}
Density	1.0±0.1 g/cm^{3}
Melting point	56-57 °C
- Except where otherwise noted, data are given for materials in their standard state (at 25 °C [77 °F], 100 kPa). verify (what is ?) Infobox references

Ferruginol is a natural phenol with a terpenoid substructure. Specifically, it is a diterpene of the abietane chemical class, meaning it is characterized by three fused six-membered rings and alkyl functional groups. Ferruginol was first identified in 1939 by Brandt and Neubauer as the main component in the resin of the miro tree (Podocarpus ferrugneus) and has since been isolated from other conifer species in the families Cupressaceae and Podocarpaceae. As a biomarker, the presence of ferruginol in fossils, mainly resin, is used to describe the density of these conifers in that particular biosphere throughout time.

== Background ==
Ferruginol is a phenolic abietene, a type of tricyclic diterpenoid derived from terrestrial plants. It has a molecular composition of C_{20}H_{30}O with a molecular weight of 286 g/mole. Along with its presence in the Verbenaceae family, it has been found in a variety of conifer families including Podocarpaceae, the ancient Araucariaceae, and the extinct Cheirolepidiaceae. It is particularly useful as a biomarker because of its concentration in the Cupressaceae family. In these conifers, it acts as a plant metabolite, along with some protective and antibacterial roles.

== Preservation ==
As a polar terpenoid, ferruginol was thought to have poor preservation potential. However, the discovery of resin fossils provided unaltered natural diterpenoids that can be used to understand botanical diversity during a given geological age. Analysis of macrofossils or clay sediments is also used to identify the presence of ferruginol, though these samples may not be fully preserved. Comparing the composition of fossilized coal or clay from the same region as resin fossils can indicate the original biological precursors of these samples. Additionally, the diagenetic alterations of fossils can be used to understand the environmental changes in the time after they were formed. General abietane diterpenoid abietic acids have been connected to the diagenetic products simonellite and retene. Microbial and abiotic degradation make it so most conifer biomarkers cannot be linked to specific species, so it is especially useful to find resinous samples that are able to provide more detailed identification.

Due to the improved preservation of ferruginol and other diterpenoids in fossil resin, they have been found to be underrepresented in sediment samples when compared to angiosperms, whose leaf waxes are more free to disperse throughout the sample. Even in regions known to have a high abundance of conifers, sediment samples have been found to contain little to no unaltered diterpenoids. The relative of abundance of conifers cannot therefore be directly determined from biomarker concentrations in sediment samples, as this will be biased by preservation.

The presence of ferruginol has also been used in more modern samples as biological tracers. For example, analyzing the honeybee product propolis helps establish the main botanical source collected by the bees.

== Measurement ==
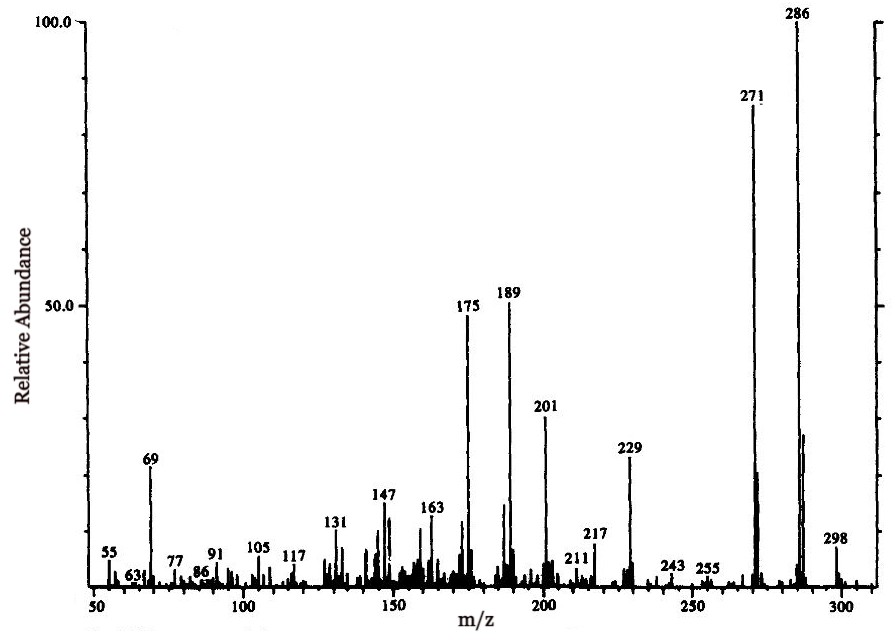
Mass spectrum of ferruginol, isolated from Taxodium samples. Figure modified from.

The sample preparation to measure ferruginol abundance varies depending on form the sample initially takes, though generally follows the same structure. After physically crushing the sample, N,O-bistrifluoroacetamide (BSTFA) is used to transform molecules into trimethyl-silyl (TMS) derivatives. It is then chemically extracted into neutral, aromatic, and polar fractions using specified eluents, often hexane, dichloromethane, and methanol, respectively. The aromatic fractions are then analyzed using gas chromatography–mass spectrometry (GC-MS), and library data along with fragmentation patterns are used to identify the molecular makeup of each notable peak and their relative concentration in the sample. Ferruginol can be identified with a molecular weight of 286 m/z.

Along with GC-MS, ferruginol has also been analyzed using cross polarization/magic angle spinning nuclear magnetic resonance (3C-CPMAS-NMR) to provide more detailed analysis. Additionally, time-of-flight secondary ion mass spectrometry (TOF-SIMS) has been used in combination with GC-MS with samples collected from still living organisms for surface imaging and depth profiling.

== Bioactivity ==
Research published in 2005 found that this and other compounds of the class from Sequoia have in vitro anti-tumor and anti-inflammatory properties in cell lines. In vitro studies have shown human colon, breast, and lung tumor reduction and reduction in oncogene transformed cells as well. Ferruginol has also been found to have antibacterial activity and gastroprotective effects.

When studied against human prostate cancer cells, ferruginol induced cell death by suppressing survival signaling pathways. Specific activity of tumor growth inhibition (GI) is 2-5 micrograms/milliliter. Beyond anti-cancer activity, studies with mice showed that ferruginol had anti-inflammatory properties against induced ulcerative colitis and acted as a gastroprotective agent against gastro lesions.

== Biomarker case study: Brazil ==
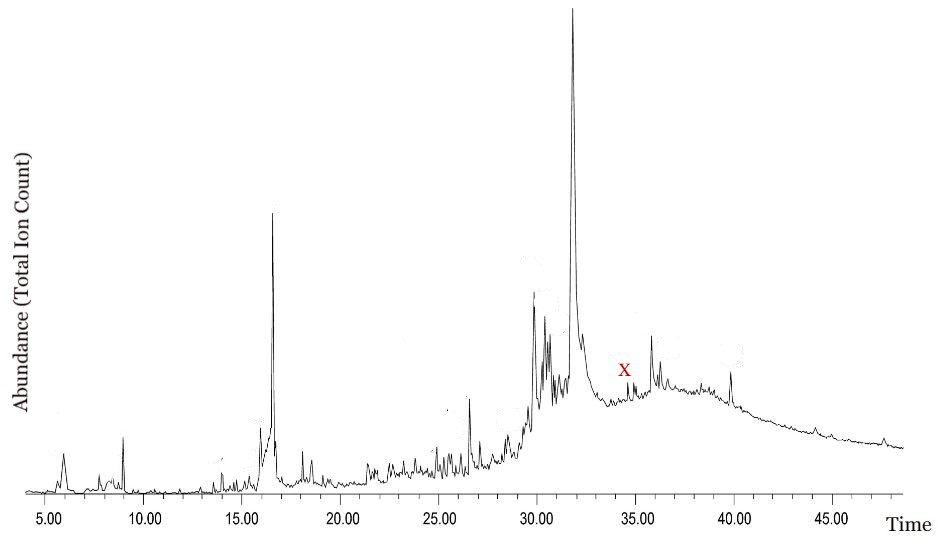
Total ion chromatogram of amber sample from Ipubi Formation. The ferruginol peak is marked with a red X. Modified from.

The Araripe Basin in Brazil is well known for the diverse and well-preserved collection of fossils. Despite this, the Ipubi Formation in the central Santana Group is only poorly explored. To better understand the paleoflora, researchers at Universidade Federal Rural de Pernambuco analyzed amber resin from the black shales that make up the collection site. Palynological content had been used to date the Ipubi Formation as Aptian-Albian (125–100.5 mya), and the amber samples were thought to be allochthonous, having swept in from nearby conifer sources. GC-MS analysis resulted in the chromatogram shown to the right, with the ferruginol peak marked in red. Additionally, 3C-CPMAS-NMR was used to further understand the sample. The terpenoids analyzed were separated into three groups: monoterpenes, sesquiterpenoids, and diterpenoids. Diterpenoids of the abietanic class were the most abundant in the amber, though they are widely present in all conifer families and therefore less useful in identifying specific contributing species. The detection of ferruginol helped limit the biological origin to the families Cupressaceae, Podocarpaceae and Cheirolepidiaceae. Further more, the absence callitrisates, kauranes and phyllocladanes excluded Cupressaceae as the source. Therefore, the possible botanical sources of the amber collected in the Ipubi Formation were identified as Podocarpaceae and Cheirolepidiaceae. The results from the amber samples are consistent with environmental conditions determined from a separate analysis of the bituminous shale.
