= Sugiol =

Names
- IUPAC name (4aS,10aS)-6-Hydroxy-1,1,4a-trimethyl-7-propan-2-yl-3,4,10,10a-tetrahydro-2H-phenanthren-9-one

Identifiers
CAS Number	511-05-7
3D model (JSmol)	Interactive image
ChEBI	CHEBI:138961
ChEMBL	ChEMBL195296
ChemSpider	84979
KEGG	C21822
PubChem CID	94162
CompTox Dashboard (EPA)	DTXSID70965374
- InChI: InChI=1S/C20H28O2/c1-12(2)13-9-14-15(10-16(13)21)20(5)8-6-7-19(3,4)18(20)11-17(14)22/h9-10,12,18,21H,6-8,11H2,1-5H3/t18-,20+/m0/s1 Key: IPEHJNRNYPOFII-AZUAARDMSA-N
- SMILES: CC(C)C1=C(C=C2C(=C1)C(=O)C[C@@H]3[C@@]2(CCCC3(C)C)C)O

Properties
Chemical formula	C_{20}H_{28}O_{2}
Molar mass	300.442 g·mol^{−1}
- Except where otherwise noted, data are given for materials in their standard state (at 25 °C [77 °F], 100 kPa). Infobox references

Sugiol is a phenolic abietane derivative of ferruginol and can be used as a biomarker for specific families of conifers. The presence of sugiol can be used to identify the Cupressaceae s.1., podocarpaceae, and Araucaraiaceae families of conifers. The polar terpenoids are among the most resistant molecules to degradation besides n-alkanes and fatty acids, affording them high viability as biomarkers due to their longevity in the sedimentary record. Significant amounts of sugiol has been detected in fossil wood dated to the Eocene and Miocene periods, as well as a sample of Protopodocarpoxylon dated to the middle Jurassic.

== Background ==
Sugiol is a naturally occurring phenolic diterpenoid. Diterpenoids are a group of secondary metabolites with 20 carbons. Acyclic diterpenes are uncommon, due to the way that they are assembled, and include important molecules such as phytol. Sugiol has three six-membered rings, one of which is aromatic (ring C), and differs from ferruginol only by an addition of an oxo group bound to ring B. It may also be classified as an abietane, a class of tricyclic diterpenoids that share the same basic structure and are commonly found in the resin of conifers among other terrestrial plants.

Aromatic abietanes that contain an aromatic carbon ring, such as sugiol and ferruginol, have exhibited a variety of interesting properties that have made them of high interest to the pharmacological community. Sugiol specifically has demonstrated anti-tumor, anti-microbial, antioxidant, and anti-viral activities.

Sugiol has been shown to inhibit the oncogenic protein STAT3, which is constituently on in malignant tumors. Sugiol directly inhibits the enzyme transketolase, leading to a build up of reactive oxygen species (ROS) and stress-induced cell death. Reactive oxygen species are highly reactive, and can damage cellular mechanisms by oxidizing critical molecules.

Sugiol downregulates inflammatory genes such as NF-κB, COX-2, TNF-alpha, IL-1beta, and IL-6.

Sugiol prevents virus triggered cytopathic effects as a result of H1N1 in MDCK cells for up to 72 hours. It has also been shown to possess significant neutralizing activity against gram-positive and gram-negative bacteria, with slightly higher activity against gram-positive organisms.

Many plant derived compounds have demonstrated potential as therapeutic tools. In one study sugiol showed efficacy in treating Leishmania infantum, a parasite that can cause Leishmaniasis in humans. Free sugiol was able to induce cell-death in the parasitic bacteria, and when encased in cell walls obtained from yeast was able to enter a parasitized macrophage and inhibit the L. infantum within.

Because sugiol has shown so many protective effects in therapeutic trials, it is likely that in plants it acts as a chemical defense agent. Sugiol present in the resins of conifers may help to protect the plant against ROS generated during metabolism, as well as against any pathogenic viruses or bacteria.

=== Reaction pathways ===
Diterpenes are commonly synthesized from the precursor molecule geranylgeranyl pyrophosphate (GGPP). GGPP's hydrocarbon backbone can be rearranged into different structures that may be further rearranged or added to in order to create precursors for different families of diterpenoid compounds. This precursor molecule may be synthesized through the mevalonic acid pathway or the deoxyxylulose pathway. These pathways produce isopentenyl pyrophosphate, which can be rearranged into GGPP. The cyclization of GGPP and the subsequent reorganizations into different precursors is controlled by a large family of enzymes known as diterpene syntheses (diTPS).

To synthesize sugiol a plant must first synthesize GGPP through either of the previously mentioned pathways, (mevalonic acid or the deoxyxylulose pathway), then rearrange GGPP into the molecule mitiradiene. After formation of an intermediate compound abietatriene, a cytochrome P450 enzyme can then attach an oxygen molecule to the intermediate. This produces ferruginol, which can then be modified to sugiol by sugiol synthase.

Sugiol may then be formed through the modification of ferruginol according to the following reaction driven by the enzyme sugiol synthase.

Ferruginol + 2 O_{2} + 2 NADPH → 2 H^{+} + 3 H_{2}O + 2 NADP^{+} + Sugiol

=== Plant sources ===
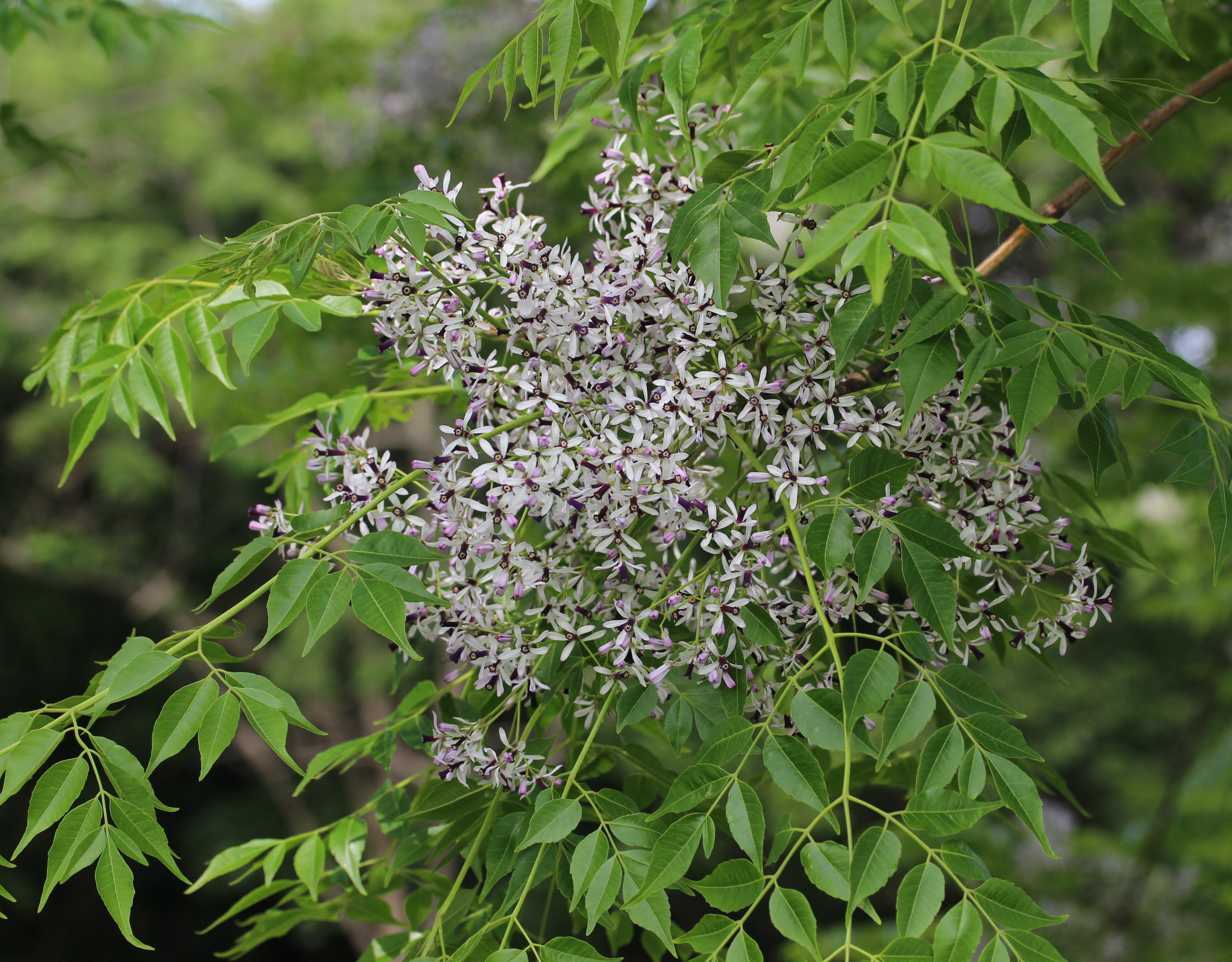
Melia azedarach flowers, of the family meliaceae. Low levels of Sugiol has been detected in this family of angiosperms.

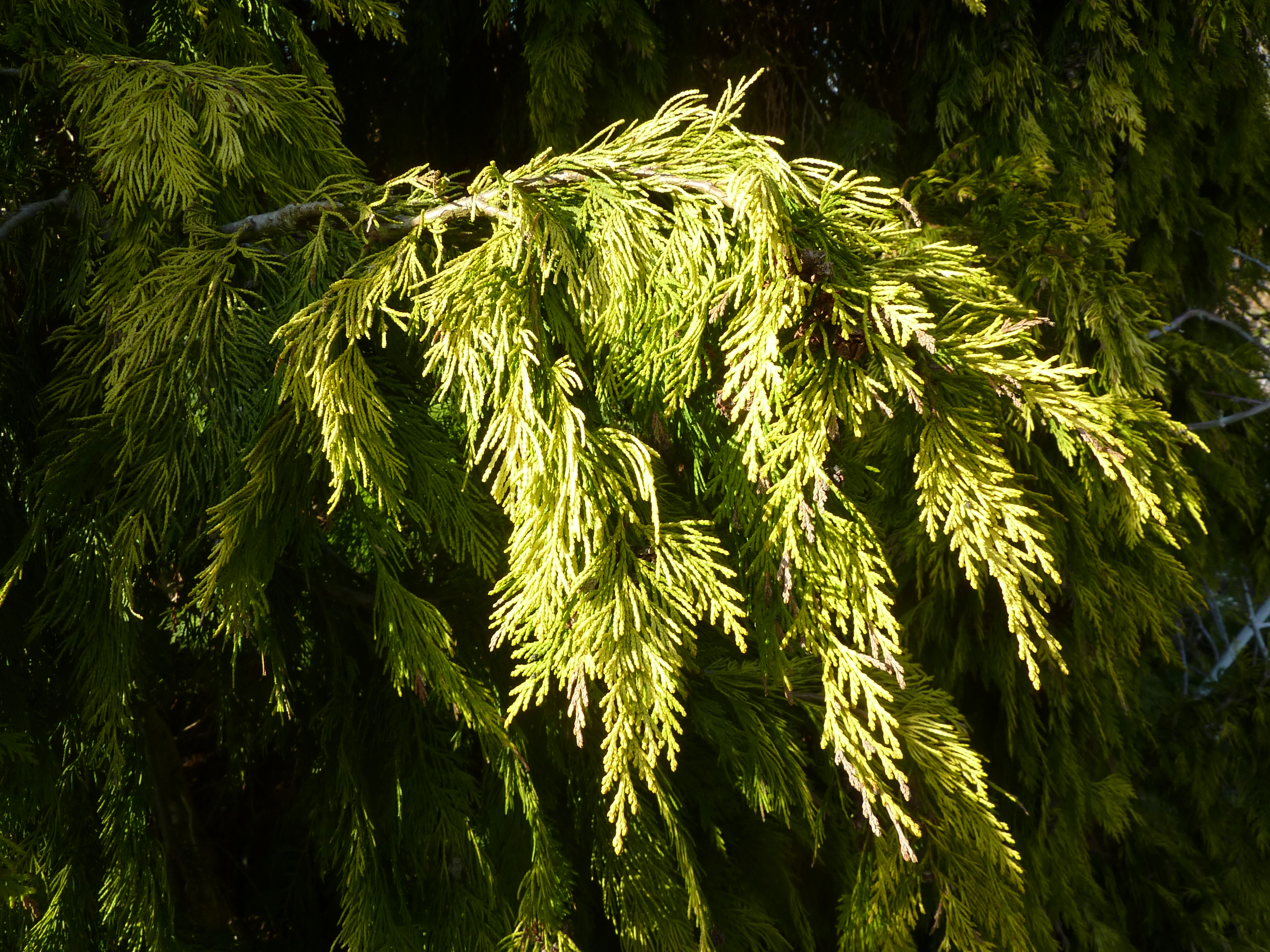
Chamaecyparis lawsonia, a conifer species in the family Cupressaceae. This family has been observed to contain sugiol

Abietanes may fall into one of two classes, either regular or phenolic. Regular abietanes are common across all conifers, whereas phenolic abietanes are usually found in more specific families and are mostly absent from pinaceae. There are a few exceptions to this, including detection of ferruginol and its derivative in Cedrus atlantica and Pinus sylvestris.

Sugiol has been detected in Cupressaceae, Taxodiaceae, Podocarpaceae, and many other conifer families. It has not been significantly detected in Pinaceae. Similar phenolic abietanes have also been detected in cedars (genus Cedrus), pines (genus Pinus), monkey puzzle (genus Araucaria), and torreya (genus Torreya). Sugiol has also been detected in certain angiosperm genera such as Inula and Melia, but is much more prevalent in conifers. This allows for these organisms to be excluded from the list of species for which sugiol is a biomarker. The enzyme sugiol synthase has also been isolated from Salvia militiorrhiza, an angiosperm that contains high levels of phenolic diterpenes and is commonly utilized in traditional Chinese medicine.

== Preservation ==
Organic compounds originally in living organisms can be preserved in the rock record if certain requirements are met. Proper preservation requires ample supply of organic material, high burial of that organic matter, and that the organic matter is then polymerized and not degraded. The more degraded a biomolecule is the less specific of a biomarker it becomes, as multiple molecules may have the same hydrocarbon skeleton after diagenesis. However, polar terpenoids such as sugiol may be preserved in their unaltered forms in fossil conifers, potentially due to plant resins that protect them from degradation.

In samples obtained from a Pliocene fossilized forest most molecules had been significantly degraded, but phenolic abietanes including sugiol remained intact and identifiable. Even in samples that had been approximately 37.7% decomposed as determined by comparing cellulose content, trace amounts of sugiol and more than 10% ferruginol were detected via GC/MS. Sugiol will remain detectable in a sample long after it has lost its anatomical identifiers, making it extremely useful in identifying extremely old or decomposed plant fossils.

In a study of preserved fossil wood and buried samples from a middle Jurassic forest located in Poland, a negative correlation was observed between the preservation of anatomical features of the plant samples versus the chemical features. It was hypothesized that the rapid mineralization processes required to preserve biomolecules degraded the organic matter, but either extracted or trapped chemical biomarkers in the clay mineral matrix during the early stages of mineralization, protecting those molecules from breakdown. Burial of samples in anaerobic sediments decreased biodegradation and increased preservation of biomarkers including sugiol. Sugiol was significantly more abundant in less oxidized samples. Additionally, the antimicrobial properties of sugiol could help to decelerate biodegradation of itself and other natural products by decreasing microbe driven breakdown.

== Measurement techniques ==
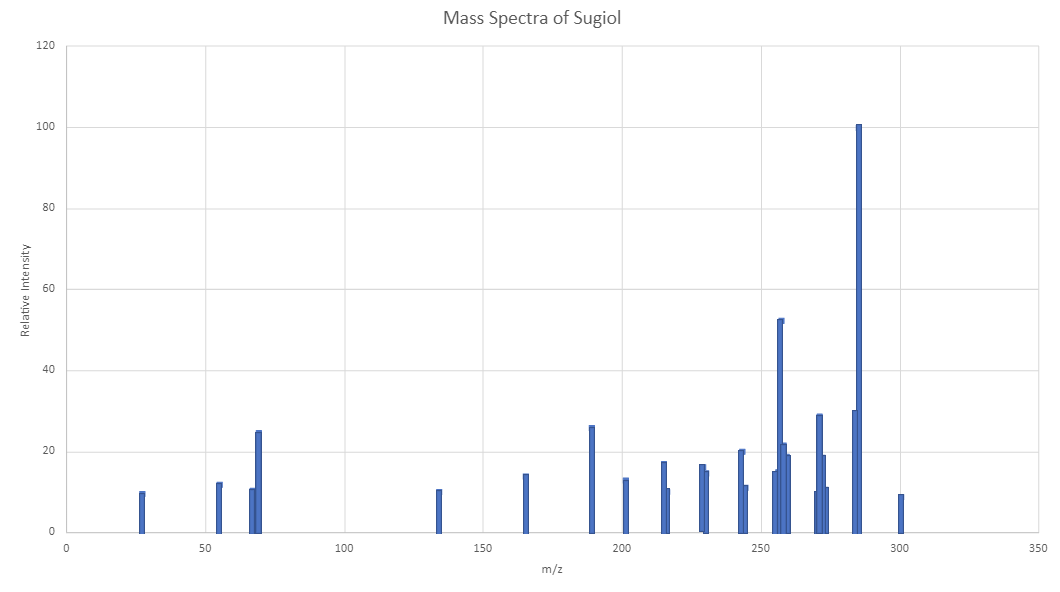
A graphical recreation of the mass spectra of sugiol. Originally obtained from a gas chromatography column and single quadrupole mass spectrometer in positive ionization mode, with an ionization energy of 70 eV and a mass resolution of 0.0001 Da.

=== Gas chromatography/mass spectroscopy ===
Gas chromatography (GC) and mass spectrometry (MS) are commonly used to detect and identify sugiol in a sample. GC/MS is highly specific and sensitive and allows for identification of a wide range of analytes. After extraction from the original sample, which could be the resin of a living plant, or a preserved rock sample, the sample can be ionized and the components identified through their representative spectra. Analysis of fragmentation patterns can also be used to identify a compound by connecting each peak in the mass spectra to the masses of significant fragmentation products of the molecule, as well as the molecular ion, which is the largest significant peak in the spectra.

When identifying sugiol in a sample, full-scan monitoring is commonly used to scan the full range of masses from 50 to 650 Da. This allows for detection of compounds with a wide range of molecular masses when attempting to make an identification based on chemical composition. Electron impact ionization is also commonly used to break apart and ionize the samples before they are passed to the mass spectrometer.

The molecular ion peak for sugiol appears as a small peak at an m/z ratio of 300.2084. The largest peak in the mass spectra appears at a m/z ratio of 285.1849, and corresponds to a fragmentation product with a formula of C_{19}H_{25}O_{2}. This fragmentation product has one less ring and an H_{2}O molecule bound to the newly open carbon chain. Another significant peak is at m/z 257.1536, and corresponds to another fragmentation product with a single ring, and a formula of C_{17}H_{21}O_{2}. Further significant peaks appear at m/z's of 217 and 243, corresponding to formulas of C_{13}H_{15}O_{2} and C_{15}H_{19}O_{2}, respectively.

=== Derivitization ===
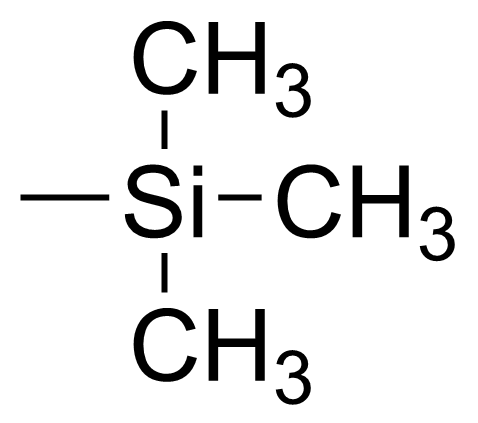
Trimethylsilyl functional group used in derivitization reactions for GC/MS sample preparation.

Sugiol is a protic molecule. Protic molecules are those that have protic groups or hydrogen molecules that readily leave the molecule, such as -OH, -NH, and -HF. These molecules can complicate GC/MS data by increasing peak tailing and affecting the ease with which they can be separated by the GC. In order to avoid this effect, protic molecules are often subjected to derivatization reactions, in which the offending protons are replaced by a different functional group. A commonly used replacement group is trimethylsilyl (TMS), which produces trimethylsilyl derivatives of the original protic molecules. Another commonly used group is tert-butyldimethylsilyl (TBDMS), also used to derivatize hydroxyl and amine protic groups. Diazomethane has also been used to form methyl esters from carboxylic acids.

== Case studies ==
The combination of the longevity of sugiol in environmental samples and its presence in only specific families of plants make it an excellent biomarker. Detection of sugiol in combination with other biomarkers like ferruginol or other diterpenes can also help to bolster the identification of the sample, as well as to narrow the scope of possible identities to only a few specific conifer families. Sugiol has been utilized in the identification of extinct plant taxa such as Protopodocarpoxylon, and Taxodioxylori gypsaceum.

=== Identification of Protopodocarpoxylon ===
Protopodocarpoxylon is an extinct genus of conifer tracheophytes, now often found as fossilized woods. In a 2007 study, extraction and identification of biomarkers from fossil woods collected in south-central Poland allowed for the identification of the sample as Protopodocarpoxylon Eckhold. Samples of the wood were collected from clays and carbonate concretions then cleaned of contaminants before being pulverized, and the organics extracted. The extracts were derivatized with TMS and then subjected to gas chromatography-mass spectrometry (GC-MS) analysis.

Multiple abietanes were detected in the analyzed samples, with ferruginol, sugiol, simonellite, and dehydroabietane present in all four of the samples tested. Sugiol and ferruginol were both detected as unaltered natural products. There was a dramatic difference in detected abundance of sugiol and ferruginol in samples that were more oxidized, but the biomarkers were still detectable in both cases.

The unknown fossil wood samples were determined to contain aliphatic lipids (n-alkanols and n-alkanoic acids), diterpenoids (abietanes, labdanes, and totaranes), triterpenoids (lupane and hopane), and steroids. The presence of long chain n-alkanes, ferruginol, sugiol, and dehydroabietic acid were considered and the sample was determined to be a conifer plant, in either the Podocarpaceae, Cupressaceae, or Araucariaceae family. All of these chemical identifiers, combined with distinct morphological features characteristic of tracheids allowed for the assignment of Protopodocarpoxylon to the sample.

The presence of multiple biomarkers, each of which correspond to different groups of organisms allows potential identities to be narrowed down. When combined with phenotypic characteristics, specific biomarkers like sugiol become very strong tools in identifying unknown organisms.

=== Identification of Taxodioxylori gypsaceum ===
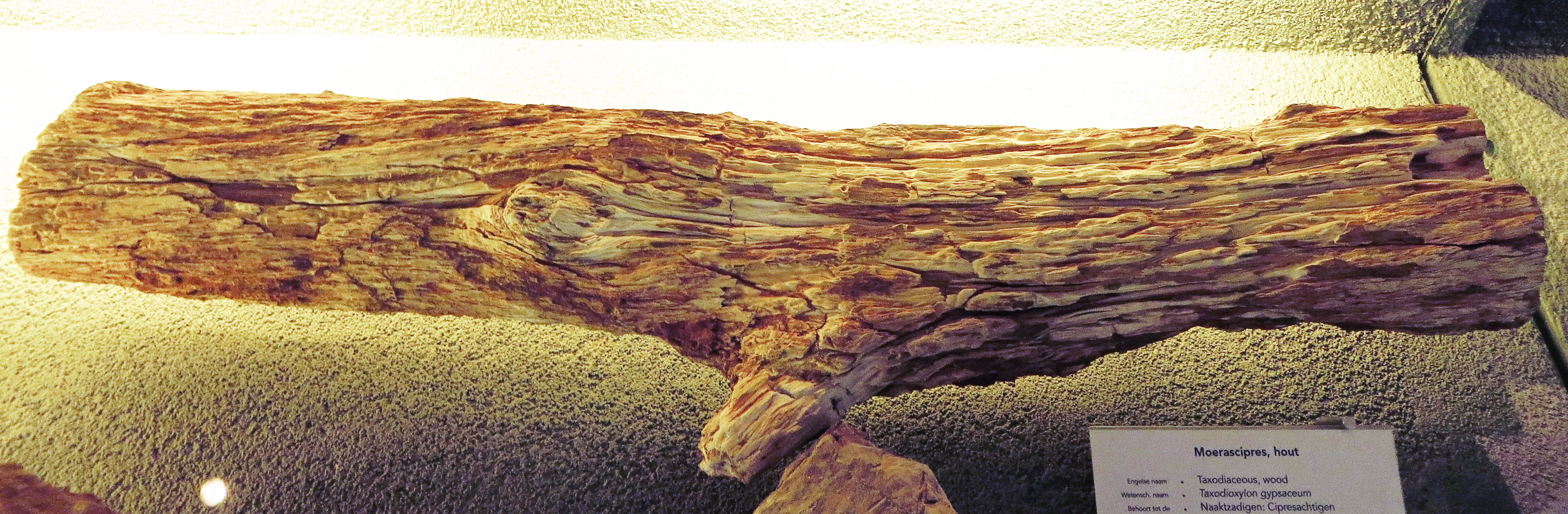
A fossilized sample of Taxodioxylon gypsaceum wood

Taxodioxylon gysaceum is an extinct species of conifer presently found as fossil wood.

Samples of the same wood in various stages of degradation were collected from a forest in Italy, originally existing during the Pliocene period. These samples were milled and filtered into different fractions by coarseness before steam distillation was utilized to extract terpenes. The extraction was then analyzed through GC/MS. The comparative degree of degradation was determined by analysis of holocellulose contents in each sample. Holocellulose refers to the fraction of plant biomass that includes cellulose and hemicellulose but excludes lignin. These carbohydrates are broken down during decomposition, and so their concentrations can be used as a measure of the degree of degradation.

A variety of terpenes were detected in the degraded lignite samples, including more than 10% ferruginol, between 5 and 10% podocarpodiol, and less than 5% of sugiol. These compounds were hypothesized to have become more prevalent in the degraded sample due to preferential decomposition of other compounds. The presence of these terpenes in this sample suggest that the organism belongs to the Cupressaceae, Podocarpaceae, or Taxodiaceae families. Given the specific combination of terpenes present, the sample was identified as Taxodioxylon gypsaceum. This combination of terpenes has also been detected in other samples known to be Taxodioxylon gypsaceum, further supporting this identification.

The yields of terpenes retrieved from these samples were higher than other species that also contain phenolic diterpenes, suggesting that high percentages of sesquiterpenes and diterpenes are an additional biomarker for Taxodioxylon gypsaceum.
