= Abietane =

Names
- IUPAC name Abietane
- Systematic IUPAC name (4aR,4bS,7S,8aS,10aS)-1,1,4a-Trimethyl-7-(propan-2-yl)tetradecahydrophenanthrene
- Other names 13α-Isopropylpodocarpane

Identifiers
CAS Number	19407-12-6
3D model (JSmol)	Interactive image
ChEBI	CHEBI:35673
ChemSpider	5256821
PubChem CID	6857485
CompTox Dashboard (EPA)	DTXSID90425889
- InChI: InChI=1S/C20H36/c1-14(2)15-7-9-17-16(13-15)8-10-18-19(3,4)11-6-12-20(17,18)5/h14-18H,6-13H2,1-5H3/t15-,16-,17-,18-,20+/m0/s1 Key: STIVVCHBLMGYSL-ZYNAIFEFSA-N
- SMILES: [H][C@]12[C@@](C[C@@H](C(C)C)CC2)([H])CC[C@@]3([H])C(C)(C)CCC[C@@]31C

Properties
Chemical formula	C_{20}H_{36}
Molar mass	276.508 g·mol^{−1}
Appearance	colorless
Density	0.876 g/ml
Boiling point	338
- Except where otherwise noted, data are given for materials in their standard state (at 25 °C [77 °F], 100 kPa). verify (what is ?) Infobox references

Abietane is an organic compound with the formula C_{20}H_{36}. It is a tricyclic, saturated hydrocarbon with an elaborate stereochemistry. It is a colorless solid. It is of little biochemical interest except as a reference structure of the abietanes.

== Abietanes ==
Abietane skeleton numbering scheme

Abietanes are a large family of diterpenoids. Individual members of these diterpenoids are also colorless hydrophobic organic compounds. They are usually encountered as mixtures. Most prominent of the abietanes is abietic acid, the major constituent of rosin. Other abietanes are carnosic acid and ferruginol. Some abietanes are of interest in biogeochemistry as markers indicating the source organisms. Abietanes are tricyclic 20-carbon diterpenoids characterized by three fused six-membered rings and alkyl groups at carbons 4, 10, and 13. In higher plants, abietanes and other diterpenoids are synthesized from four five-carbon isoprene units. Abietanes are generally nonpolar, volatile, and less dense than water. The presence of one or more polar functional groups (typically a carboxylic acid or alcohol) tends to increase the polarity and boiling point of a given abietane relative to its unsubstituted hydrocarbon form.

=== Biological sources and synthesis ===
Proposed diagenetic pathway for abietic acid involving defunctionalization and aromatization to form retene

Abietanes found in the rock record are typically interpreted as evidence of higher plants, particularly gymnosperms, in the deep past.

The abietanes are derived, biologically or geologically from abietic acid and related resin acids.

Diagenetic transformation of biomolecules is not fully understood, but several broad diagenetic patterns are hypothesized to affect the transformation of abietanes as they are heated and pressurized in sediments. The first of these patterns is defunctionalization. In particular, the reducing conditions of diagenesis are believed to cause abietanes to lose oxygen-containing functional groups, including carboxylic acids and alcohols, as well as methyl groups. In addition to defunctionalization, abietanes likely undergo dehydrogenation and aromatization reactions to form more energetically stable systems of conjugated pi bonds in their characteristic three ring structure. The hypothesized diagenetic pathway of abietic acid is illustrative of these general patterns. Abietic acid is dehydrogenated to dehydroabietic acid, which then loses its carboxylic acid functional group to become dehydroabietin. Loss of the 5-Me group and further dehydrogenation form the aromatic 1,2,3,4-tetrahydroretene molecule. Final aromatization produces retene, a common biomarker molecule observed in sedimentary samples.

=== Analysis ===
Abietanes found in modern gymnosperm resins as well as in the rock record are separated and characterized by gas chromatography-mass spectrometry (GC-MS). Because polar functional groups reduce molecular volatility and make separation by gas chromatography difficult, abietane derivatives containing carboxylic acid and alcohol moieties are often derivatized with trimethylsilyl groups by treatment with BSTFA prior to GC-MS analysis. More oxidized abietane derivatives have been studied using thermally assisted methylation using tetramethylammonium hydroxide (TMAH) followed by GC-MS analysis. MS-MS analysis has been used to elucidate fragmentation mechanisms for mass spectrum peaks of interest. Mass spectra for abietic acid and some other common abietanes are publicly available in the NIST database. The spectrum for abietic acid possesses characteristic peaks at m/z = 256 and 241.

=== Biogeochemistry of abietanes ===
Abietanes are found in the tissues and resins of certain higher plants, particularly gymnosperms. Although the functions of terpenes are not fully understood, conifers appear to produce abietane diterpenoids as a form of defense against insect and microbial attack. Some abietane diterpenoids, especially aromatic abietenes, are of interest to the pharmacology and natural products communities for their potential biological activities. In the rock record, abietanes are commonly found in amber as well as in fossil wood, sometimes in the form of the mineral fichtelite. Additionally, abietanes are observed in sediments—both riverine and marine—and in coals, where they are often interpreted as geochemical biomarkers for terrestrial input from conifers.

=== Use as a biomarker ===
Abietanes preserved in geological settings are typically interpreted to derive from gymnosperms, specifically conifers. Although both modern angiosperms and modern gymnosperms synthesize terpenoids, gymnosperm tissues tend to contain significantly higher terpenoid concentrations than angiosperm tissues. Additionally, the relative abundances of di-, tri-, and penta-cyclic terpenoids varies between gymnosperms and angiosperms. Although some angiosperm families (notably Burseraceae, Euphorbiaceae and Ranunculaceae) are also known to produce abietanes, in general, tricyclic diterpenoids, including abietanes, are much more abundant in gymnosperms. For these reasons, and because conifers produce significant biomass relative to other gymnosperms, abietanes preserved in geological settings are typically interpreted as conifer biomarkers. However, such interpretations rely on the assumption that terpenoid distributions and abundances in ancient plants were similar to those in modern plants. Loss of more volatile mono- and sesquiterpenoids during diagenetic heating may help explain the different relative abundance of diterpenoids, including abietanes, in ancient resins and the rock record compared to modern conifer samples.

==== Examples from archaeology ====
- Abietenes from colophony, tar, and pitch have been identified in caulking used on ancient ships.
- Abietanes have been used to identify conifer resins associated with Egyptian mummies.
- The ratio of oxidation products of abietanes including dehydroabietic acid and de-7-oxo-dehydroabietic acid and 15-hydroxyl-7-oxo-dehydroabietic acid have been used to estimate the oxidation state of varnish on Vermeer's famous painting, "Girl with a Pearl Earring."

==== Examples from geochemistry ====
- Carbon isotopic measurements of abietanes and other di- and tri-terpenoids have been made in modern plants, as well as in ancient samples, where they reveal a carbon isotope excursion during the Paleocene-Eocene Thermal Maximum (PETM).
- Abietanes found in marine sediments have been used as evidence of ancient terrigenous input.
- Abietane diterpenoids have been attributed to resinous vascular plants in samples dating to the Jurassic.

== See also ==
- Dehydroabietic acid
- Phyllocladane
- Ferruginol
- Labdane
- Pimaric acid
- Simonellite
- 18-Norabietane
