= 18-Norabietane =

Names
- IUPAC name 18-Norabietane
- Systematic IUPAC name (1S,4aS,4bS,7S,8aS)-1,4a-Dimethyl-7-(propan-2-yl)tetradecahydrophenanthrene

Identifiers
CAS Number	2221-95-6
3D model (JSmol)	Interactive image
ChemSpider	4953842
PubChem CID	6451376
UNII	24ST878V9I
CompTox Dashboard (EPA)	DTXSID70176761
- InChI: InChI=1S/C19H34/c1-13(2)15-7-10-18-16(12-15)8-9-17-14(3)6-5-11-19(17,18)4/h13-18H,5-12H2,1-4H3/t14-,15-,16-,17-,18-,19-/m0/s1 Key: HTNCYKZTYXSRHL-DYKIIFRCSA-N
- SMILES: C3C[C@@H]([C@@H]2CC[C@@H]1[C@H](CC[C@H](C(C)C)C1)[C@@]2(C)C3)C

Properties
Chemical formula	C_{19}H_{34}
Molar mass	262.481 g·mol^{−1}
Density	0.883 g/ml

Related compounds
Related compounds	Abietane, Retene, Simonellite
- Except where otherwise noted, data are given for materials in their standard state (at 25 °C [77 °F], 100 kPa). verify (what is ?) Infobox references

18-Norabietane is a diterpene perhydrogenated phenanthrene derivative. It occurs in the mineral fichtelite. Like many "fossil compounds", it is saturated and devoid of oxygen-containing functional groups. Its presence is usually analyzed by gas chromatography–mass spectrometry.
