= Silylation =

Process of addition of silyl group(s) to compounds

Silylation is the introduction of one or more (usually) substituted silyl groups (R_{3}Si) to a molecule. Silylations are core methods for production of organosilicon chemistry. Silanization, while similar to silylation, usually refers to attachment of silyl groups to solids. Silyl groups are commonly used for: alcohol protection, enolate trapping, gas chromatography, electron-impact mass spectrometry (EI-MS), and coordinating with metal complexes.

== Protection chemistry ==
=== Protection ===
Silylation is often used to protect alcohols, as well as amines, carboxylic acids, and terminal alkynes. The products after silylation, namely silyl ethers and silyl amines, are resilient toward basic conditions. Protection is typically done by reacting the functional group with a silyl halide by an S_{N}2 reaction mechanism, typically in the presence of base.

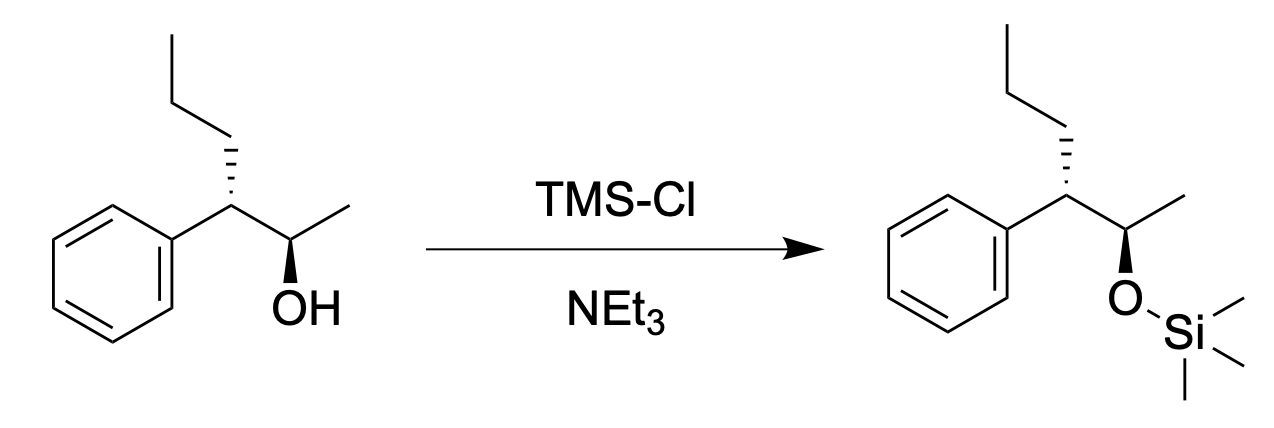

The protection mechanism begins with the base deprotonating the alcohol group. Next, the deprotonated alcohol group attacks the silyl atom of the silyl halide compound. The halide acts as a leaving group and ends up in solution. A workup step follows to remove any excess base within the solution. The overall reaction scheme is as follows:

1. ROH + NEt_{3} → RO^{−} + H−NEt^{+}_{3}
2. RO^{−} + Cl−SiMe_{3} → RO−SiMe_{3} + Cl^{−}

Bis(trimethylsilyl)acetamide, a popular reagent for silylation

Other silylating agents include bis(trimethylsilyl)acetamide (BSA). The reaction of BSA with alcohols gives the corresponding trimethylsilyl ether, together with acetamide as a byproduct (Me = CH_{3}):

2 ROH + MeC(OSiMe_{3})NSiMe_{3} → MeC(O)NH_{2} + 2 ROSiMe_{3}

=== Deprotection ===
Due to the strength of the Si-F bond, fluoride salts are commonly used as a deprotecting agent of silyl groups. The primary fluorous deprotecting agent is tetra-n-butylammonium fluoride (TBAF), as its aliphatic chains in help incorporate the fluoride ion into organic solvents.

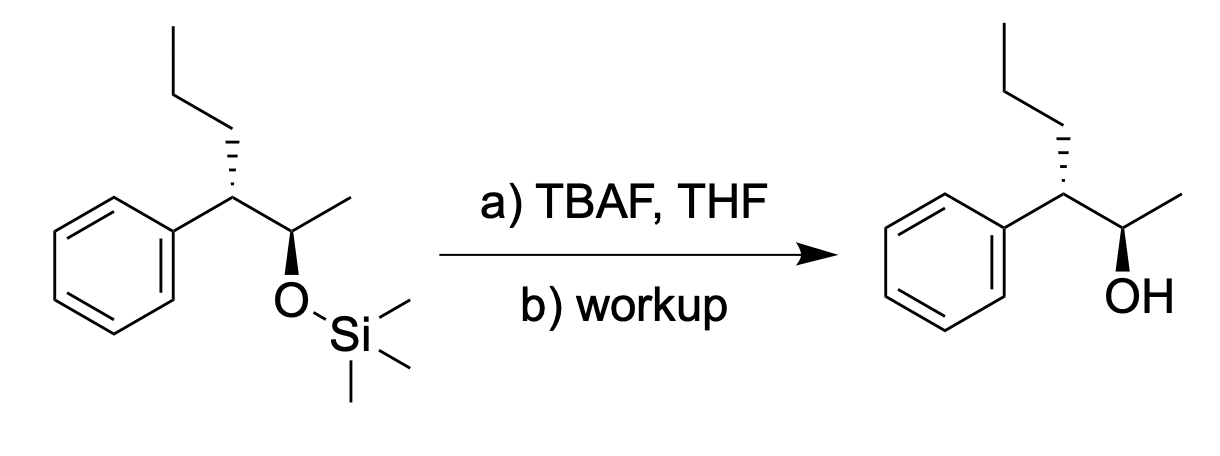

Deprotection with a fluoride ion occurs by an S_{N}2 mechanism, followed by acidic workup to protonate the resulting alkoxide:

ROSiMe_{3} + NBu_{4}F → RO^{−} + NBu^{+}_{4} + SiMe_{3}F

Deprotection of the alcohol can also be done using either Brønsted acids or Lewis acid conditions. Brønsted acids, like PyBr_{3} (pyridinium tribromide), deprotect the alcohol by acting as a proton donor.

=== Modifying silyl reactivity ===
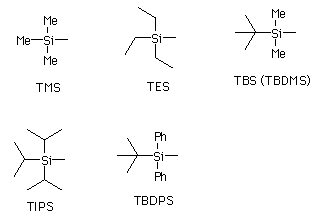
Common types of alkyl silyl protecting groups

Sterically bulkier alkyl substituents tend to decrease the reactivity of the silyl group. Consequently, bulky substituents increase the silyl group's protective abilities. To add bulkier alkyl silyls, more strenuous conditions are required for alcohol protection. As bulkier groups require more strenuous conditions to add, they also require more strenuous conditions to remove. Additionally, bulkier silyl groups are more selective for the type of alcohols they react with, resulting in a preference for primary alcohols over secondary alcohols. Thus, silyl groups such as TBDMS and TIPS can be used to selectively protect primary alcohols over secondary alcohols.

In acidic conditions, alkyl substituents acting as electron withdrawing groups decrease the reaction rate. As bulker silyl groups are more likely to be electron withdrawing, it is easier to differentiate between less and more bulky silyl groups. Therefore, acidic deprotection occurs fastest for less sterically bulky alkyl silyl groups. In basic conditions, alkyl substituents acting as electron donating groups decrease reaction rate.

=== Enolate trapping ===
Silylation can also be used to trap reactive compounds for isolation or identification. A common example of this is by trapping reactive enolates into silyl enol ethers, which represent reactive tautomers of many carbonyl compounds. The original enolate can be reformed upon reaction with an organolithium, or other strong base.

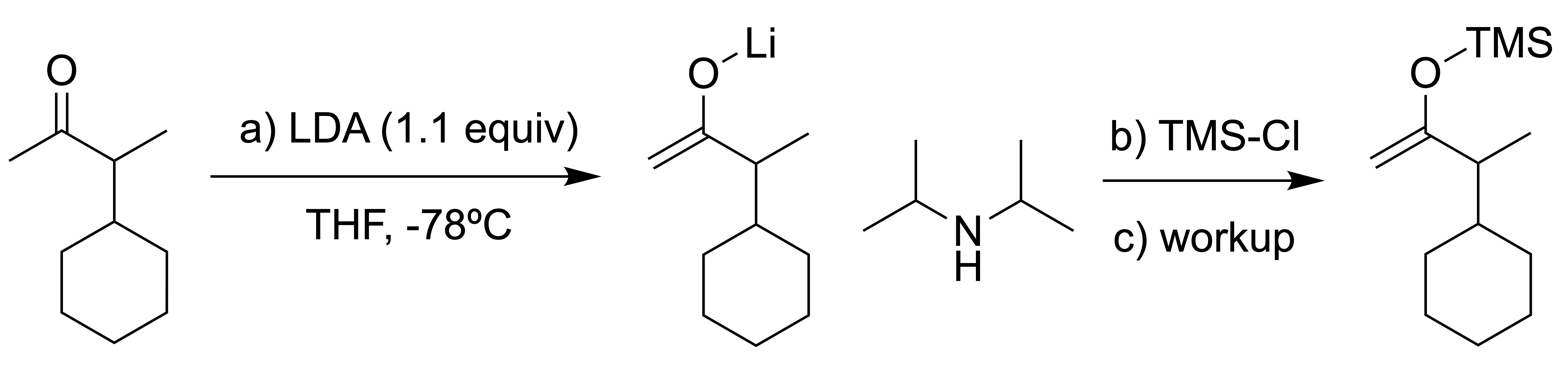

== Applications in analysis ==
The introduction of a silyl group(s) gives derivatives of enhanced volatility, making the derivatives suitable for analysis by gas chromatography and electron-impact mass spectrometry (EI-MS). For EI-MS, the silyl derivatives give more favorable diagnostic fragmentation patterns of use in structure investigations, or characteristic ions of use in trace analyses employing selected ion monitoring and related techniques.

== Of metals ==
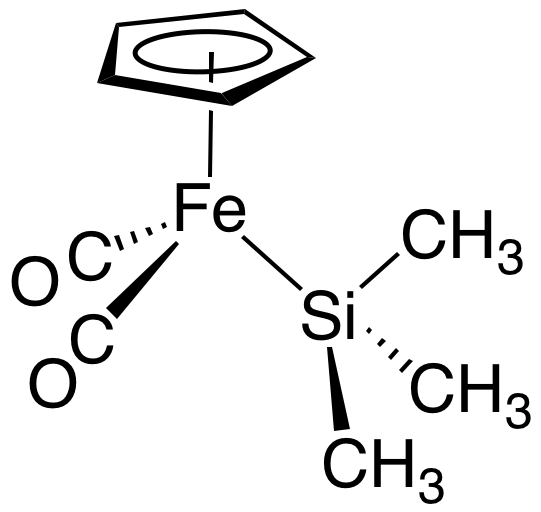
CpFe(CO)_{2}Si(CH_{3})_{3}, a trimethylsilyl complex.

Coordination complexes with silyl ligands are well known. An early example is CpFe(CO)_{2}Si(CH_{3})_{3}, prepared by silylation of CpFe(CO)_{2}Na with trimethylsilyl chloride. Typical routes include oxidative addition of Si-H bonds to low-valent metals. Metal silyl complexes are intermediates in hydrosilation, a process used to make organosilicon compounds on both laboratory and commercial scales.

== See also ==
- Silyl ether
- Hydrosilylation
