= C18H18 =

The molecular formula C_{18}H_{18} (molar mass: 234.33 g/mol, exact mass: 234.1409 u) may refer to:

- Cyclooctadecanonaene, or [18]annulene
- Retene
