= Secodehydroabietic acid =

Names
- IUPAC name (1R)-1,3-dimethyl-2-[2-(3-propan-2-ylphenyl)ethyl]cyclohexane-1-carboxylic acid
- Other names: seco-dehydroabietic acid

Identifiers
CAS Number	117536-59-1
3D model (JSmol)	Interactive image
ChemSpider	95636432
PubChem CID	133065648
- InChI: InChI=1S/C20H30O2/c1-14(2)17-9-5-8-16(13-17)10-11-18-15(3)7-6-12-20(18,4)19(21)22/h5,8-9,13-15,18H,6-7,10-12H2,1-4H3,(H,21,22)/t15?,18?,20-/m1/s1 Key: UXBFAGQTUAMQSX-PKUWUEBNSA-N
- SMILES: CC1CCC[C@@](C1CCC2=CC(=CC=C2)C(C)C)(C)C(=O)O

Properties
Chemical formula	C_{20}H_{30}O_{2}
Molar mass	302.458 g·mol^{−1}
Density	g/cm^{3}
Solubility in water	Practically insoluble
- Except where otherwise noted, data are given for materials in their standard state (at 25 °C [77 °F], 100 kPa). Infobox references

Secodehydroabietic acid is a naturally occurring organic compound classified as a diterpenoid with the molecular formula C_{20}H_{30}O_{2}.

== Structure ==
Secodehydroabietic acid is an abietane-type diterpenoid resin acid derivative. The compound features a modified structure compared to dehydroabietic acid, often arising from oxidation or degradation processes in coniferous tree resins.

== Natural occurrence ==
The acid appears in environmental analyses of sediments and bile from aquatic organisms exposed to resin acids from pulp mill effluents, alongside dehydroabietic acid. It forms as a degradation product of abietane diterpenoids in coniferous resins during oxidation or microbial breakdown.
