= C20H36 =

The molecular formula C_{20}H_{36} (molar mass: 276.51 g/mol, exact mass: 276.2817 u) may refer to:

- Taxanes, a class of diterpene
- Abietane
