= Organic molecular tracers =

Organic chemicals for environmental study

Organic molecular tracers in pollution control and environmental science are referred to as organic molecular markers or emission markers, and are compounds or compound classes. These tracers are of interest in the field of air quality because they can help identify particulate emission sources, as they are relatively unique to those sources. This approach is generally applied to particulate matter under 2.5μm in diameter because of the formation mechanisms and the health risks associated with this size regime. With tracer compounds, the principles of mass balance are used to 'trace' emissions from the source to the receptor site where a sample is taken. Use of organic tracers has become more common as measurement quality has improved, costs have decreased, and compounds that were historically good tracers, such as lead, have decreased in ambient concentrations due to various factors including government regulation.

== Requirements ==
In order to be used as a tracer, a compound must be emitted preferentially by some sources and not by others, giving the emission source a relatively unique chemical makeup. The compound must react slowly enough in the atmosphere that it is chemically conserved from the emission source to the receptor site where an ambient sample may be taken. Additionally, a tracer species should not be formed in the atmosphere and it should not volatilize during transport so that mass balance is maintained. Tracer compounds must then be of primary origins (not formed in the atmosphere), which are created through condensation and coagulation of mainly combustion and biological sources.

== Examples ==
Samples have been analyzed from many known biogenic and anthropogenic emissions sources such as diesel and gasoline vehicles, cigarette smoke, road dust, vegetative detritus, wood smoke, and meat cooking. Examples of some results of preferential emissions from sources include hopanes, polycyclic aromatic hydrocarbons and steranes from different types of mobile sources, retene and methoxyphenols from wood smoke, odd n-alkanes and even n-alkanoic acids from vegetative detritus, cholesterol and the C16 and C18 n-alkanoic acids from cooking, and lighter n-alkanes from brake wear.

== Analytic use ==
Chemical analysis of ambient and source samples is performed using gas chromatography-mass spectrometry, and the chemical profile of the emission sources can be compared to an ambient sample using chemical mass balance techniques to identify the ambient mass contribution from each pollution source. This approach assumes that an ambient air sample has particulate matter contributions from a linear combination of emission sources. If the chemical compositions of local sources are not available, source apportionment models such as positive matrix factorization and principal components analysis can be used by employing statistical methods to identify emissions sources from time series of ambient samples.
