= Cadalene =

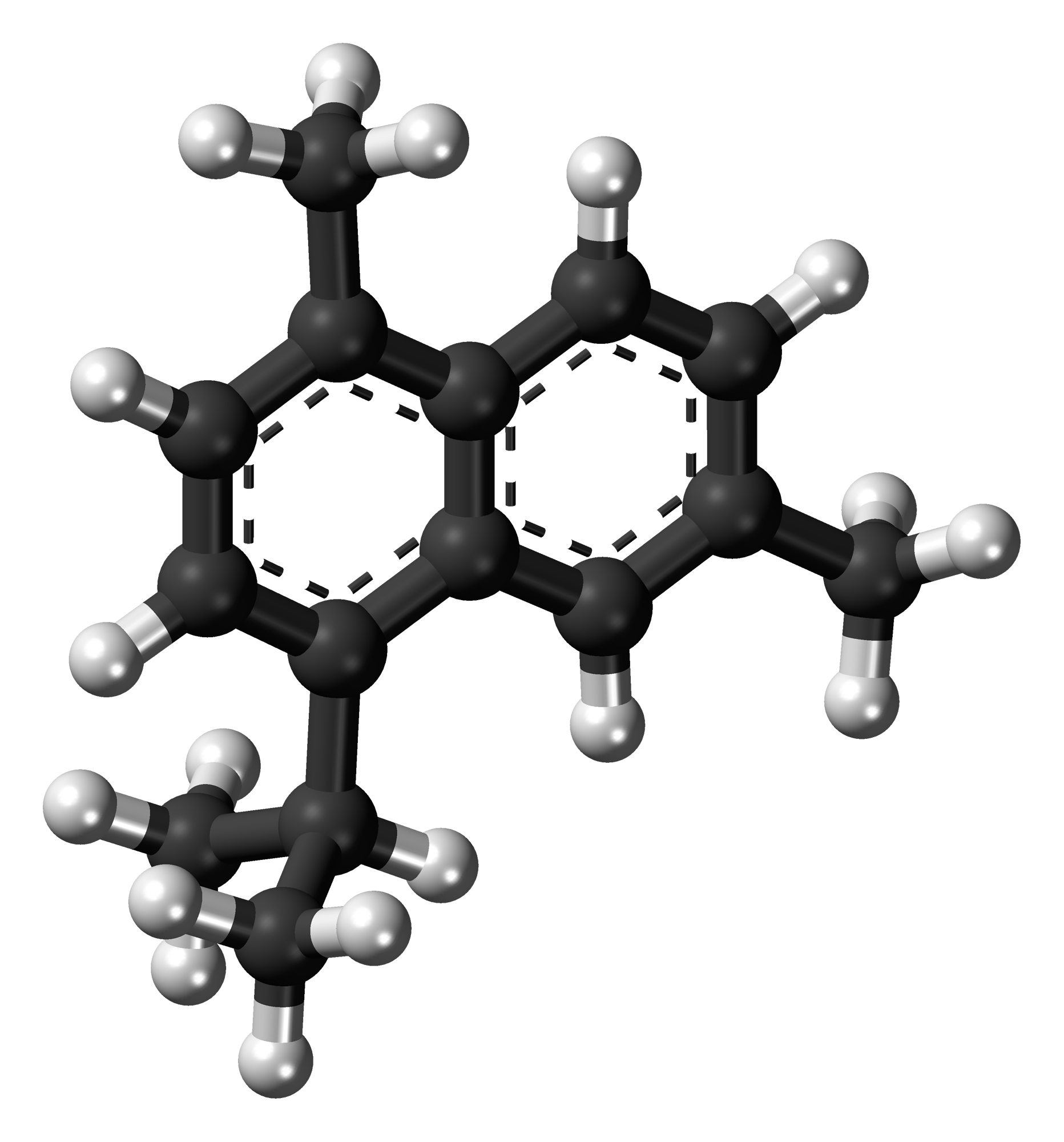

Names
- IUPAC name 4-Isopropyl-1,6-dimethylnaphthalene
- Preferred IUPAC name 1,6-Dimethyl-4-(propan-2-yl)naphthalene
- Other names Cadalin

Identifiers
CAS Number	483-78-3
3D model (JSmol)	Interactive image
ChemSpider	9808
ECHA InfoCard	100.110.415
PubChem CID	10225
UNII	49X2436USB
CompTox Dashboard (EPA)	DTXSID40197483
- InChI: InChI=1/C15H18/c1-10(2)13-8-6-12(4)14-7-5-11(3)9-15(13)14/h5-10H,1-4H3 Key: VMOJIHDTVZTGDO-UHFFFAOYAQ
- SMILES: c12c(ccc(c1ccc(c2)C)C)C(C)C

Properties
Chemical formula	C_{15}H_{18}
Molar mass	198.30342
Appearance	Colorless liquid
- Except where otherwise noted, data are given for materials in their standard state (at 25 °C [77 °F], 100 kPa). Infobox references

Cadalene or cadalin (4-isopropyl-1,6-dimethylnaphthalene) is a polycyclic aromatic hydrocarbon with a chemical formula C_{15}H_{18} and a cadinane skeleton. It is derived from generic sesquiterpenes, and ubiquitous in essential oils of many higher plants.

Cadalene, together with retene, simonellite and ip-iHMN, is a biomarker of higher plants, which makes it useful for paleobotanic analysis of rock sediments.

The ratio of retene to cadalene in sediments can reveal the ratio of the genus Pinaceae in the biosphere.
