= Methyl dehydroabietate =

- Skeletal formula

Names
- Preferred IUPAC name Methyl (4β)-abieta-9(11),8(14),12-trien-18-oate

Identifiers
CAS Number	1235-74-1
3D model (JSmol)	Interactive image
ChEBI	CHEBI:228313
ChEMBL	ChEMBL12798
ChemSpider	13919
PubChem CID	14697
UNII	4P47O55S2W
CompTox Dashboard (EPA)	DTXSID10880714
- InChI: InChI=1S/C21H30O2/c1-14(2)15-7-9-17-16(13-15)8-10-18-20(17,3)11-6-12-21(18,4)19(22)23-5/h7,9,13-14,18H,6,8,10-12H2,1-5H3/t18-,20-,21-/m1/s1 Key: PGZCJOPTDHWYES-HMXCVIKNSA-N
- SMILES: COC(=O)C1(C)CCCC2(C)c3ccc(C(C)C)cc3CCC12

Properties
Chemical formula	C_{21}H_{30}O_{2}
Molar mass	314.46 g/mol
Appearance	White to off-white solid
Density	1.017 g/cm^{3}
Boiling point	390.2 °C (734.4 °F; 663.3 K) at 760 mmHg
Solubility in water	Practically insoluble in water; soluble in organic solvents

Hazards
- Occupational safety and health (OHS/OSH)
Main hazards	Not extensively studied; handle with care
- GHS labelling
Pictograms	(GHS07: Exclamation mark)
Signal word	Warning
Hazard statements	H302, H315, H319, H335
Precautionary statements	P261, P305+P351+P338
Flash point	184.3°C
Autoignition temperature	Not available
- Except where otherwise noted, data are given for materials in their standard state (at 25 °C [77 °F], 100 kPa). (what is ?) Infobox references

Methyl dehydroabietate is a methyl ester derivative of dehydroabietic acid. It is a natural product that is encountered in resin acid found in coniferous trees. It has a tricyclic diterpenoid structure and can be used in the total synthesis of some chemical derivatives.

== Chemical properties ==
It has the molecular formula of C_{21}H_{30}O_{2} and a M.W. of 314.46 g/mol. It appears like a white-to-grey solid with a boiling point of 390.2 °C at 760 mmHg and has a flash point of 184.3 °C. Being insoluble in water, it is actually soluble in ethanol and DMSO.

== Synthesis and derivatives ==
It can be synthesized through the esterification of dehydroabietic acid. Several derivatives, for instance, chalcone and pyrazole derivatives can be synthesized. Some studies have helped in understanding its steric and electronic effects.

== Biological activity ==
Research indicates that methyl dehydroabietate exhibits several biological activities, such as antibacterial properties, and also, some antioxidant activity.

== Applications ==
Due to its chemical properties, methyl dehydroabietate is utilized in cosmetic industry, and also in pharmaceuticals as a starting material for synthesizing derivatives.

Its toxicological data is rather limited. However, in labs should be handled with care, because it can cause skin and eye irritation, or even respiratory irritation.
