= Bis(trimethylsilyl)acetamide =

Chemical compound

- Structural formula of (E)-bis(trimethylsilyl)acetamide

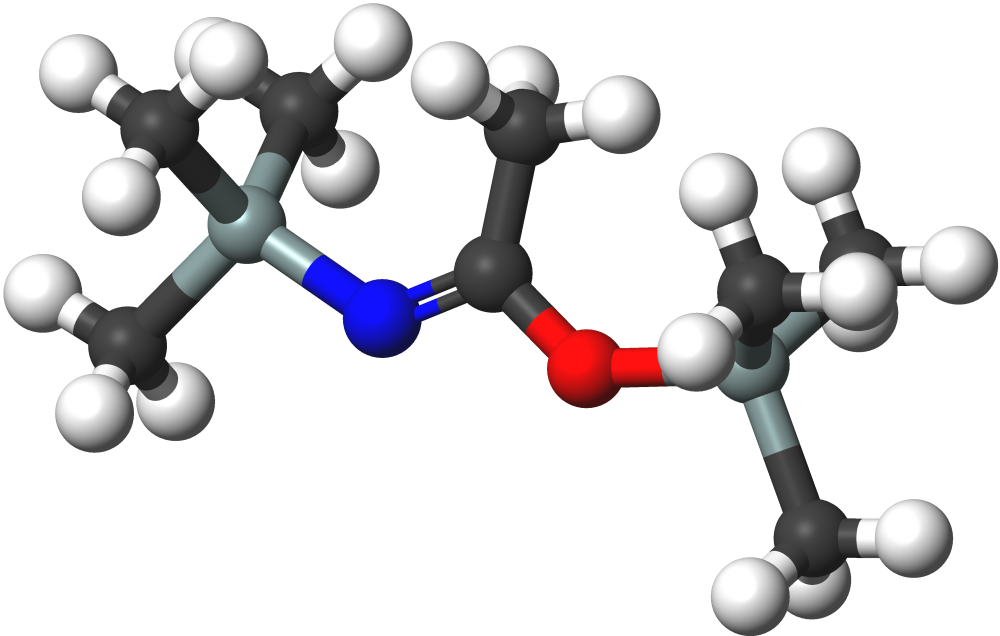
- Ball and stick model of (E)-bis(trimethylsilyl)acetamide

Names
- Preferred IUPAC name Trimethylsilyl N-(trimethylsilyl)ethanecarboximidate
- Other names N,O-Bis(trimethylsilyl)acetamide

Identifiers
CAS Number	10416-59-8
3D model (JSmol)	Interactive image; Interactive image
Abbreviations	BSA
Beilstein Reference	1306669
ChemSpider	23581; 4523073 (E); 10516629 (Z)
ECHA InfoCard	100.030.799
EC Number	233-892-7
MeSH	N,O-bis(trimethylsilyl)acetamide
PubChem CID	25248; 6913588 (E); 5372922 (Z)
RTECS number	AK3000000
UNII	R14N49I64O
UN number	2920
CompTox Dashboard (EPA)	DTXSID5051525
- InChI: InChI=1S/C8H21NOSi2/c1-8(9-11(2,3)4)10-12(5,6)7/h1-7H3 Key: SIOVKLKJSOKLIF-UHFFFAOYSA-N; InChI=1/C8H21NOSi2/c1-8(9-11(2,3)4)10-12(5,6)7/h1-7H3/b9-8+
- SMILES: CC(=N[Si](C)(C)C)O[Si](C)(C)C; CC(O[Si](C)(C)C)=N[Si](C)(C)C

Properties
Chemical formula	C_{8}H_{21}NOSi_{2}
Molar mass	203.432 g·mol^{−1}
Appearance	Liquid
Density	0.832 g cm^{−3}
Melting point	24 °C (75 °F; 297 K)
Boiling point	71 to 73 °C (160 to 163 °F; 344 to 346 K) at 35mmHg

Hazards
- GHS labelling
Pictograms	(GHS02: Flammable) (GHS05: Corrosive) (GHS07: Exclamation mark)
Signal word	Danger
Hazard statements	H226, H302, H314
Precautionary statements	P210, P233, P240, P241, P242, P243, P260, P264, P270, P280, P301+P312, P301+P330+P331, P303+P361+P353, P304+P340, P305+P351+P338, P310, P321, P330, P363, P370+P378, P403+P235, P405, P501

Related compounds
Related Amides	Dimethylacetamide
- Except where otherwise noted, data are given for materials in their standard state (at 25 °C [77 °F], 100 kPa). Infobox references

Bis(trimethylsilyl)acetamide (BSA) is an organosilicon compound with the formula MeC(OSiMe_{3})NSiMe_{3} (Me = CH_{3}). It is a colorless liquid that is soluble in diverse organic solvents, but reacts rapidly with moisture and solvents containing OH and NH groups. It is used in analytical chemistry to increase the volatility of analytes, e.g., for gas chromatography. It is also used to introduce the trimethylsilyl protecting group in organic synthesis. A related reagent is N,O-bis(trimethylsilyl)trifluoroacetamide (BSTFA).

== Synthesis and reactions ==
BSA is prepared by treating acetamide with trimethylsilyl chloride in the presence of a base (Me = CH_{3}, Et = C_{2}H_{5}):

MeC(O)NH_{2} + 2 SiMe_{3}Cl + 2 Et_{3}N→ MeC(OSiMe_{3})NSiMe_{3} + 2 Et_{3}NHCl

The reaction of BSA with alcohols gives the corresponding trimethylsilyl ether, together with acetamide as a byproduct (Me = CH_{3}):

2 ROH + MeC(OSiMe_{3})NSiMe_{3} → MeC(O)NH_{2} + 2 ROSiMe_{3}
