= Fichtelite =

Organic mineral

- Chemical structure of fichtelite

General
- Category: Organic mineral
- Formula: C_{19}H_{34}
- IMA symbol: Fic
- Strunz classification: 10.BA.05; Hydrocarbons
- Dana classification: 50.03.04.01
- Crystal system: Monoclinic
- Crystal class: Sphenoidal (2) (same H-M symbol)
- Space group: P2_{1}

Identification
- Color: Colorless, white, pale yellow
- Crystal habit: Elongated tabular crystals
- Cleavage: Good on {001} and {100}
- Mohs scale hardness: 1
- Luster: Greasy
- Streak: White
- Diaphaneity: Transparent
- Specific gravity: 0.631 calculated 1.032
- Optical properties: Biaxial
- Melting point: 44.2 °C – 45.0 °C

Fichtelite is a rare white mineral found in fossilized wood from Bavaria. It crystallizes in the monoclinic crystal system. It is a cyclic hydrocarbon: (dimethyl)(isopropyl)perhydrophenanthrene, C_{19}H_{34}. It is very soft with a Mohs hardness of 1, the same as talc. Its specific gravity is very low at 1.032, just slightly denser than water.

It was first described in 1841 and named for the location, Fichtelgebirge, Bavaria, Germany. It has been reported from fossilized pine wood from a peat bog and in organic-rich modern marine sediments.
