= BSTFA =

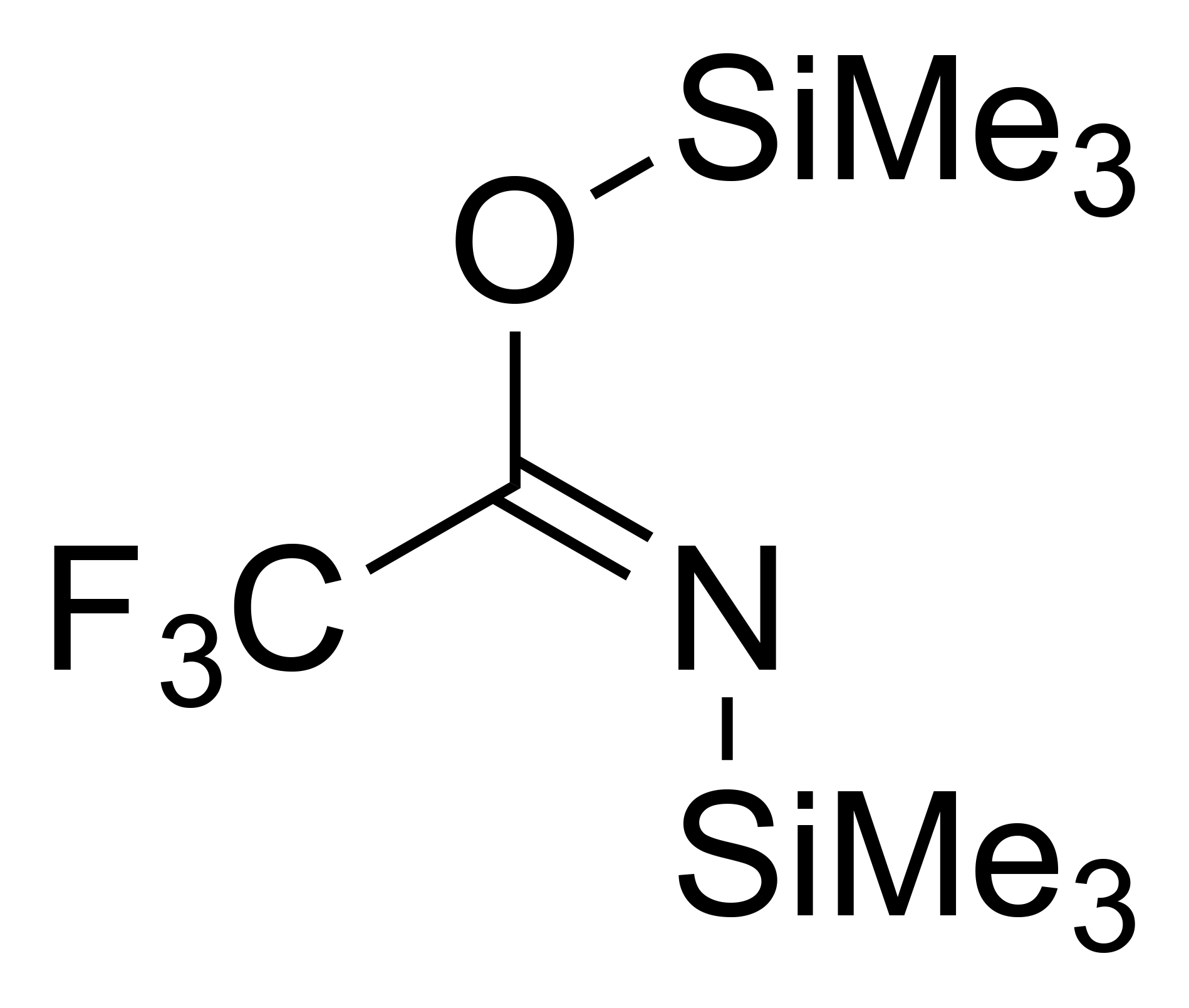

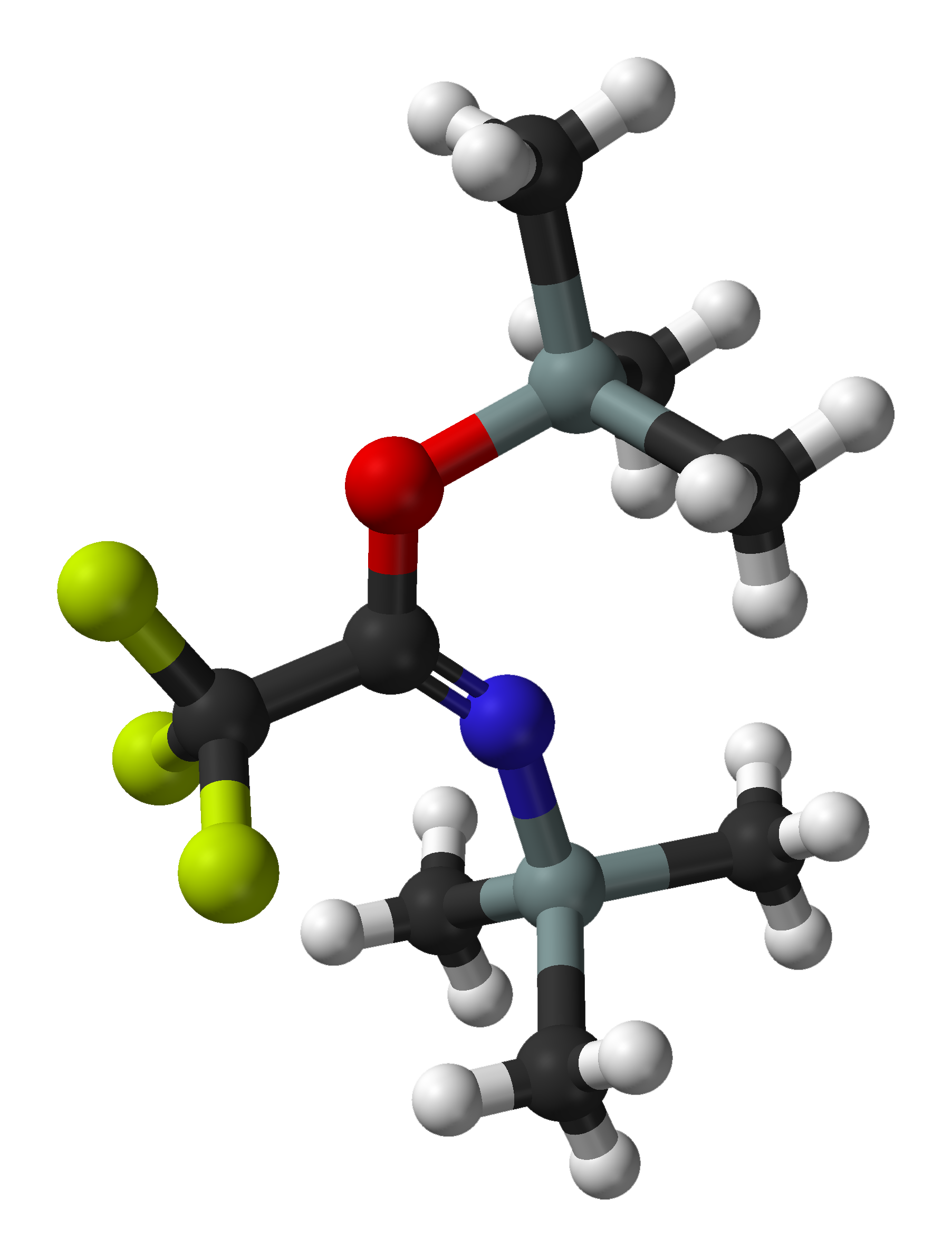

Names
- IUPAC name trimethylsilyl 2,2,2-trifluoro-N-trimethylsilylethanimidate
- Other names BSTFA, N,O-Bis(trimethylsilyl)trifluoroacetamide

Identifiers
CAS Number	25561-30-2
3D model (JSmol)	Interactive image
ChEBI	CHEBI:85067
ChemSpider	4518443
ECHA InfoCard	100.042.807
PubChem CID	94358
CompTox Dashboard (EPA)	DTXSID001015789
- InChI: InChI=1S/C8H18F3NOSi2/c1-14(2,3)12-7(8(9,10)11)13-15(4,5)6/h1-6H3/b12-7+ Key: XCOBLONWWXQEBS-KPKJPENVSA-N; InChI=1/C8H18F3NOSi2/c1-14(2,3)12-7(8(9,10)11)13-15(4,5)6/h1-6H3/b12-7+ Key: XCOBLONWWXQEBS-KPKJPENVBV
- SMILES: C[Si](C)(C)O\C(\C(F)(F)F)=N\[Si](C)(C)C

Properties
Chemical formula	C_{8}H_{18}F_{3}NOSi_{2}
Molar mass	257.403 g·mol^{−1}
Appearance	colourless liquid
Density	0.96
Melting point	−10 °C (14 °F; 263 K)
Boiling point	45–55 °C (113–131 °F; 318–328 K) 14 mm Hg
- Except where otherwise noted, data are given for materials in their standard state (at 25 °C [77 °F], 100 kPa). verify (what is ?) Infobox references

N,O-Bis(trimethylsilyl)trifluoroacetamide (BSTFA) is an organosilicon compound. It is a colorless liquid that is very sensitive to traces of water or alcohols.

It is often used to convert hydroxyl groups to trimethylsilyl ether groups (Me = CH_{3}):

ROH + CF_{3}C(OSiMe_{3})NSiMe_{3} → CF_{3}C(O)NH(SiMe_{3}) + ROSiMe_{3}

These silylated derivatives are amenable to analysis or further manipulation. Siloxanes are invariably more volatile than their hydroxyl precursors, and thus they can be more easily analyzed with gas chromatography.

This reagent was first reported in 1968.

== Related compound ==
- Bis(trimethylsilyl)acetamide, MeC(OSiMe_{3})NSiMe_{3}
