= Phyllocladane =

Chemical compound

Names
- IUPAC name (1R,4S,9S,10R,13S,14S)-5,5,9,14-Tetramethyltetracyclo[11.2.1.01,10.04,9]hexadecane
- Other names (8α,9β)-Kaurane

Identifiers
CAS Number	133097-76-4
3D model (JSmol)	Interactive image
ChemSpider	66423789
PubChem CID	12304768
- InChI: InChI=1S/C20H34/c1-14-12-20-11-8-16-18(2,3)9-5-10-19(16,4)17(20)7-6-15(14)13-20/h14-17H,5-13H2,1-4H3/t14-,15-,16-,17-,19-,20+/m0/s1 Key: IVZWRQBQDVHDNG-BUJXUYPKSA-N
- SMILES: C[C@H]1C[C@@]23CC[C@@H]4[C@@]([C@@H]2CC[C@H]1C3)(CCCC4(C)C)C

Properties
Chemical formula	C_{20}H_{34}
Molar mass	274.492 g·mol^{−1}
- Except where otherwise noted, data are given for materials in their standard state (at 25 °C [77 °F], 100 kPa). Infobox references

Phyllocladane is a tricyclic diterpane which is generally found in gymnosperm resins. It has a formula of C_{20}H_{34} and a molecular weight of 274.4840. As a biomarker, it can be used to learn about the gymnosperm input into a hydrocarbon deposit, and about the age of the deposit in general. It indicates a terrigenous origin of the source rock. Diterpanes, such as Phyllocladane are found in source rocks as early as the middle and late Devonian periods, which indicates any rock containing them must be no more than approximately 360 Ma. Phyllocladane is commonly found in lignite, and like other resinites derived from gymnosperms, is naturally enriched in ^{13}C. This enrichment is a result of the enzymatic pathways used to synthesize the compound.

The compound can be identified by GC-MS. A peak of m/z 123 is indicative of tricyclic diterpenoids in general, and phyllocladane in particular is further characterized by strong peaks at m/z 231 and m/z 189. Presence of phyllocladane and its relative abundance to other tricyclic diterpenes can be used to differentiate between various oil fields.
