= Simonellite =

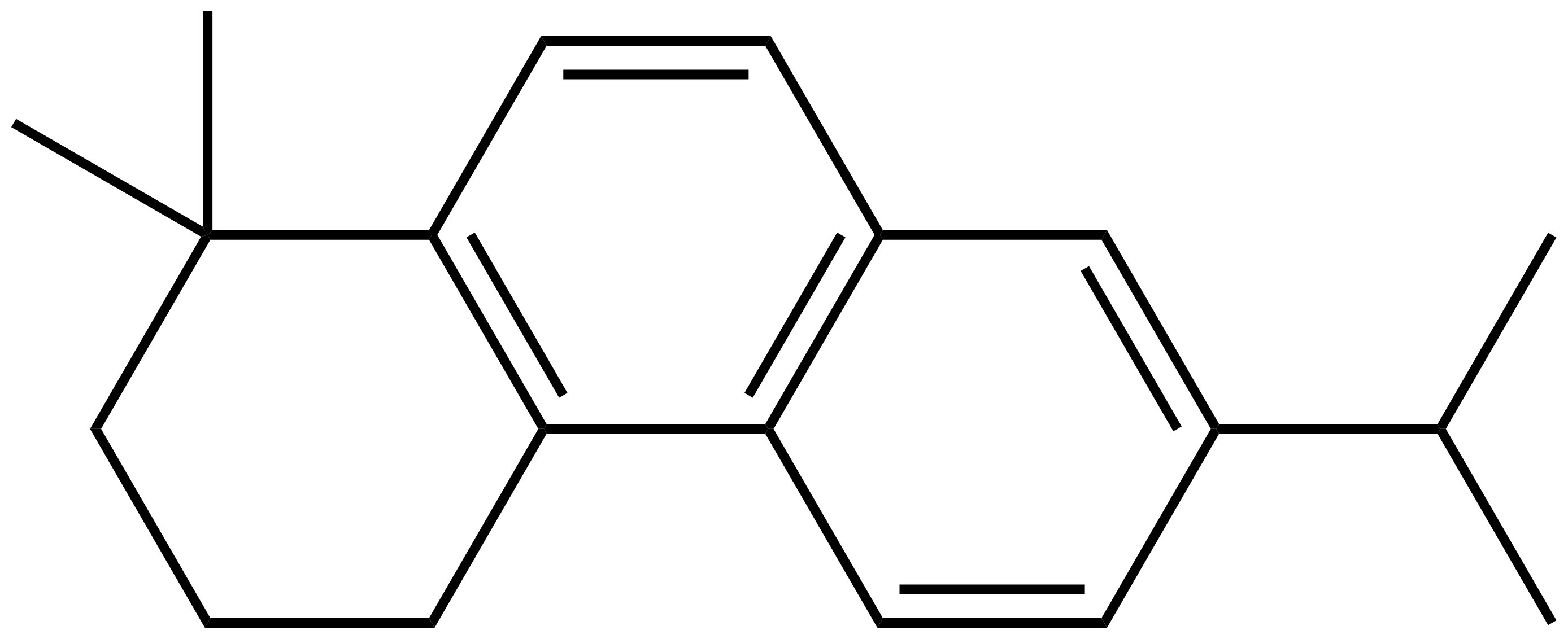

Names
- Preferred IUPAC name 1,1-Dimethyl-6-(propan-2-yl)-1,2,3,4-tetrahydrophenanthrene

Identifiers
CAS Number	27530-79-6
3D model (JSmol)	Interactive image
ChemSpider	153688
PubChem CID	176455
UNII	C4NA2DCQ93
CompTox Dashboard (EPA)	DTXSID00181949
- InChI: InChI=1S/C19H24/c1-13(2)14-7-9-16-15(12-14)8-10-18-17(16)6-5-11-19(18,3)4/h7-10,12-13H,5-6,11H2,1-4H3 Key: XZDCNNOTTUOTGE-UHFFFAOYSA-N; InChI=1/C19H24/c1-13(2)14-7-9-16-15(12-14)8-10-18-17(16)6-5-11-19(18,3)4/h7-10,12-13H,5-6,11H2,1-4H3 Key: XZDCNNOTTUOTGE-UHFFFAOYAJ
- SMILES: CC(CCC3)(C)c2c3c1ccc(C(C)C)cc1cc2

Properties
Chemical formula	C_{19}H_{24}
Molar mass	252.38 g/mol
- Except where otherwise noted, data are given for materials in their standard state (at 25 °C [77 °F], 100 kPa). verify (what is ?) Infobox references

Simonellite (1,1-dimethyl-1,2,3,4-tetrahydro-7-isopropyl phenanthrene) is a polycyclic aromatic hydrocarbon with a chemical formula C_{19}H_{24}. It is similar to retene.

Simonellite occurs naturally as an organic mineral derived from diterpenes present in conifer resins. It is named after its discoverer, Vittorio Simonelli (1860–1929), an Italian geologist. It forms colorless to white orthorhombic crystals. It occurs in Fognano, Tuscany, Italy.

Simonellite, together with cadalene, retene and ip-iHMN, is a biomarker of higher plants, which makes it useful for paleobotanic analysis of rock sediments.

== See also ==
- Fichtelite
- Retene
