= Dehydroabietic acid =

- Skeletal formula

Names
- Preferred IUPAC name Abieta-8,11,13-trien-18-oic acid
- Other names DAA; DHA

Identifiers
| CAS Number | 1740-19-8 |
| 3D model (JSmol) | Interactive image |
| ChEBI | CHEBI:29571 |
| ChEMBL | ChEMBL12850 |
| ChemSpider | 85184 |
| ECHA InfoCard | 100.015.548 |
| EC Number | 217-102-8 |
| KEGG | C12078 |
| PubChem CID | 94391 |
| UNII | 0S5XP6S3AU |
| CompTox Dashboard (EPA) | DTXSID8022163 |
- InChI: InChI=1S/C20H28O2/c1-13(2)14-6-8-16-15(12-14)7-9-17-19(16,3)10-5-11-20(17,4)18(21)22/h6,8,12-13,17H,5,7,9-11H2,1-4H3,(H,21,22)/t17-,19-,20-/m1/s1 Key: NFWKVWVWBFBAOV-MISYRCLQSA-N
- SMILES: CC(C)C1=CC2=C(C=C1)C3(CCCC(C3CC2)(C)C(=O)O)C

Properties
| Chemical formula | C_{20}H_{28}O_{2} |
| Molar mass | 300.442 g·mol^{−1} |
| Appearance | White to off-white solid |
| Density | 1.03 g/cm^{3} |
| Melting point | 150–153 °C (302–307 °F; 423–426 K) |
| Boiling point | 390 °C (734 °F; 663 K) |
| Solubility in water | Practically insoluble in water; soluble in organic solvents |

Hazards
- Occupational safety and health (OHS/OSH)
| Main hazards | Harmful if swallowed; causes skin and eye irritation |
- GHS labelling
| Pictograms | (GHS06: Toxic) (GHS09: Environmental hazard) |
| Signal word | Danger |
| Hazard statements | H301, H410 |
| Precautionary statements | P273, P301+P310+P330 |
| Flash point | 184.3°C |
| Autoignition temperature | Not available |
- Except where otherwise noted, data are given for materials in their standard state (at 25 °C [77 °F], 100 kPa). (what is ?) Infobox references

Dehydroabietic acid is a naturally occurring abietane-type diterpenoid resin acid, which is found in coniferous trees. It actually is the main component of rosin. This acid has several industrial applications because of its chemical properties.

== Chemical properties ==
Dehydroabietic acid has a molecular formula of C_{20}H_{28}O_{2} and also, a M.W. of 300.44 g/mol. It is a white to grey colored solid, having a melting point of 150–153 °C and a boiling point of ca. 390 °C. The compound is not soluble to water, but is highly soluble in ethanol and acetone.

== Biological activity ==
It exhibits a range of biological activities, which among others, include:

- Anti-inflammatory activity: Acts as a dual activator of peroxisome proliferator-activated receptors alpha and gamma (PPAR α/γ).
- Antimicrobial activity: Demonstrates antibacterial properties against multidrug-resistant strains.
- Anticancer activity: Certain derivatives of this compound have the potential to be used as anticancer agents.

== Applications ==
Due to its high bioactivity, dehydroabietic acid is used today as a key compound for developing anti-inflammatory and anticancer drugs. In the industry, it is utilised in the synthesis of varnishes and adhesives. In the papermaking, it is also used as an additive.

Dehydroabietic acid should be always handled with care. It can be harmful if swallowed and can cause skin and eye irritation.

== See also ==
- Secodehydroabietic acid
