= Retene =

- Skeletal formula

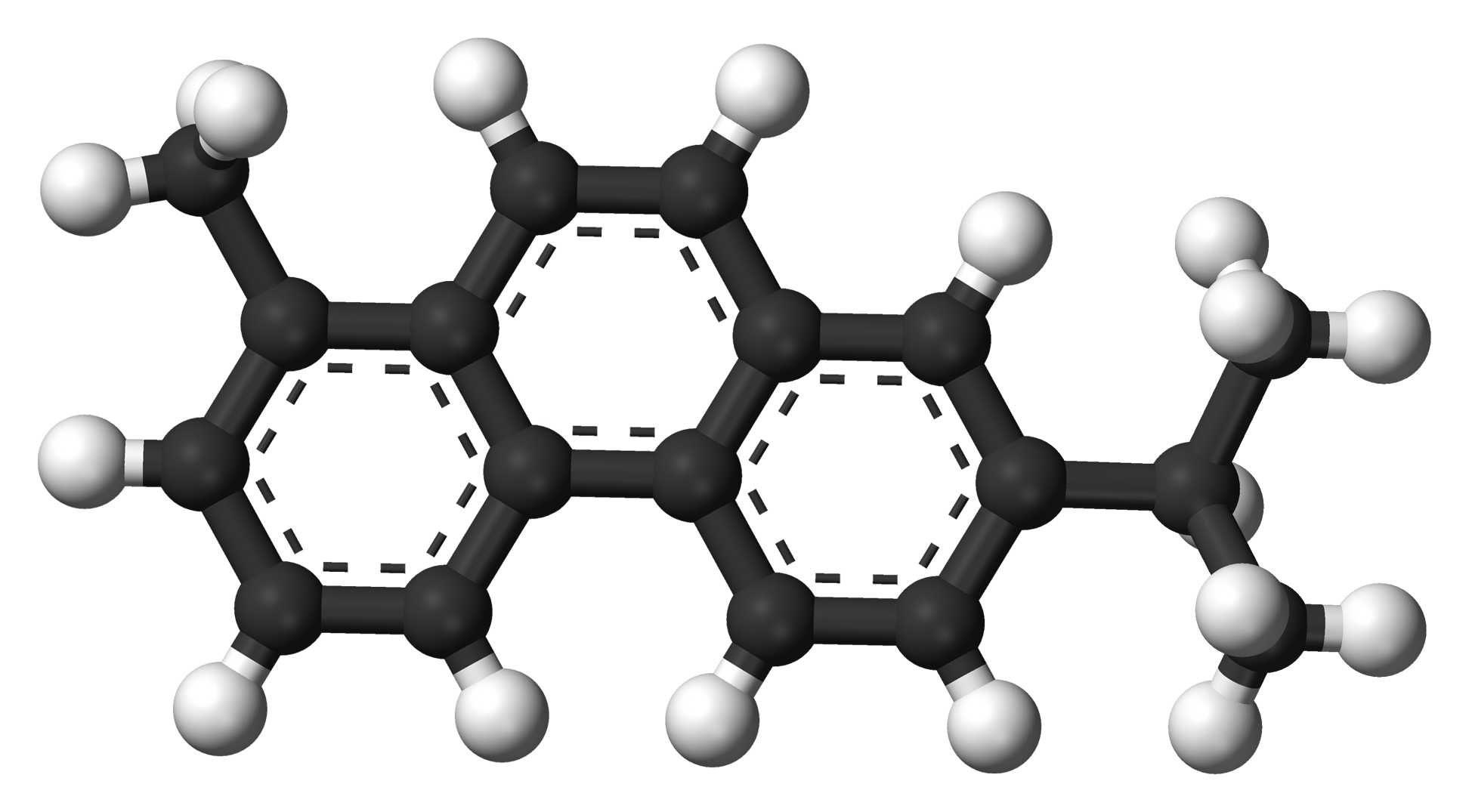
- Ball-and-stick model

Names
- Preferred IUPAC name 1-Methyl-7-(propan-2-yl)phenanthrene
- Other names Retene

Identifiers
CAS Number	483-65-8
3D model (JSmol)	Interactive image
ChemSpider	9805
ECHA InfoCard	100.006.908
EC Number	207-597-9
PubChem CID	10222
UNII	0W2D2E1P9Q
CompTox Dashboard (EPA)	DTXSID7058701
- InChI: InChI=1S/C18H18/c1-12(2)14-7-10-17-15(11-14)8-9-16-13(3)5-4-6-18(16)17/h4-12H,1-3H3 Key: NXLOLUFNDSBYTP-UHFFFAOYSA-N; InChI=1/C18H18/c1-12(2)14-7-10-17-15(11-14)8-9-16-13(3)5-4-6-18(16)17/h4-12H,1-3H3 Key: NXLOLUFNDSBYTP-UHFFFAOYAL
- SMILES: Cc1cccc3c1ccc2cc(C(C)C)ccc23

Properties
Chemical formula	C_{18}H_{18}
Molar mass	234.33552
Melting point	98.5 °C (209.3 °F; 371.6 K)
Boiling point	390 °C (734 °F; 663 K)
- Except where otherwise noted, data are given for materials in their standard state (at 25 °C [77 °F], 100 kPa). verify (what is ?) Infobox references

Retene, methyl isopropyl phenanthrene or 1-methyl-7-isopropyl phenanthrene, C_{18}H_{18}, is a polycyclic aromatic hydrocarbon present in the coal tar fraction, boiling above 360 °C. It occurs naturally in the tars obtained by the distillation of resinous woods. It crystallizes in large plates, which melt at 98.5 °C and boil at 390 °C. It is readily soluble in warm ether and in hot glacial acetic acid. Sodium and boiling amyl alcohol reduce it to a tetrahydroretene, but if it heated with phosphorus and hydriodic acid to 260 °C, a dodecahydride is formed. Chromic acid oxidizes it to retene quinone, phthalic acid and acetic acid. It forms a picrate that melts at 123-124 °C.

Retene is derived by degradation of specific diterpenoids biologically produced by conifer trees. The presence of traces of retene in the air is an indicator of forest fires; it is a major product of pyrolysis of conifer trees. It is also present in effluents from wood pulp and paper mills.

Retene, together with cadalene, simonellite and ip-iHMN, is a biomarker of vascular plants, which makes it useful for paleobotanic analysis of rock sediments. The ratio of retene/cadalene in sediments can reveal the ratio of the genus Pinaceae in the biosphere.

== Health effects ==
A recent study has shown retene, which is a component of the Amazonian organic PM10, is cytotoxic to human lung cells.
