= Tetsuo Nozoe =

Japanese organic chemist

- 野副 鉄男
- Born: May 16, 1902; Sendai, Japan
- Died: April 4, 1996 (aged 93); Tokyo, Japan
- Education: Tohoku University
- Known for: Hinokitiol
- Spouse: Kyoko Horiuchi
- Children: 4
- Scientific career
- Fields: Organic chemistry
- Workplaces: National Taiwan University; Tohoku University
- Academic advisors: Riko Majima

Tetsuo Nozoe (野副 鉄男, 16 May 1902 – 4 April 1996) was a Japanese organic chemist. He is known for the discovery of hinokitiol, a seven-membered aromatic compound, and studying non-benzenoid aromatic compounds.

== Early life and career ==
Tetsuo Nozoe was born on 16 May 1902 in Sendai to Juichi Nozoe, a lawyer and one-time member of the National Diet, and Toyo Nozoe. Tetsuo's family was Buddhist except of his mother who was a devout Christian. Tetsuo had three sisters and seven brothers, and he was the sixth child in the family. He started doing chemical experiments at home since his junior high school days. Although his parents wanted him to become a medical doctor, and even sent him for premedical classes, he proceeded his education with chemistry. After graduating from high school in Sendai, he entered the Department of Chemistry at Tohoku Imperial University in 1920. In university, he studied organic chemistry under Riko Majima, a leading scientist in organic chemistry in Japan.

In 1926, after graduation he moved to Taihoku, Formosa, where he started working as a researcher at the Camphor Research Laboratories of the Monopoly Bureau and then at the Department of Chemical Industry of the Central Research Institute, both under Government-General of Taipei. In Formosa, Tetsuo was studying the structures of natural compounds, such as saponins, sapogins, sapogenins, triterpenoids and glycosides, especially in plants found locally. In 1937, with the help of ultraviolet–visible spectroscopy he predicted the correct structures for oleanolic acid and hederagenin, common sapogenins. In the same year he became a professor of chemistry at Taihoku Imperial University. The scope of his research in those times included also studying constituents of wool wax and those of other animal skin waxes. He discovered lanolinic acids and agnolinic acids, groups of unusual branched chain fatty acids.

One of the most popular works of Tesuo Nozoe was the research on the chemical constituents of taiwanhinoki (Chamaecyparis taiwanensis, Taiwan cypress), a coniferous tree native to Taiwan. The natural resistance of this and other tree species belonging to Cupressaceae family to fungal wood decay prompted Japanese researchers to study the chemical components of these trees. Nenokichi Hirao, a Japanese chemist, derived a dark-red pigment from hinoki oil and called hinokitin in 1926. Tetso's research led to discovery of a new series of chemical compounds, non-benzoniod aromatic compounds, including hinokitiol. He obtained hinokitiol from hinokitin, and showed that hinokitin is an iron complex of hinokitiol, (C_{10}H_{11}O_{2})_{3}Fe. It was first published in 1936 in a special issue of the Bulletin of the Chemical Society of Japan. After three more years of work in Formosa following the World War II, Tetsuo returned to Japan. As a professor at Tohoku University, he continued his work on hinokitiol. Later in 1948, Holger Erdtman, a Scottish organic chemist, reported isolation of three isomeric monoterpenoids (α-, β-, and γ-thujaplicin) from Thuja plicata (Western red cedar) in his paper published in Nature. After correspondence, both Tetsuo and Holger found that hinokitiol is identical to β-thujaplicin and has a tropolone structure. Tetsuo Nozoe and Holger Erdtman became lifelong friends. In 1951, Nozoe got an opportunity to publish his work on hinokitiol and its derivatives in Nature. He also studied chemical characteristics of tropones, tropolones, other troponoids, and azulenes.

== Personal life ==
Tetsuo Nozoe was married to Kyoko Horiuchi and had four children – one son and three daughters. Tetsuo died of cancer on 4 April 1996.

He was collecting autographs and tributes from famous chemists all over the world, including at least 32 Nobel laureates, and had collected more than 4,000 signatures and comments in his note books. Tetsuo's autograph books, of 1,179 pages, are kept in the archives in Tohoku University.

His son Shigeo, daughter Yoko, grandson and granddaughters also studied chemistry. Shigeo Nozoe was also a professor of chemistry at Tokohu University.

== Awards and honors ==
- Order of the Sacred Treasure, 6th class (1940)
- Majima Award for Organic Chemistry of the Chemical Society of Japan (1944)
- Order of the Sacred Treasure, 5th class (1944)
- Order of the Sacred Treasure, 4th class (1945)
- Asahi Prize (1952)
- Japan Academy Award (1953)
- Order of Culture (1958)
- Person of Cultural Merit (1958)
- Dark-blue Ribbon Medal and Imperial Cup of the Government of Japan (1967)
- Order of the Sacred Treasure, 1st class (1972)
- Cultural Medal of the Republic of China (1979)
- August Wilhelm von Hofmann Memorial Medal of the German Chemical Society (1981)
- Special Award of the Society of Synthetic Organic Chemistry of Japan (1984)

=== Honorary membership ===
- Honorary Member, Chinese Chemical Society (1962)
- Foreign Member, Royal Swedish Academy of Sciences (1972)
- Honorary Member, Japan Pharmaceutical Association) (1973)
- Honorary Member, Chemical Society of Japan (1977)
- Honorary Member, Japan Society for Bioscience, Biotechnology, and Agrochemistry (1977)
- Honorary Member, Swiss Chemical Society (1977)
- Member, Japan Academy (1977)
- Honorary Member, Society of Synthetic Organic Chemistry of Japan (1990)

=== Honorary citizenship ===
- Honorary Citizen of Sendai (1959)
- Honorary Citizen of Taipei (1983)

== Selected bibliography ==
- Nozoe, T.; Takase, K.; Matsumura, H.; Asao, T.; Kikuchi, K.; Ito, S. (1961). Kotake, M. (ed.). Nonbenzenoid Aromatic Compunds. Dai-Yuki Kagaku. Vol. 13. Tokyo: Asakura Shoten. p. 691.
- Nozoe, Tetsuo (1974). Topics in nonbenzenoid aromatic chemistry. New York: Wiley. ISBN 978-0470651551.
- Nozoe, Tetsuo (1991). Seventy years in organic chemistry. Washington, DC: American Chemical Society. ISBN 0841217696.

== See also ==
- Hinokitiol
- Thujaplicin
- Tohoku Imperial University
