= Ralph Raphael =

British chemist

Ralph Raphael CBE FRS FRSE
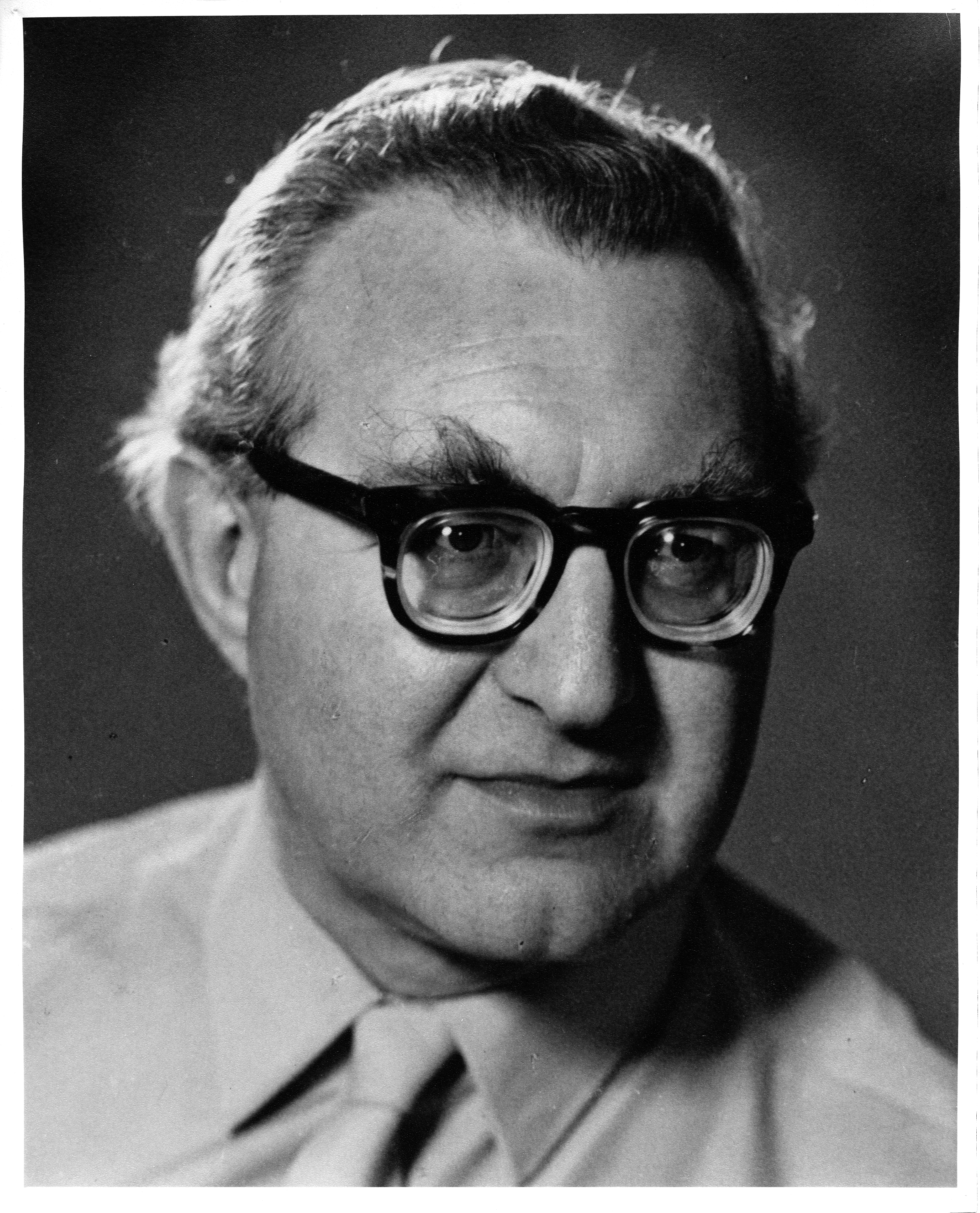
- Born: Ralph Alexander Raphael; 1 January 1921; Croydon, London, England
- Died: 27 April 1998 (aged 77); Cambridge, Cambridgeshire, England
- Education: Imperial College
- Known for: Acetylene chemistry, Organic synthesis
- Spouse: Prudence Maguerire Anne née Gaffikin
- Awards: Meldola Medal(1948); Tilden Medal (1960)
- Scientific career
- Fields: Organic Chemistry; Natural Products
- Workplaces: Imperial College; Glasgow University; Queen's University Belfast; Cambridge University
- Thesis: (1943)
- Doctoral advisors: Sir Ewart Jones; Sir Ian Heilbron

Ralph Alexander Raphael (1 January 1921 – 27 April 1998) was a British organic chemist, well known for his use of acteylene derivatives in the synthesis of natural products with biological activity.

== Early life and education ==
Ralph Raphael was born in Croydon, London on New Year's Day 1921, the son of master tailor Jacob ("Jack") Raphael (1889-1978) and his wife, Lily (née Woolf; 1892-1956). He attended secondary school at Wesley College, Dublin and then Tottenham County School, where a chemistry master, Edgar Ware, introduced him to the subject that would become Raphael's lifetime passion. In 1939 he won scholarships to study at Imperial College, graduating BSc with a first-class degree in 1941 and winning the Hofmann Prize for practical chemistry. During the Second World War both the undergraduate and PhD courses at Imperial College were of two years duration and Raphael completed the latter in 1943. His doctoral work, aimed at the synthesis of vitamin A, was published in five collaborative papers on the chemistry of acetylenes and that topic became a hallmark of his subsequent research career.

== Career ==
As a new PhD, Raphael was allocated to the wartime effort on the antibiotic penicillin, working from 1943 to 1946 at the May & Baker laboratories. After the war, he obtained an ICI fellowship (for 1946–1949) that allowed him to return to Imperial College to pursue independent research: an early highlight was his synthesises of penicillic acid, the major product of acid degradation of penicillin (although not containing its characteristic β-lactam substructure). Another was his collaboration with Franz Sondheimer on natural products including an insecticide extracted from Zanthoxylum clava-herculis (a diene then called herculin, now systematically named as (2E,8E)-N-isobutyl-2,8-dodecadienamide); work which led to Raphael's award of the Meldola Medal in 1948. In 1949, Raphael was appointed to his first permanent job, as a lecturer at Glasgow University. During this period he developed his teaching skills and his prodigious work rate can be judged by the fact that he also completed nine chapters in one volume of what would become a classic chemistry text. In 1954, Raphael moved to Queen's University, Belfast as its first Professor of Organic Chemistry. There he published an important book on acetylene chemistry, building on his broad experience of these compounds. In 1957, Raphael returned to the University of Glasgow as the Regius Professor of Chemistry, In 1960 he finished work on a text-book for undergraduates, which was updated and re-issued several times. In 1972 Raphael became head of the Department of Organic, Inorganic and Theoretical Chemistry at Cambridge University. This post had been made vacant by the retirement, on ill-health grounds, of Lord Todd, the previous holder of the 1702 Chair in Organic Chemistry. Raphael also became a Fellow of Christ's College. On retirement in 1988 he was granted emeritus status within his college and department, reflecting his distinguished service.

== Teaching and research ==
Despite having a slight stammer, Professor Raphael was an inspiring lecturer who engaged his undergraduate students with up-to-date material on organic chemistry, based on his extensive knowledge of the current literature. He had an excellent sense of humour, illustrated by Dudley Williams's report that

"he delivered spoof lectures. One on the synthesis of catenanes began with serious chemistry and gradually — imperceptibly — became less credible; it culminated in the description of their absorption spectra in the audible region"

The output of Raphael's own work and that of his research group of postgraduate and postdoctoral students was published in over 150 peer-reviewed articles.

Raphael was funded by external grants, including those from the SERC, NRC Canada, Glaxo Smith Kline, Hoffmann-La Roche and ICI, for whom he was a retained consultant. He also consulted for Beecham Group, Chiroscience and Fisons. His consultancy and other work led to a number of patent filings.

=== Synthesis of natural products ===
Raphael studied many natural products, especially of the type that were biologically active and which would provide a challenge for synthesis but might be the realistic target of a single PhD student's thesis. He and his students published syntheses of 2-deoxyribose, aaptamine, aphidicolin, apiose, arachidonic acid, arcyriaflavin B, baikiain, bullatenone, chrysanthemic acid, clovene, cordycepose, cuparene, erythrulose, exaltolide, farnesiferol C, geiparvarin, gibberone, histamine, linoleic acid, linolenic acid, lipoic acid, pseudomonic acid, pyrenophorin, Queen bee acid, shikimic acid, staurosporinone, strigol, steganacin, steganone, trichodermin and virantmicin. Raphael also investigated the composition of the wax coating of plant leaves, describing the hydrocarbons of which they are composed. In another intriguing publication in Nature, Raphael collaborated with David Rubio to identify components used in the surface treatment of the wood of stringed instruments made by Stradivarius in Cremona and showed that a version of these substances could be used to improve the tone of modern instruments.

=== Molecules of theoretical interest ===
Raphael was interested in molecules of theoretical, as well as practical, interest. In 1951, co-worked and co-authored with J. W. Cook and A. I. Scott, he published the first synthesis of the quasi-aromatic compound tropolone and the thujaplicin natural products which contained this unusual ring system. His interest in acetylenes led him to study macrocyclic compounds containing this functional group, and bridged ring systems that could be derived from them. Before the first synthesis by Ralph Raphael, thujaplicins had been naturally isolated from Chamaecyparis taiwanensis by Tetsuo Nozoe in 1936 (the β-isomer; hinokitiol), and from Thuja plicata independently by Holger Erdtman in 1948 (all three isomers; α-, β- and γ-thujaplicins).

== Honours, awards and service to the scientific community ==
In 1958 Raphael was elected a Fellow of the Royal Society of Edinburgh. His proposers were John Monteath Robertson, James Norman Davidson, Robert Campbell Garry, and Guido Pontecorvo. In 1962 he was also elected a Fellow of the Royal Society of London; he was the Davy Medalist for the latter in 1981. He was appointed a CBE in the 1982 Birthday Honours.

Raphael received Honorary Doctorates from his alma mater Imperial College, in 1991, Stirling University in 1982, the University of East Anglia in 1986, and Queen's University Belfast in 1989, Among his many awards and service to learned bodies were:

- Meldola Medal and Prize (1948)
- Tilden Medal (1960)
- Vice-President of the Chemical Society, London (1967-1970)
- Chemistry Committee Member of SRC (1968)
- Pedler Award (1973)
- Ciba-Geigy Sponsored Award for Synthetic Chemistry (1975)
- Member of the Council of the Royal Society (1975-1977)
- President of the Perkin Division of the Royal Society of Chemistry (1979-1981)
- Visiting Professor, Hebrew University of Jerusalem (1981)
- Honorary membership of the Royal Irish Academy (1987)
- Visiting Professor, University of Hong Kong (1989)
- Visiting Professor, Université of Haute Alsace (1990)

== Personal life ==
In 1944 Raphael married Prudence Maguerire Anne née Gaffikin, who was a professional violin and viola player. They had a son, Tony, and a daughter, Sonia. By 1998 there were two grandchildren and a great-granddaughter. Ralph Raphael was keenly interested in the visual and performing arts, becoming a member of the Scientific Advisory Committee of the National Gallery in 1986; his favourite pastime was contract bridge. Raphael died of ischaemic heart disease, in Cambridge on 27 April 1998.

Academic offices
Preceded by J W Cook (1939-1955); Sir Derek Barton (1955-1957)	Regius Professor of Chemistry, Glasgow; 1957 - 1972	Succeeded by Gordon Kirby
