= Thujaplicin =

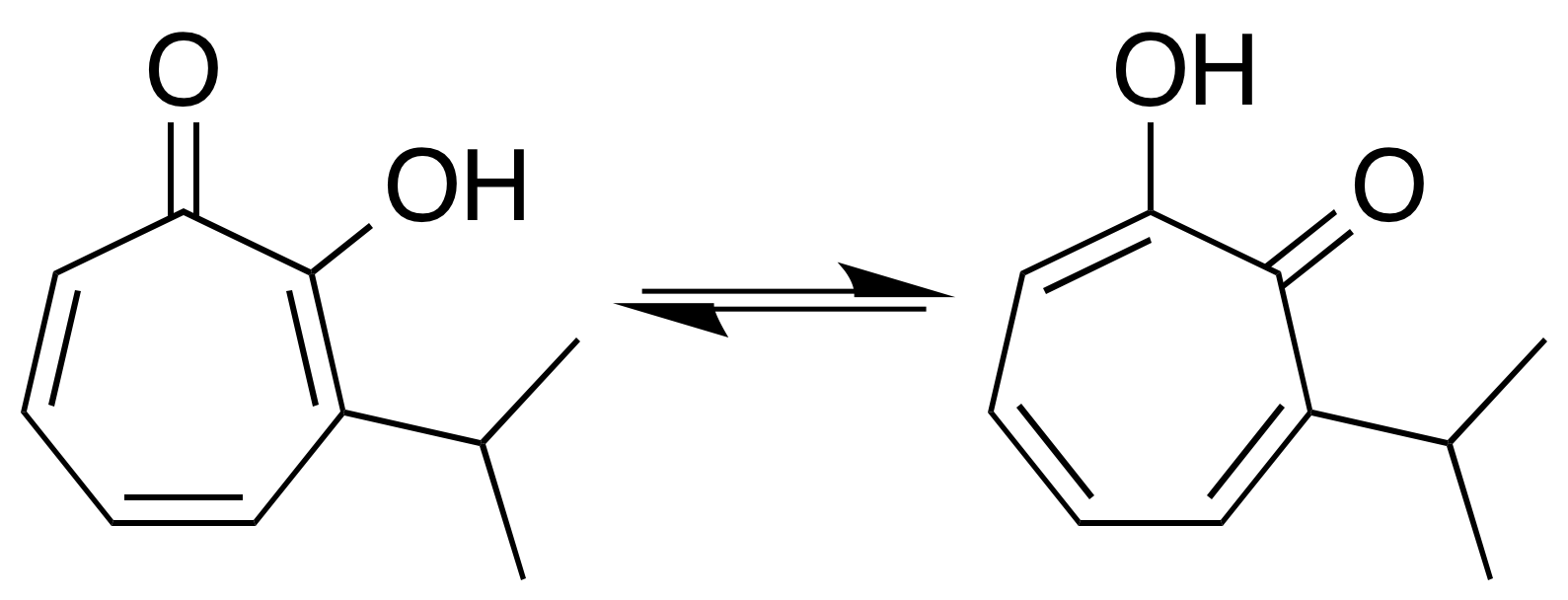
- α-Thujaplicin

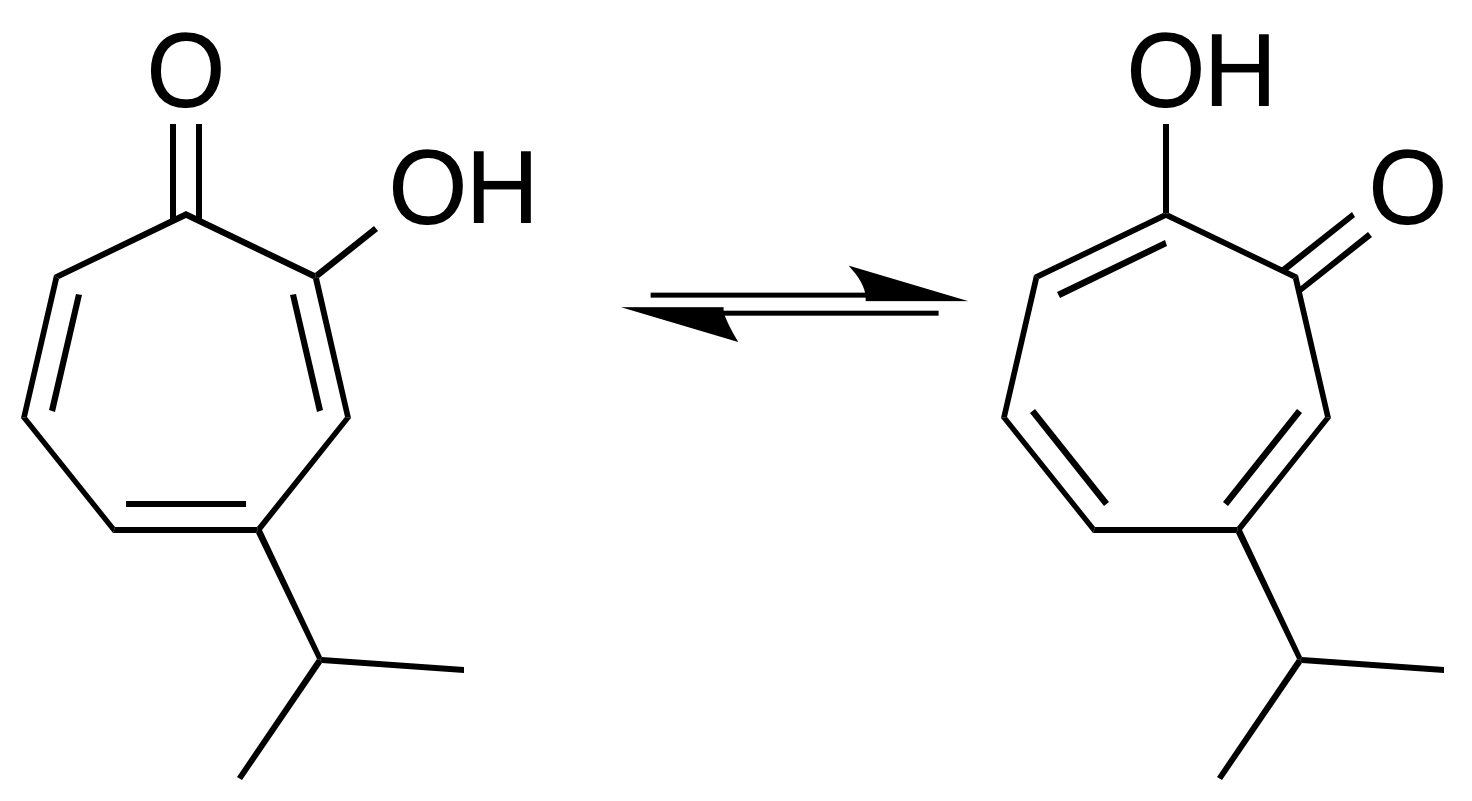
- β-Thujaplicin (hinokitiol)

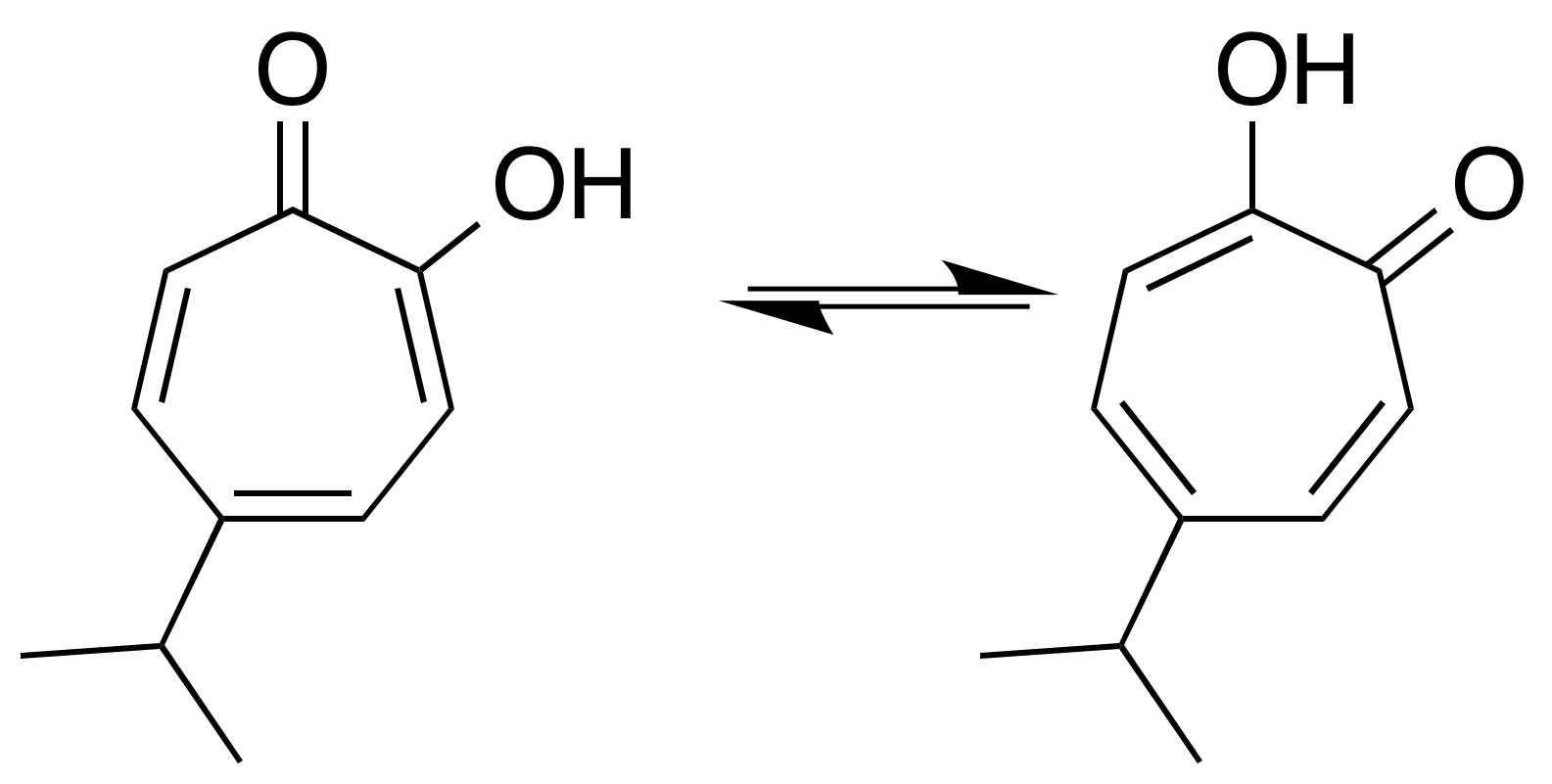
- γ-Thujaplicin

Identifiers
CAS Number	α: 1946-74-3; β: 499-44-5; γ: 672-76-4
3D model (JSmol)	α: Interactive image; β: Interactive image; γ: Interactive image
ChEBI	β: CHEBI:10447; γ: CHEBI:10578
ChEMBL	α: ChEMBL1275969; β: ChEMBL48310
ChemSpider	12128; α: 72538; β: 3485
EC Number	β: 207-880-7
PubChem CID	α: 80297; β: 3611; γ: 12649
UNII	β: U5335D6EBI; γ: CA2K6LJ2BV
CompTox Dashboard (EPA)	α: DTXSID70173098; β: DTXSID6043911; γ: DTXSID2060969
- InChI: α: InChI=1S/C10H12O2/c1-7(2)8-5-3-4-6-9(11)10(8)12/h3-7H,1-2H3,(H,11,12) Key: TUFYVOCKVJOUIR-UHFFFAOYSA-N; β: InChI=1S/C10H12O2/c1-7(2)8-4-3-5-9(11)10(12)6-8/h3-7H,1-2H3,(H,11,12) Key: FUWUEFKEXZQKKA-UHFFFAOYSA-N; γ: InChI=1S/C10H12O2/c1-7(2)8-3-5-9(11)10(12)6-4-8/h3-7H,1-2H3,(H,11,12) Key: WKEWHSLZDDZONF-UHFFFAOYSA-N
- SMILES: α: CC(C)C1=C(C(=O)C=CC=C1)O; β: CC(C)C1=CC(=O)C(=CC=C1)O; γ: CC(C)C1=CC=C(C(=O)C=C1)O

Properties
Chemical formula	C_{10}H_{12}O_{2}
Molar mass	164.204 g·mol^{−1}
- Except where otherwise noted, data are given for materials in their standard state (at 25 °C [77 °F], 100 kPa). Infobox references

Thujaplicin (isopropyl cycloheptatrienolone) is any of three isomeric tropolone-related natural products that have been isolated from the softwoods of the trees of Cupressaceae family. These compounds are known for their antibacterial, antifungal, and antioxidant properties. They were the first natural tropolones to be made synthetically.

== History ==
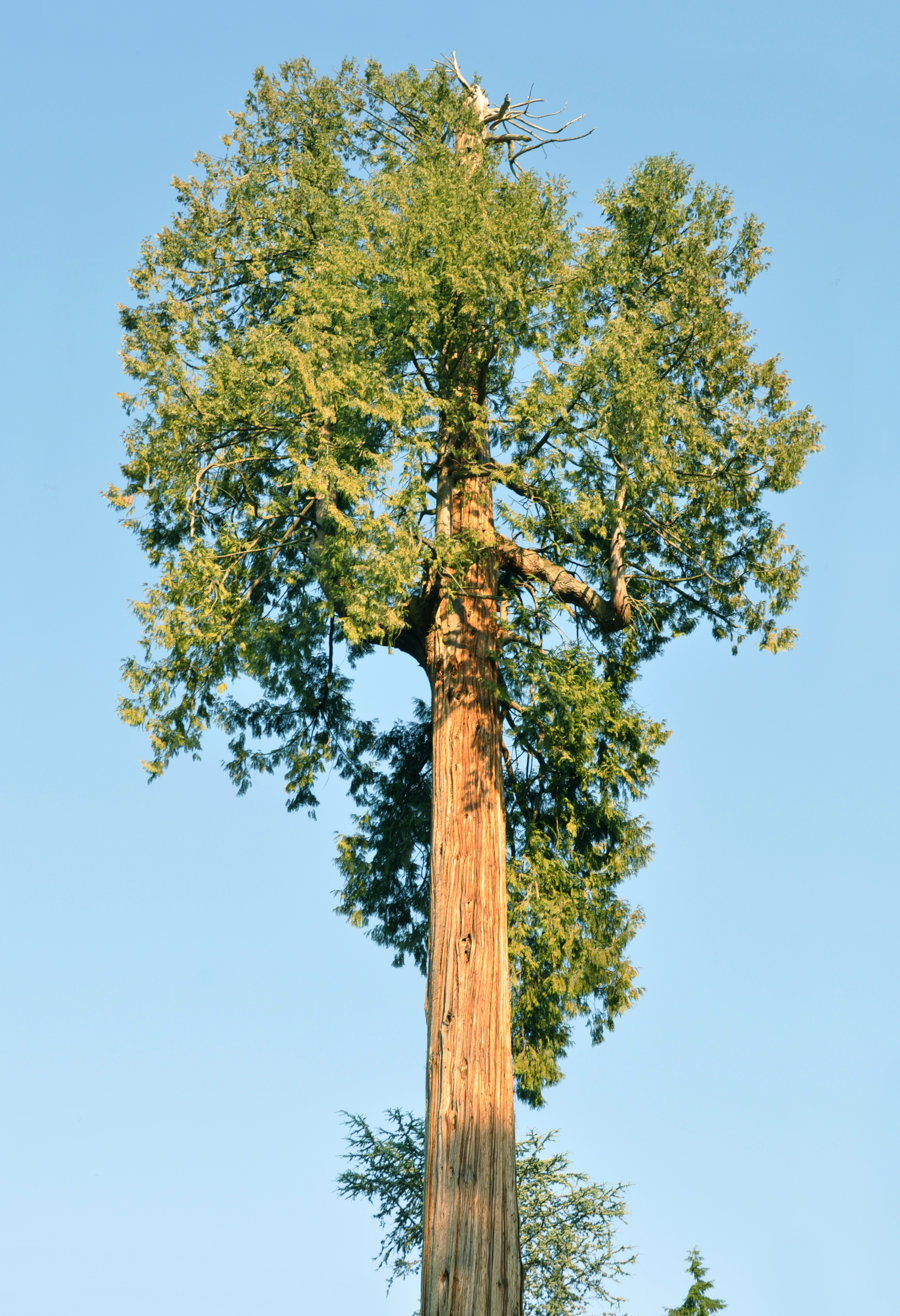
Thuja plicata Donn ex D. Don (Western red cedar) – a tree belonging to the Cupressaceae family from which thujaplicins were first purified

Thujaplicins were discovered in the mid-1930s and purified from the heartwood of Thuja plicata Donn ex D. Don, commonly called as Western red cedar tree. These compounds were also identified in the constituents of Chamaecyparis obtusa, another species from the Cupressaceae family. C. obtusa is native to East Asian countries including Japan and Taiwan, and is also known as Taiwan hinoki, from which the β-thujaplicin was first isolated in 1936 and received its name, hinokitiol. Thujaplicins were the first natural tropolones to be made synthetically, by Ralph Raphael and colleagues, and the β-thujaplicin was the first non-benzenoid aromatic compound identified, by Tetsuo Nozoe and colleagues. The resistance of the heartwood of the tree to decay was the main reason prompting to investigate its content and identify the compounds responsible for antimicrobial properties. β-thujaplicin gained more scientific interest beginning in the 2000s. Later, iron-binding activity of β-thujaplicin was discovered and the molecule has been ironically nicknamed as “Iron Man molecule”, because the first name of Tetsuo Nozoe can be translated into English as “Iron Man”.

== Occurrence and isolation ==
Tjujaplicins are found in the heartwood of the conifer trees belonging to the Cupressaceae family, including Chamaecyparis obtusa (Hinoki cypress), Thuja plicata (Western red cedar), Thujopsis dolabrata var. hondai (Hinoki asunaro), Juniperus cedrus (Canary Islands juniper), Cedrus atlantica (Atlas cedar), Cupressus lusitanica (Mexican white cedar), Chamaecyparis lawsoniana (Port Orford cedar), Chamaecyparis taiwanensis (Taiwan cypress), Chamaecyparis thyoides (Atlantic white cedar), Cupressus arizonica (Arizona cypress), Cupressus macnabiana (MacNab cypress), Cupressus macrocarpa (Monterey cypress), Juniperus chinensis (Chinese juniper), Juniperus communis (Common juniper), Juniperus californica (California juniper), Juniperus occidentalis (Western juniper), Juniperus oxycedrus (Cade), Juniperus sabina (Savin juniper), Calocedrus decurrens (California incense-cedar), Calocedrus formosana (Taiwan incense-cedar), Platycladus orientalis (Chinese thuja), Thuja occidentalis (Northern white-cedar), Thuja standishii (Japanese thuja), Tetraclinis articulata (Sandarac).

Thujaplicins can be produced in plant cell suspension cultures, or can be extracted from wood using solvents and ultrasonication.

== Biosynthesis ==
Thujaplicins can be synthesized by cycloaddition of isopropylcyclopentadiene and dichloroketene, 1,3-dipolar cycloaddition of 5-isopropyl-1-methyl-3-oxidopyridinium, ring expansion of 2-isopropylcyclohexanone, regiocontrolled hydroxylation of oxyallyl (4+3) cycloadducts, from (R)-(+)-limonene regioselectively by several steps, and from troponeirontricarbonyl complex by few steps. The synthesis pathway of β-thujaplicin from troponeirontricarbonyl complex is found below:

The synthesis pathway of β-thujaplicin by electro-reductive alkylation of substituted cycloheptatrienes is shown below:

The synthesis pathway of β-thujaplicin through ring expansion of 2-isopropylcyclohexanone is shown below:

The synthesis pathway of β-thujaplicin through oxyallyl cation [4+3] cyclization (Noyori's synthesis) is shown below:

== Chemistry ==
Thujaplicins belong to tropolones containing an unsaturated seven-membered carbon ring. Thujaplicins are monoterpenoids that are cyclohepta-2,4,6-trien-1-one substituted by a hydroxy group at position 2 and an isopropyl group at positions 3, 4 or 5. These compounds are enols and cyclic ketones. They derive from a hydride of a cyclohepta-1,3,5-triene. Thujaplicins are soluble in organic solvents and aqueous buffers. Hinokitiol is soluble in ethanol, dimethyl sulfoxide, dimethylformamide with a solubility of 20, 30 and 12.5 mg/ml, respectively. β-thujaplicin provides acetone on vigorous oxidation and gives the saturated monocyclic diol upon catalytic hydrogenation. It is stable to alkali and acids, forming salts or remaining unchanged, but does not convert to catechol derivatives. The complexes made of iron and tropolones display high thermodynamic stability and has shown to have a stronger binding constant than the transferrin-iron complex.

There are three isomers of thujaplicin, with the isopropyl group positioned progressively further from the two oxygen atoms around the ring: α-thujaplicin, β-thujaplicin, and γ-thujaplicin. β-Thujaplicin, also called hinokitiol, is the most common in nature. Each exists in two tautomeric forms, swapping the hydroxyl hydrogen to the other oxygen, meaning the two oxygen substituents do not have distinct "carbonyl" vs "hydroxyl" identities. The extent of this exchange is that the tropolone ring is aromatic with an overall cationic nature, and the oxygen–hydrogen–oxygen region has an anionic nature.

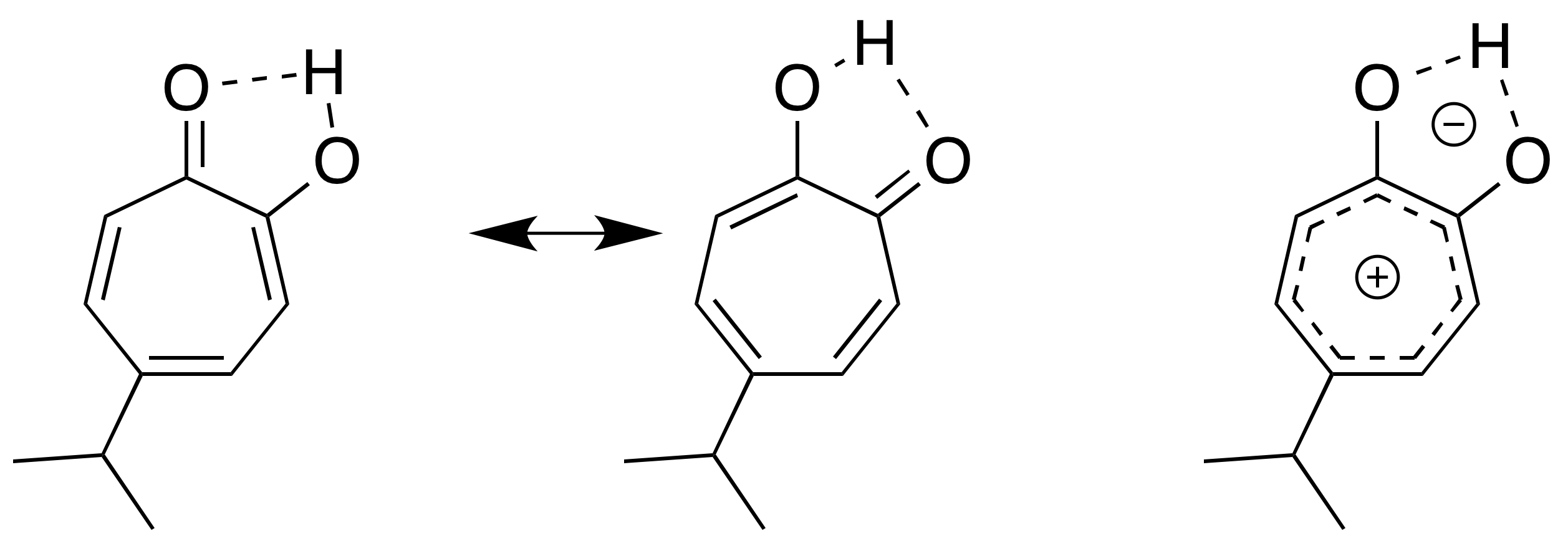

== Biological properties ==
=== Insecticidal and pesticidal activity ===
Thujaplicins are shown to act against Reticulitermes speratus (Japanese termites), Coptotermes formosanus (super termites), Dermatophagoides farinae (dust mites), Tyrophagus putrescentiae (mould mites), Callosobruchus chinensis (adzuki bean weevil), Lasioderma serricorne (cigarette beetle).

Hinokitiol has also shown some larvicidal activities against Aedes aegypti (yellow fever mosquito) and Culex pipiens (common house mosquito), and anti-plasmodial activities against Plasmodium falciparum and Plasmodium berghei.

=== Chelating and ionophore activity ===
Thujaplicins, as other tropolones, demonstrate chelating activity, acting as an ionophore by binding different metal ions.

=== Anti-browning activity ===
Tropolone and thujaplicins exhibit potent suppressive activity on enzymatic browning due to inhibition of polyphenol oxidase and tyrosinase. This have been shown in experiments on different vegetables, fruits, mushrooms, plants and other agricultural products. Prevention of darkening has also been elicited on seafood products.

== Applications ==
=== Skin care and cosmetics ===
Owing to their antibacterial activities against various microbes colonizing and affecting the skin, thujaplicins, including also thujaplicinol, are used in skin care and hair growth products, and are especially popular in Eastern Asia.

=== Oral care ===
Hinokitiol is used in various oral care products, including toothpastes and oral sprays.

=== Veterinary medicine ===
Due to its antifungal activity against Malassezia pachydermatis, it is used in eardrop formulations for external otitis in dogs.

=== Agriculture ===
Considering their antifungal activity against many plant-pathogenic fungi, and pesticidal and insecticidal properties, the role of thujaplicins in agriculture is evolving, including their use in the management of different plant diseases and for controlling the postharvest decay.

=== Food additive ===
Thujaplicins are used as food additives in Japan. Due to its suppressive activity on food browning and the inhibitory activity against bacteria and fungi causing food spoilage (such as Clostridium perfringens, Alternaria alternata, Aspergillus niger, Botrytis cinerea, Fusobacterium species, Monilinia fructicola and Rhizopus stolonifer), hinokitiol is also used in food packaging as a shelf-life extending agent. Thujaplicinol, a tropolone, is also used in Japan as a food additive in small amount.

== See also ==
- Thujaplicinol
