= Ted Corbett (chemist) =

New Zealand chemist (1923–2018)

- Born: Robert Edward Corbett; 13 June 1923
- Died: 3 February 2018 (aged 94); Tauranga, New Zealand
- Education: University of Otago (MSc); University of Cambridge (PhD)
- Spouse: Enid Mary Carter (m. 1949; died 2012)
- Children: 2
- Scientific career
- Fields: Organic and natural product chemistry
- Workplaces: University of Otago
- Thesis: The structure of certain antibiotics (1950)
- Doctoral advisor: Alexander Todd

Robert Edward Corbett (13 June 1923 – 3 February 2018) was a New Zealand organic chemist. He is noted for his contribution to natural product chemistry through the isolation and structural elucidation of compounds from New Zealand native plants.

== Early life and education ==
Born on 13 June 1923, Corbett was the son of Walter Corbett and Margaret Whitehead Corbett (née Robertson). He studied at the University of Otago, graduating Master of Science with first-class honours in chemistry in 1945. Corbett later undertook doctoral studies at the University of Cambridge under Alexander Todd on the structures of some of the metabolites—puberulic acid, puberulonic acid, and stipitatic acid—of Penicillium species. He showed that they contain the tropolone skeleton, and his PhD thesis, titled The structure of certain antibiotics was completed in 1950.

In 1949, Corbett married Enid Mary Carter in Cambridge, England, and they went on to have two children.

== Academic and research career ==
In 1945, Corbett was appointed as a lecturer in chemistry at Otago. After returning from Cambridge in 1950, Corbett rose to become a professor in 1966, and the Mellor Professor of Chemistry in 1972. When he retired in 1983, he was accorded the title of professor emeritus.

Corbett's research at Otago was primarily concerned with the study and structural elucidation of essential oils isolated from New Zealand native plants by steam distillation. Under his supervision in 1970, doctoral student Denis Lauren first isolated the diterpene compound from the rimu tree (Dacrydium cupressinum) that came to be known as laurenene. Corbett also investigated extractives from barks, leaves, heartwoods and lichens, and determined the structures of many new, and derivatives of known, di-, tri- and sesquiterpenoids. He also studied the synthesis and rearrangement of some of the compounds that his team isolated.

== Later life and death ==
In retirement, the Corbetts lived in Tauranga. Enid Corbett died there in 2012, and Ted Corbett died on 3 February 2018, also in Tauranga.

== Honours and awards ==
In 1972, Corbett was elected a Fellow of the Royal Society of New Zealand. He was also a Fellow of the New Zealand Institute of Chemistry.

== Selected publications ==
- Corbett, R.E.; Hassall, C.H.; Johnson, A.W.; Todd, A.R. (1950). "Puberulic and puberulonic acids. Part I. The molecular formula of puberulonic acid and consideration of possible benzenoid structures for the acids". Journal of the Chemical Society: 1–6. doi:10.1039/JR9500000001.
- Corbett, R.E.; Wyllie, S.G. (1966). "The structure of rimuene". Journal of the Chemical Society C: Organic: 1737–1742. doi:10.1039/J39660001737.
- Corbett, R. Edward; Lauren, Denis R.; Weavers, Rex T. (1979). "The structure of laurenene, a new diterpene from the essential oil of Dacrydium cupressinum. Part 1". Journal of the Chemical Society, Perkin Transactions 1: 1774–1790. doi:10.1039/P19790001774.
