= Hinokitiol =

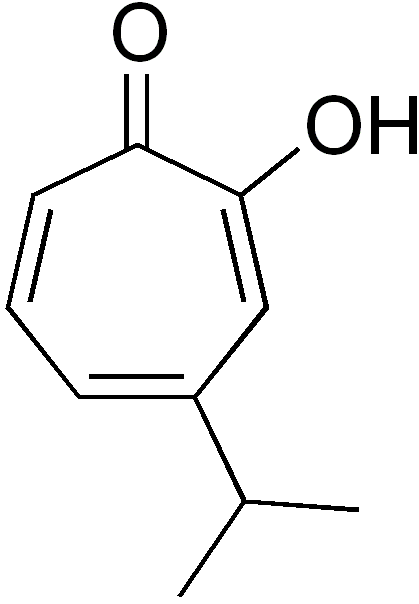

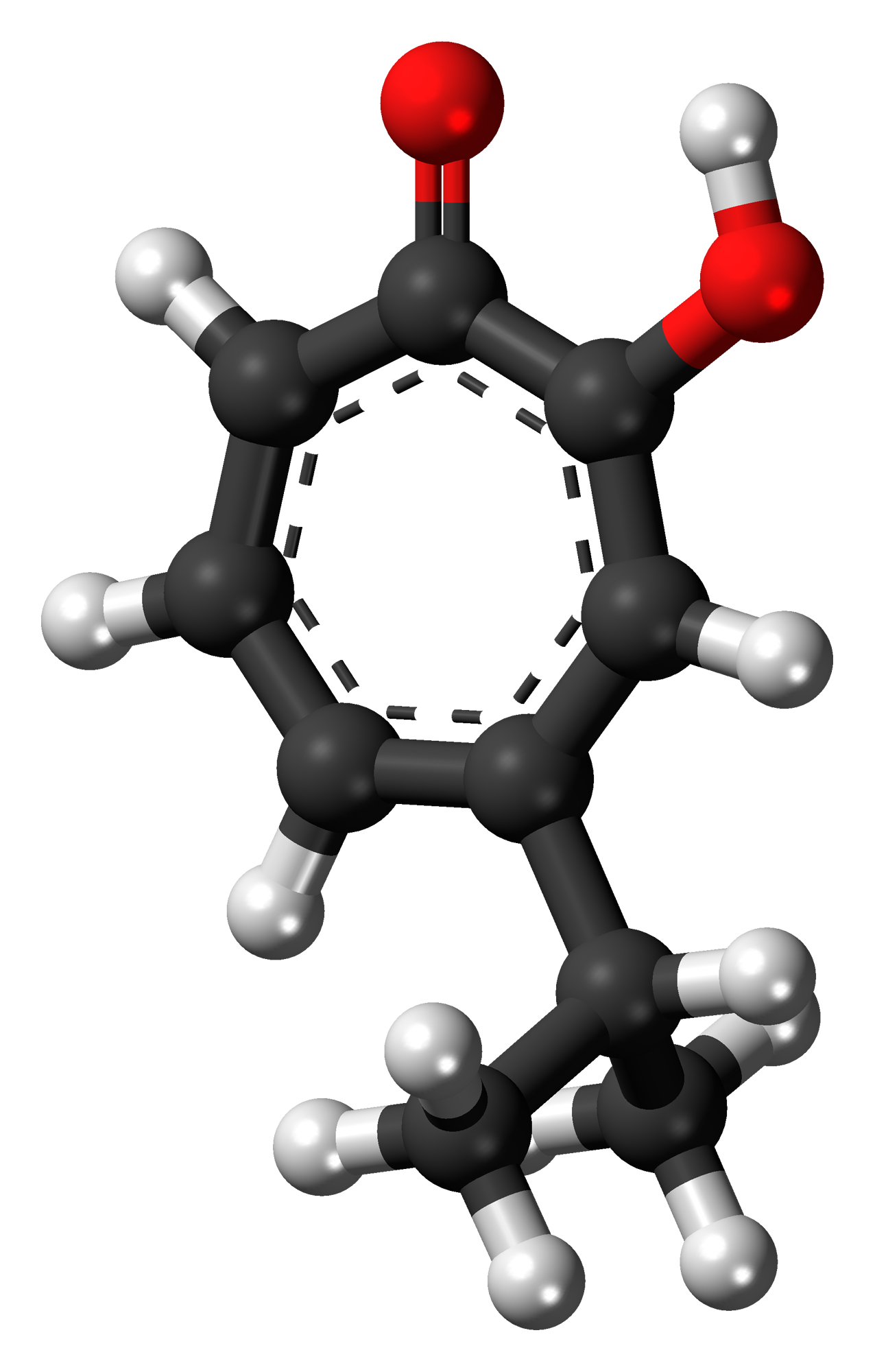

Names
- Preferred IUPAC name 2-Hydroxy-4-(propan-2-yl)cyclohepta-2,4,6-trien-1-one
- Other names β-Thujaplicin; 4-Isopropyltropolone

Identifiers
CAS Number	499-44-5
3D model (JSmol)	Interactive image
ChEBI	CHEBI:10447
ChEMBL	ChEMBL48310
ChemSpider	3485
ECHA InfoCard	100.007.165
KEGG	D04876
PubChem CID	3611
UNII	U5335D6EBI
CompTox Dashboard (EPA)	DTXSID6043911
- InChI: InChI=1S/C10H12O2/c1-7(2)8-4-3-5-9(11)10(12)6-8/h3-7H,1-2H3,(H,11,12) Key: FUWUEFKEXZQKKA-UHFFFAOYSA-N
- SMILES: O=C1/C=C(\C=C/C=C1/O)C(C)C

Properties
Chemical formula	C_{10}H_{12}O_{2}
Molar mass	164.204 g·mol^{−1}
Appearance	Colorless to pale yellow crystals
Melting point	50 to 52 °C (122 to 126 °F; 323 to 325 K)
Boiling point	140 °C (284 °F; 413 K) at 10 mmHg
Solubility in water	1.2 g/L (0 °C)
Solubility in ethanol	20 g/L
Solubility in dimethyl sulfoxide	30 g/L
Solubility in dimethylformamide	12.5 g/L

Hazards
Flash point	140 °C (284 °F; 413 K)
- Except where otherwise noted, data are given for materials in their standard state (at 25 °C [77 °F], 100 kPa). verify (what is ?) Infobox references

Hinokitiol (β-thujaplicin) is a natural monoterpenoid found in the wood of trees in the family Cupressaceae. It is a tropolone derivative and one of the thujaplicins. Hinokitiol is used in oral and skin care products, and is a food additive used in Japan.

== History ==
Hinokitiol was discovered by a Japanese chemist Tetsuo Nozoe in 1936. It was isolated from the essential oil component of the heartwood Taiwanese hinoki, from which the compound ultimately adopted its name. Hinokitiol is the first non-benzenoid aromatic compound identified. The compound has a heptagonal molecular structure and was first synthesized by Ralph Raphael in 1951. Due to its iron-chelating activity, hinokitiol has been called an "Iron Man molecule" in the scientific media, which is ironic because Tetsuo is translated into English as "Iron Man". Taiwanese hinoki is native to East Asian countries, particularly to Japan and Taiwan. Hinokitiol has also been found in other trees of the Cupressaceae family, including Thuja plicata Donn ex D. Don which is common in the Pacific Northwest.

Woods that are rich in hinokitiol were used by people of ancient Japan for creating long-standing buildings, such as the Konjiki-dō, a Japanese national treasure, one of the buildings of Chūson-ji complex, a temple in Iwate Prefecture. It kept it from harm against insects, wood-rotting fungi, and molds for a long time of about 840 years. Additionally, there are some old famous Buddhist temples and Shinto shrines using trees, later known to contain hinokitiol. Beginning in the 2000s, the biological properties of hinokitiol have become of research interest, focusing on its biological properties. And the resistance of cypress trees to wood decay was the leading reason prompting to study their chemical content and to find the substances responsible for those properties.

== Natural occurrence ==
Hinokitiol has been found in the heartwood of the conifer trees of the Cupressaceae family, including Chamaecyparis obtusa (Hinoki cypress), Thuja plicata (Western red cedar), Thujopsis dolabrata var. hondai (Hinoki asunaro), Juniperus cedrus (Canary Islands juniper), Cedrus atlantica (Atlas cedar), Cupressus lusitanica (Mexican white cedar), Chamaecyparis lawsoniana (Port Orford cedar), Chamaecyparis taiwanensis (Taiwan cypress), Chamaecyparis thyoides (Atlantic white cedar), Cupressus arizonica (Arizona cypress), Cupressus macnabiana (MacNab cypress), Cupressus macrocarpa (Monterey cypress), Juniperus chinensis (Chinese juniper), Juniperus communis (Common juniper), Juniperus californica (California juniper), Juniperus occidentalis (Western juniper), Juniperus oxycedrus (Cade), Juniperus sabina (Savin juniper), Calocedrus decurrens (California incense-cedar), Calocedrus formosana (Taiwan incense-cedar), Platycladus orientalis (Chinese thuja), Thuja occidentalis (Northern white-cedar), Thuja standishii (Japanese thuja), Tetraclinis articulata (Sandarac).

Its concentration in the trees are 0.1-0.2% in Chamaecyparis taiwanensis (2 mg of hinokitiol per 1 g of dry sawdust), 0.04% in Juniperus cedrus and Thujopsis dolabrata var. hondai (0.4 mg of hinokitiol per 1 g of dry sawdust), and 0.02% in Chamaecyparis obtusa (0.2 mg of hinokitiol per 1 g of dry sawdust).

There are three naturally found thujaplicins: α-thujaplicin, β-thujaplicin (hinokitiol) and γ-thujaplicin. Hinokitiol is the most common isomer and it appears to be the only isomer that exerts all biological activities attributed to thujaplicins.

== Chemical synthesis ==
There are different pathways to synthesize thujaplicins. Hinokitiol, as other thujaplicins, can be synthesized by cycloaddition of isopropylcyclopentadiene and dichloro ketene, 1,3-dipolar cycloaddition of 5-isopropyl-1-methyl-3-oxidopyridinium, ring expansion of 2-isopropylcyclohexanone, regiocontrolled hydroxylation of oxyallyl (4+3) cycloadducts, regioselectively from (R)-(+)-limonene, and from troponeirontricarbonyl complex. Hinokitiol can also be isolated through plant cell suspension cultures, or readily extracted from the wood with chemical solvents and ultrasonication.

(1) Synthesis of hinokitiol from troponeirontricarbonyl complex:

(2) Synthesis of hinokitiol by electro-reductive alkylation of substituted cycloheptatrienes:

(3) Synthesis of hinokitiol through ring expansion of 2-isopropylcyclohexanone:

(4) Synthesis of hinokitiol through oxyallyl cation [4+3] cyclization (Noyori's synthesis):

== Chemistry ==
Hinokitiol is a tropolone derivative containing an unsaturated seven-membered carbon ring. It is a monoterpenoid – cyclohepta-2,4,6-trien-1-one substituted by a hydroxy group at position 2 and an isopropyl group at position 4. It is a enol and a cyclic ketone. It derives from a hydride of a cyclohepta-1,3,5-triene. Thujaplicins are soluble in organic solvents and aqueous buffers. Hinokitiol provides acetone on vigorous oxidation and gives the saturated monocyclic diol upon catalytic hydrogenation. It is stable to alkali and acids, forming salts or remaining unchanged, but does not convert to catechol derivatives. Hinokitiol, as other thujaplicins and tropolones, reversibly binds metal ions. It forms complex salts with metal ions.

=== Ionophore ===
Hinokitiol, as other tropolones, reversibly binds metal ions (i.e. Zn^{2+}, Fe^{2+}, Cu^{2+}, Co^{2+}, Mn^{2+}, Ag^{2+}) and form complex salts. It is considered as a broad-spectrum metallophore, and an efficient iron-chelating agent. The iron complex with hinokitiol with the formula (C_{10}H_{11}O_{2})_{3}Fe is called hinokitin. Hinoki oil is rich in hinokitin which has an appearance of dark red crystals. The complexes made of iron and tropolones display high thermodynamic stability and has shown to have a stronger binding constant than the transferrin-iron complex. It is believed that metal-binding activity may be the principal mechanism of action underlying the most part of its biological activities, especially binding iron, zinc, and copper ions. By binding different metal ions and serving as an ionophore, it accelerates the intracellular uptake of those ions and increases their intracellular levels, thus influencing on different biological activities. It is shown that a synergistic effect in some biological activities and settings may occur when ionophores are combined with the ions they bind. As an ionophore, its molecule has an hydrophilic center and a hydrophobic part. The hydrophobic part interacts with biological membranes. The hydrophilic center binds metal ions and form ionophore-ion complexes.

== Biological properties ==
Hinokitiol and other thujaplicins have been mainly investigated in in-vitro studies and animal models for their possible biological properties, such as antimicrobial, antifungal, antiviral, antiproliferative, anti-inflammatory, antiplasmodial effects. However, no evidence exists from clinical studies to support these findings. It has also shown to have insecticidal, pesticidal and antibrowning effects. The vast majority of these properties are thought to be due to the metal ion-binding activity. Hinokitiol appeared to exert all in-vitro activities attributed to thujaplicins.

Hinokitiol has been shown to possess inhibitory effects on Chlamydia trachomatis and may be clinically useful as a topical drug.

=== Safety ===
The safety of hinokitiol has been tested in rats and no carcinogenic effect to rats was found. In 2006, hinokitiol was categorized under the Domestic substances list (DSL) in Canada as non-persistent, non-bioaccumulative and non-toxic to aquatic organisms.

== Uses ==
=== Skin and oral care products ===
Hinokitiol is used in a range of consumer products intended for skin care, such as soaps, skin lotions, eyelid cleanser, shampoos and hair tonics; for oral care, such as toothpastes, breath sprays.

In April 2020, Advance Nanotek, an Australian producer of zinc oxide, filed a joint patent application with AstiVita Limited, for an anti-viral composition that included oral care products.

=== Insect repellent ===
Hinokitiol is found to have insecticidal and pesticidal activities against crop-damaging termites (Reticulitermes speratus, Coptotermes formosanus) and beetles (Lasioderma serricorne, Callosobruchus chinensis). It has also shown to act against certain mites (Dermatophagoides farinae, Tyrophagus putrescentiae) and mosquito larvae (Aedes aegypti, Culex pipiens). Hinokitiol is supplemented in commercial tick and insect repellents.

=== Food preservative ===
In experimental studies hinokitiol has been shown to act against Botrytis cinerea, a necrotrophic fungus causing gray mold in many plant species and known to damage horticultural crops. Thus it has been suggested to be used for post-harvest waxing to prevent post-harvest decay. Hinokitiol is a registered food additive in Japan. Hinokitiol appears to suppress food browning through inhibiting browning enzymes, particularly tyrosinase and other polyphenol oxidases by chelating copper ions. This effect has been shown on different vegetables, fruits, mushrooms, flowers, plants, other agricultural products and seafood. Due to the latter effects, hinokitiol is used in food packaging as a shelf-life extending agent.

=== Wood preservative ===
Hinokitiol is one of the chemical compounds isolated from trees, known as extractives, responsible for natural durability of certain trees. Hinokitiol is found in the heartwood of naturally durable trees belonging to the Cupressaceae family. These compounds give the wood natural resistance to decay and insect attacks due to their fungicidal, insecticidal and pesticidal activities. Thereby, hinokitiol, as some other natural extractives, is suggested to be used as a wood preservative for timber treatment.

== Research directions ==
=== Iron transport ===
Researchers screening a library of small biomolecules for signs of iron transport found that hinokitiol restored cell functionality. Further work by the team suggested a mechanism by which hinokitiol restores or reduces cell iron.

=== Cancer research ===
Different in-vitro studies have investigated the effects of hinokitiol on various tumor cell lines.

== See also ==
- Thujaplicins
- Tropolone
- Ionophore
- Cupressaceae
