= Stipitatonate decarboxylase =

Class of enzymes

Identifiers
- EC no.: 4.1.1.60
- CAS no.: 37290-52-1

Databases
- BRENDA: enzyme data
- ExPASy: NiceZyme view
- KEGG: enzyme entry
- MetaCyc: metabolic pathway
- Rhea: reactions
- PDB structures: RCSB PDB PDBe PDBsum
- Gene Ontology: AmiGO / QuickGO
Search
- PMC: articles
- PubMed: articles
- NCBI: proteins

The enzyme stipitatonate decarboxylase (EC 4.1.1.60) characterised from Penicillium stipitatum catalyzes the chemical reaction:

stipitatonate $\rightleftharpoons$ stipitatate + CO_{2}

This enzyme is a lyase, specifically a carboxy-lyase, which cleave carbon-carbon bonds. The systematic name of this enzyme class is stipitatonate carboxy-lyase (decyclizing, stipitatate-forming). This enzyme is also called stipitatonate carboxy-lyase (decyclizing).
