= Thujaplicinol =

Natural organic compound

α-Thujaplicinol
β-Thujaplicinol

Identifiers
CAS Number	α-: 16643-33-7; β-: 4356-35-8
3D model (JSmol)	α-: Interactive image; β-: Interactive image
ChEMBL	β-: ChEMBL550937
ChemSpider	α-: 57499060; β-: 65481
PubChem CID	α-: 57957991; β-: 72605
UNII	β-: UW241P2H16
CompTox Dashboard (EPA)	α-: DTXSID501316946; β-: DTXSID70195876
- InChI: α-: InChI=1S/C10H12O3/c1-6(2)7-4-3-5-8(11)10(13)9(7)12/h3-6H,1-2H3,(H2,11,12,13) Key: DTNGDTFARJMFLC-UHFFFAOYSA-N; β-: InChI=1S/C10H12O3/c1-6(2)7-3-4-8(11)10(13)9(12)5-7/h3-6H,1-2H3,(H2,11,12,13) Key: HVGNSPLLPQWYGC-UHFFFAOYSA-N
- SMILES: α-: CC(C)C1=CC=CC(=O)C(=C1O)O; β-: CC(C)C1=CC(=O)C(=C(C=C1)O)O

Properties
Chemical formula	C_{10}H_{12}O_{3}
Molar mass	180.203 g·mol^{−1}
- Except where otherwise noted, data are given for materials in their standard state (at 25 °C [77 °F], 100 kPa). Infobox references

Thujaplicinol is either of two isomeric tropolone-related natural products. They are found primarily in the bark, needles, and xylem of trees in the Cupressaceae family, such as Cupressus, Thuja, Juniperus, and Thujopsis. The thujaplicinols are structurally equivalent to the thujaplicins with an additional hydroxyl group. They belong to the class of natural terpenoids having two free hydroxyl groups at C3 and C5 position.

The thujaplicinols are highly volatile compounds. It is known that the presence of such tropolones, including alpha-tropolone and its isopropyl derivatives, result in the high natural durability of wood species, such as western red cedar, juniper and cypress.

== Uses ==
Alpha-thujaplicinol, an isomer of thujaplicinol, is often encountered in the Asian species of Thujopsis dolabrata, and exhibits high antibacterial and antifungal activities. It has been found to be effective against Enterococcus faecalis and Legionella pneumophila, even at low inhibitory concentrations (1.56 to 50 mg/ml).

In a 2004 study, α-thujaplicinol showed to have high cytotoxic effects upon several cancer cell lines, such as human stomach cancer and murine lymphocytic leukemia.

The other isomer of the compound is called β-thujaplicinol. A recent study found out that it inhibited the development of hepatocellular carcinoma cells because it triggered the autophagic cell death and a subsequent apoptosis.

Earlier studies have shown that β-thujaplicinol can additionally suppress estrogen-dependent breast cancer by regulating the estrogen receptor signaling.
