= Tropolone =

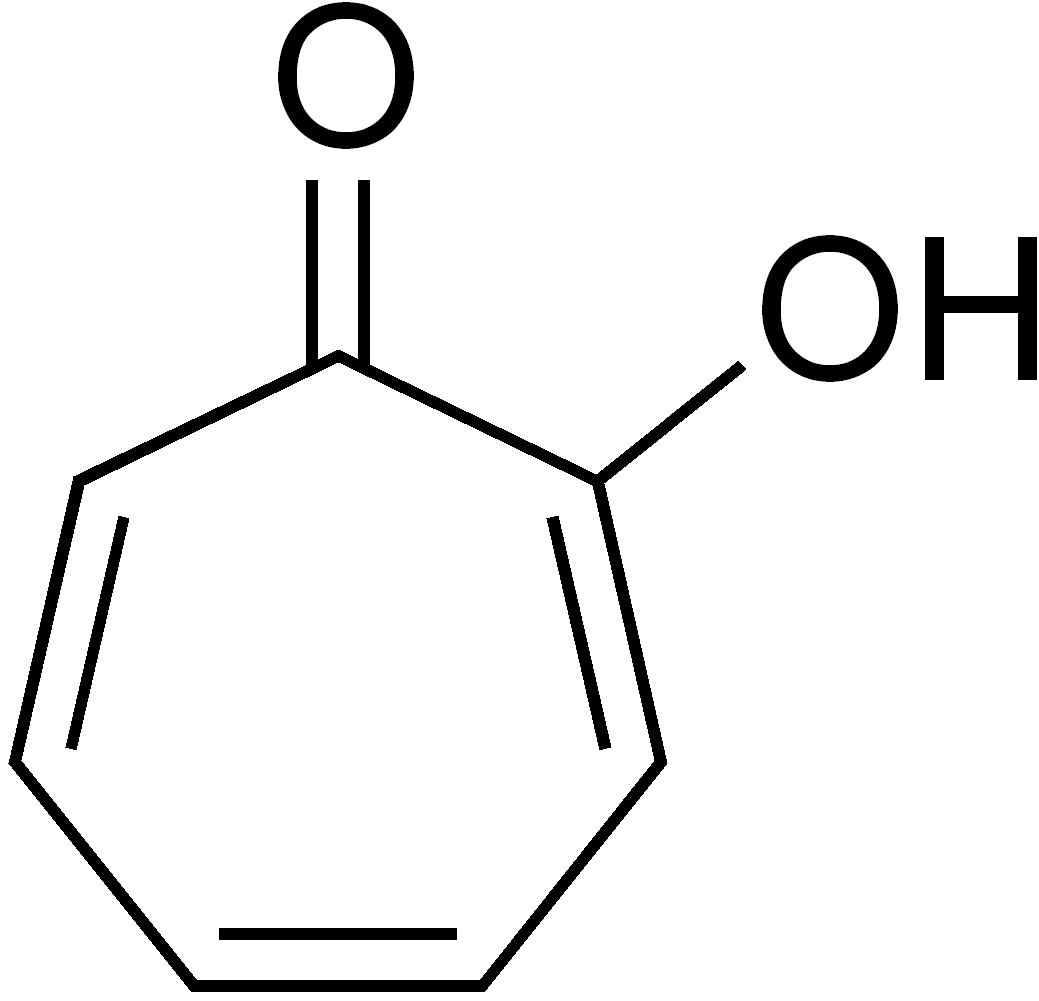
Skeletal formula of tropolone
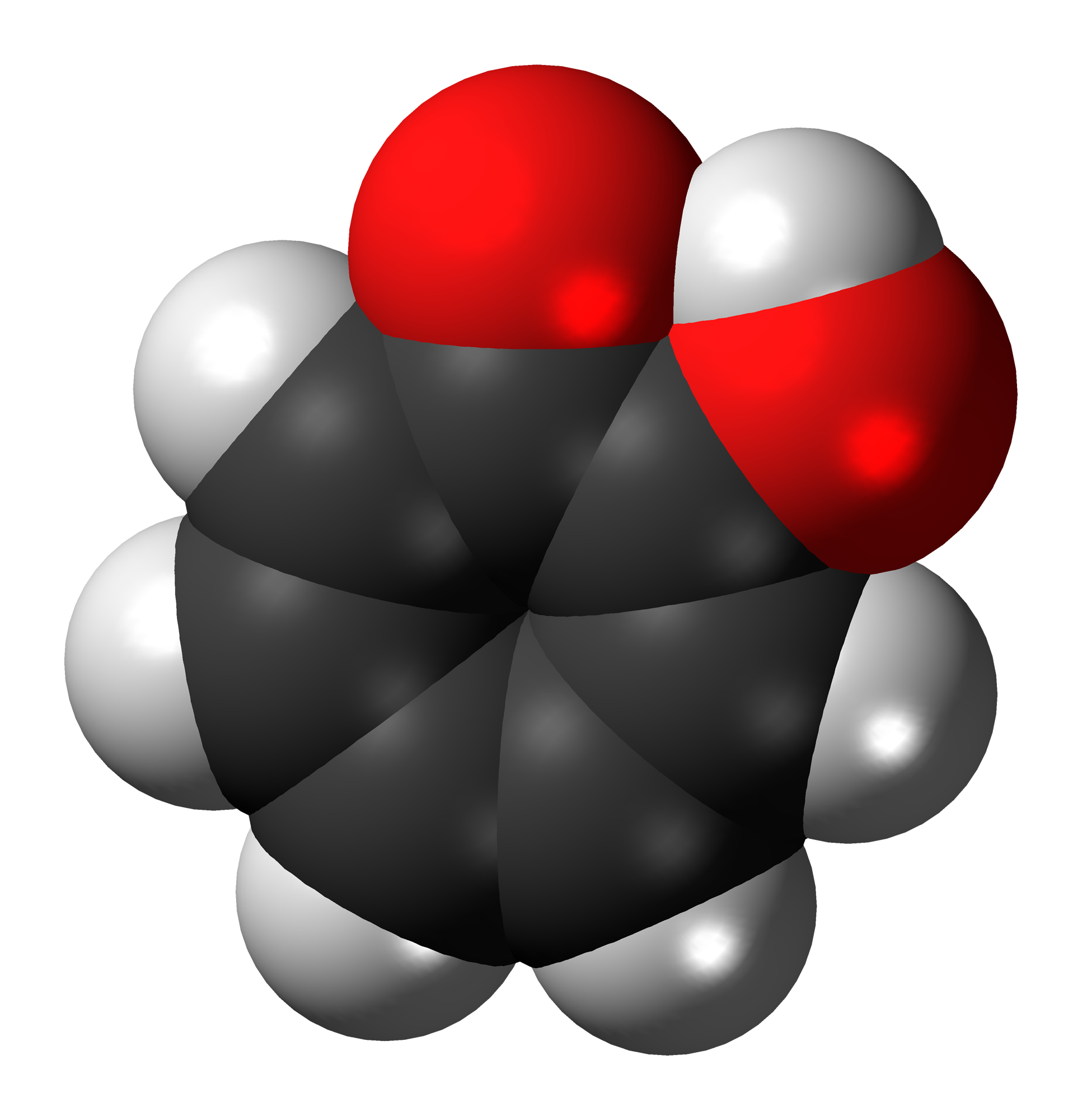
Space-filling model of tropolone

Names
- Preferred IUPAC name 2-Hydroxycyclohepta-2,4,6-trien-1-one
- Other names 2-Hydroxytropone; Purpurocatechol

Identifiers
CAS Number	533-75-5
3D model (JSmol)	Interactive image
ChEBI	CHEBI:79966
ChEMBL	ChEMBL121188
ChemSpider	10333
ECHA InfoCard	100.007.799
EC Number	208-577-2
KEGG	C15474
MeSH	D014334
PubChem CID	10789
UNII	7L6DL16P1T
CompTox Dashboard (EPA)	DTXSID8049416
- InChI: InChI=1S/C7H6O2/c8-6-4-2-1-3-5-7(6)9/h1-5H,(H,8,9) Key: MDYOLVRUBBJPFM-UHFFFAOYSA-N; InChI=1/C7H6O2/c8-6-4-2-1-3-5-7(6)9/h1-5H,(H,8,9) Key: MDYOLVRUBBJPFM-UHFFFAOYAW
- SMILES: C1=CC=C(C(=O)C=C1)O

Properties
Chemical formula	C_{7}H_{6}O_{2}
Molar mass	122.12 g/mol
Melting point	50 to 52 °C (122 to 126 °F; 323 to 325 K)
Boiling point	80 to 84 °C (176 to 183 °F; 353 to 357 K) (0.1 mmHg)
Acidity (pK_{a})	6.89 (−0.5 for conjugate acid)
Magnetic susceptibility (χ)	−61·10^{−6} cm^{3}/mol

Hazards
- GHS labelling
Pictograms	(GHS05: Corrosive) (GHS07: Exclamation mark) (GHS09: Environmental hazard)
Signal word	Danger
Hazard statements	H314, H317, H410
Precautionary statements	P260, P264, P272, P273, P280, P301+P330+P331, P302+P352, P303+P361+P353, P304+P340, P305+P351+P338, P310, P333+P313, P363, P391, P405, P501
Flash point	112 °C (234 °F; 385 K)

Related compounds
Related compounds	Hinokitiol (4-isopropyl-tropolone)
- Except where otherwise noted, data are given for materials in their standard state (at 25 °C [77 °F], 100 kPa). verify (what is ?) Infobox references

Tropolone is an organic compound with the chemical formula C_{7}H_{5}(OH)O. It is a pale yellow solid that is soluble in organic solvents. The compound has been of interest to research chemists because of its unusual electronic structure and its role as a ligand precursor. Although not usually prepared from tropone, it can be viewed as its derivative with a hydroxyl group in the 2-position.

== Synthesis and reactions ==
Many methods have been described for the synthesis of tropolone. One involves bromination of 1,2-cycloheptanedione with N-bromosuccinimide followed by dehydrohalogenation at elevated temperatures, while another uses acyloin condensation of the ethyl ester of pimelic acid the acyloin again followed by oxidation by bromine.

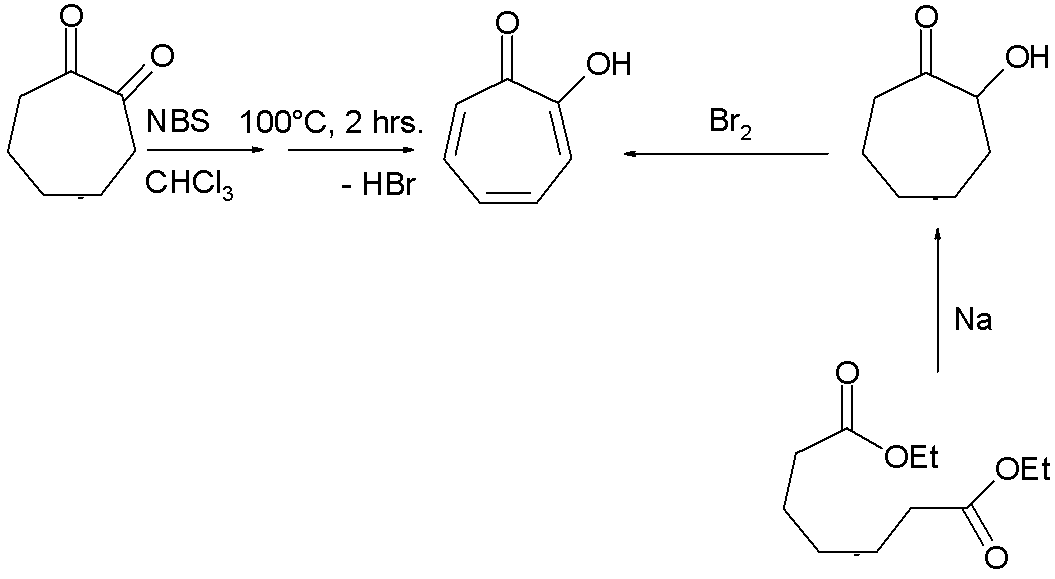

An alternate route is a [2+2] cycloaddition of cyclopentadiene with a ketene to give a bicyclo[3.2.0]heptyl structure, followed by hydrolysis and breakage of the fusion bond to give the single ring:

Thy hydroxyl group of tropolone is acidic, having a pK_{a} of 7, which is in between that of phenol (10) and benzoic acid (4). The increased acidity compared to phenol is due to resonance stabilization with the carbonyl group, as a vinylogous carboxylic acid.

The compound readily undergoes O-alkylation to give cycloheptatrienyl derivatives, which in turn are versatile synthetic intermediates. With metal cations, it undergoes deprotonation to form a bidentate ligand, such as in the Cu(O_{2}C_{7}H_{5})_{2} complex.

The carbonyl group is also highly polarized, as common for tropones. There can be substantial hydrogen bonding between it and the hydroxyl group, leading to rapid tautomerization: the structure is symmetric on the NMR timescale.

== Natural occurrence ==
Around 200 naturally occurring tropolone derivatives have been isolated, mostly from plants and fungi. Tropolone compounds and their derivatives include dolabrins, dolabrinols, thujaplicins, thujaplicinols, stipitatic acid, stipitatonic acid, nootkatin, nootkatinol, puberulic acid, puberulonic acid, sepedonin, 4-acetyltropolone, pygmaein, isopygmaein, procein, chanootin, benzotropolones (such as purpurogallin, crocipodin, goupiolone A and B), theaflavin and derivatives bromotropolones, tropoisoquinolines and tropoloisoquinolines (such as grandirubrine, imerubrine, isoimerubrine, pareitropone, pareirubrine A and B), colchicine, colchicone and others. Tropolone arises via a polyketide pathway, which affords a phenolic intermediate that undergoes ring expansion.

They are especially found in specific plant species, such as Cupressaceae and Liliaceae families. Tropolones are mostly abundant in the heartwood, leaves and bark of plants, thereby the essential oils are rich in various types of tropolones. The first natural tropolone derivatives were studied and purified in the mid-1930s and early-1940s. Thuja plicata, Thujopsis dolabrata, Chamaecyparis obtusa, Chamaecyparis taiwanensis and Juniperus thurifera were in the list of trees from which the first tropolones were identified. The first synthetic tropolones were thujaplicins derived by Ralph Raphael.

== Tropolone derivatives ==
Name	Chemical structure	Natural sources
Tropolone		Pseudomonas lindbergii, Pseudomonas plantarii and mushroom tyrosinase.
Hinokitiol		Cupressaceae trees
Stipitatic acid		Talaromyces stipitatus
Colchicine		Colchicum autumnale, Gloriosa superba

Class	Examples	Main natural sources	Research directions	Patented in products
Simple tropolones	Tropolone	Pseudomonas lindbergii, Pseudomonas plantarii	Antibacterial, antifungal, insecticidal, pesticidal, plant growth inhibition, anti-inflammatory, antioxidant, neuroprotection, anti-protease, anti-browning (anti-tyrosinase and anti-polyphenol oxidase), antineoplastic, chelating	-
Dolabrins	β-dolabrin, α-dolabrinol	Caragana pygmaea, Cupressus goveniana, Cupressus abramsiana, Thujopsis dolabrata	Antibacterial, antifungal, insecticidal, pesticidal, plant growth inhibition, protease inhibition	Insect repellent, deodorant
Thujaplicins	α-thujaplicin, β-thujaplicin (hinokitiol), γ-thujaplicin, thujaplicinol	Chamaecyparis obtusa, Thuja plicata, Thujopsis dolabrata, Juniperus cedrus, Cedrus atlantica, Cupressus lusitanica, Chamaecyparis lawsoniana, Chamaecyparis taiwanensis, Chamaecyparis thyoides, Cupressus arizonica, Cupressus macnabiana, Cupressus macrocarpa, Cupressus guadalupensis, Juniperus chinensis, Juniperus communis, Juniperus californica, Juniperus occidentalis, Juniperus oxycedrus, Juniperus sabina, Calocedrus decurrens, Calocedrus formosana, Platycladus orientalis, Thuja occidentalis, Thuja standishii, Tetraclinis articulata, Cattleya forbesii, Carya glabra	Antifungal, antibacterial, anti-browning (anti-tyrosinase), chelating, insecticidal, pesticidal, antimalarial, antiviral, anti-inflammatory, plant growth inhibition, anti-protease, antidiabetic, antineoplastic, chemosensitizing, antioxidant, neuroprotection, veterinary medicine	Insect repellent, deodorant, toothpaste, oral spray, skin and hair care, wood preservative, food additive, food packaging
Sesquiterpene tropolones	Nootkatin, nootkatinol, nootkatol, nootkatene, valencene-13-ol, nootkastatin	Chamaecyparis nootkatensis, Grapefruit	Antifungal, anti-browning (anti-tyrosinase), insecticidal, fungicidal, antineoplastic	Insect repellents, flavor, perfumery
Pygmaeins	Pygmaein, Isopygmaein	Caragana pygmaea, Cupressus goveniana, Cupressus abramsiana	-	-
Benzotropolones	Purpurogallin, crocipodin, goupiolone A and B	Quercus species, Leccinum crocipodium, Goupia glabra	Antibacterial, plant growth inhibition, protease inhibition, antineoplastic, antimalarial, antioxidant, antiviral	Food additive
Theaflavins	Theaflavin, theaflavic acid, theaflavate A and B	Camellia sinensis, Quercus species	Antibacterial, anti-inflammatory, antioxidant, antiviral, antidiabetic, chemosensitizing	-
Tropoisoquinolines and tropoloisoquinolines	Grandirubrine, imerubrine, isoimerubrine, pareitropone, pareirubrine A and B	Cissampelos pareira, Abuta grandifolia	Antileukemic	-
Tropone alkaloids	Colchicine, demecolcine	Colchicum autumnale, Gloriosa superba	Antimitotic, anti-inflammatory, anti-gout, plant breeding	Pharmaceutical drug
