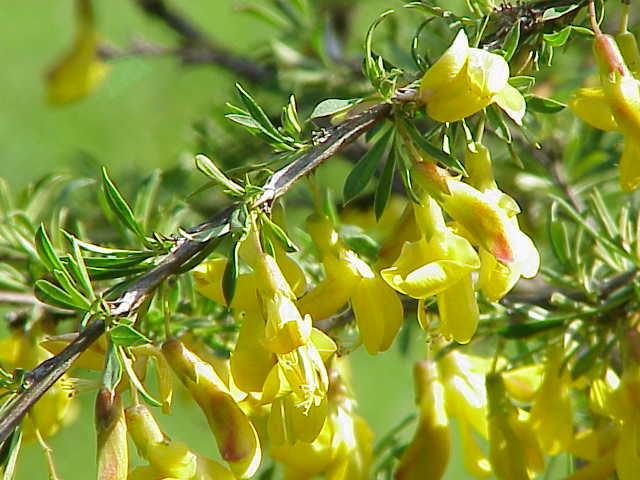

Scientific classification
- Kingdom: Plantae
- Clade: Tracheophytes
- Clade: Angiosperms
- Clade: Eudicots
- Clade: Rosids
- Order: Fabales
- Family: Fabaceae
- Subfamily: Faboideae
- Genus: Caragana
- Species: C. pygmaea

Binomial name
- Caragana pygmaea (L.) DC.

Synonyms
- List: Aspalathus pygmaeus (L.) Kuntze; Robinia pygmaea L.; Caragana altaica (Kom.) Pojark.; Caragana komarovii H.Lév.; Caragana pygmaea var. acicularis Kom.; Caragana pygmaea var. altaica Kom.; Caragana pygmaea lusus angustifolia Kom.; Caragana pygmaea subsp. austrotuvinica Bondareva; Caragana pygmaea lusus brevifolia Kom.; Caragana pygmaea lusus latifolia Kom.; Caragana pygmaea lusus longifolia Kom.; Caragana pygmaea var. ouratensis Kom.; Caragana pygmaea var. parviflora H.C.Fu; Caragana pygmaea var. viridissima Kom.; Caragana splendens Schischk. ex Sobol.

= Caragana pygmaea =

Species of legume

Caragana pygmaea is a species of flowering plant in the family Fabaceae.
