= Burkholderia plantarii =

Scientific classification
- Domain: Bacteria
- Kingdom: Pseudomonadati
- Phylum: Pseudomonadota
- Class: Betaproteobacteria
- Order: Burkholderiales
- Family: Burkholderiaceae
- Genus: Burkholderia
- Species: B. plantarii

Binomial name
- Burkholderia plantarii (Azegami et al. 1987); Urakami et al. 1994

Synonyms
- Pseudomonas plantarii Azegami et al. 1987; Pseudomonas vandii Urakami et al. 1994

Species of bacterium

Burkholderia plantarii is a Gram-negative soil bacterium. Its specific name comes from the Latin plantarium (seedbed).

Burkholderia vandii is a synonym of this species, which was named after the orchid Vanda, where it was first found.
