= Stipitatic acid =

- Chemical structure of stipitatic acid

Names
- Preferred IUPAC name 3,6-Dihydroxy-5-oxocyclohepta-1,3,6-triene-1-carboxylic acid

Identifiers
| CAS Number | 4440-39-5 |
| 3D model (JSmol) | Interactive image |
| Beilstein Reference | 2723909 |
| ChEBI | CHEBI:15957 |
| ChemSpider | 19955692 |
| KEGG | C01853 |
| PubChem CID | 20501 |
| UNII | 35DNB4NP54 |
| CompTox Dashboard (EPA) | DTXSID80891817 |
- InChI: InChI=1S/C8H6O5/c9-5-1-4(8(12)13)2-6(10)7(11)3-5/h1-3,10-11H,(H,12,13)
- SMILES: C1=C(C=C(C(=CC1=O)O)O)C(=O)O

Properties
| Chemical formula | C_{8}H_{6}O_{5} |
| Molar mass | 182.131 g·mol^{−1} |
- Except where otherwise noted, data are given for materials in their standard state (at 25 °C [77 °F], 100 kPa). Infobox references

Stipitatic acid is a tropolone derivative isolated from Talaromyces stipitatus (Penicillium stipitatum).
