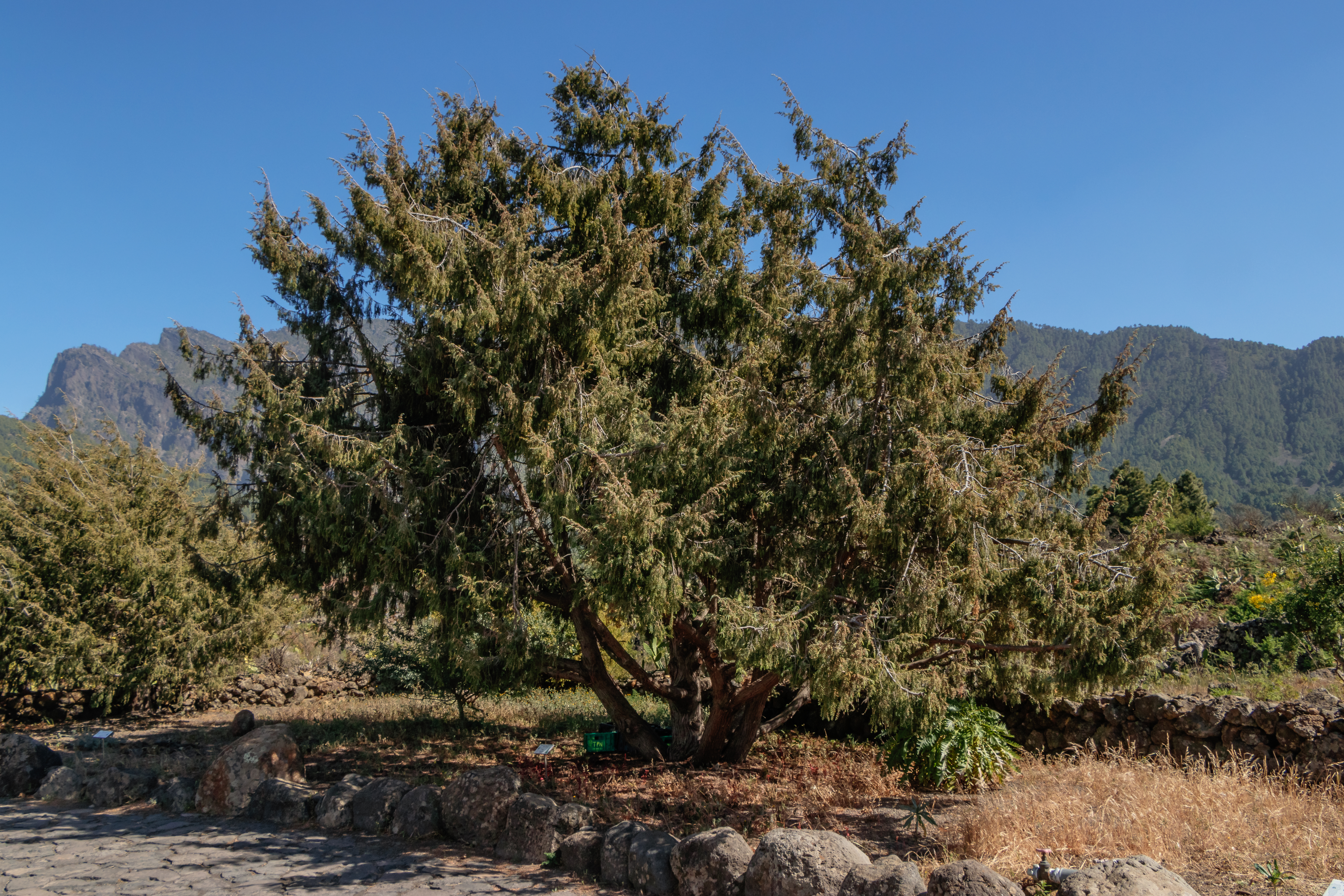

Conservation status
- Endangered (IUCN 3.1)

Scientific classification
- Kingdom: Plantae
- Clade: Tracheophytes
- Clade: Gymnosperms
- Division: Pinophyta
- Class: Pinopsida
- Order: Cupressales
- Family: Cupressaceae
- Genus: Juniperus
- Section: Juniperus sect. Juniperus
- Species: J. cedrus

Binomial name
- Juniperus cedrus Webb & Berthel.

= Juniperus cedrus =

Species of conifer

Juniperus cedrus, the Canary Islands juniper, is a species of juniper in the cypress family Cupressaceae, native to the western Canary Islands (Tenerife, La Palma, Gran Canaria, Gomera) and Madeira (J. cedrus Webb & Berthel. subsp. maderensis (Menezes) Rivas Mart et al.), where it occurs at elevations of 500–2400 m. It is closely related to Juniperus oxycedrus (Prickly Juniper) of the Mediterranean region and Juniperus brevifolia (Azores Juniper) of the Azores.

It is a large shrub or tree growing to a height of 5–20 m (rarely 25 m). The leaves are evergreen, needle-like, in whorls of three, green to glaucous-green, 8–23 mm long and 1–2 mm broad, with a double white stomatal band (split by a green midrib) on the inner surface. It is usually dioecious, with separate male and female plants. The seed cones are berry-like, green ripening in 18 months to orange-red with a variable pink waxy coating; they are spherical, 8–15 mm diameter, and have six fused scales in two whorls of three; the three larger scales each with a single seed. The seeds are dispersed when birds eat the cones, digesting the fleshy scales and passing the hard seeds in their droppings. The male cones are yellow, 2–3 mm long, and fall soon after shedding their pollen in February–March.

It is endangered in its native range due to a combination of historical felling for the valuable wood, and overgrazing by goats. It has been fully protected since 1953 and populations are very slowly recovering. Historical reports suggest trees up to 30 m tall occurred in the past; trees over 10 m are very rare now and confined to inaccessible cliffs.

It is occasionally grown as an ornamental tree in warm temperate climates, including New Zealand, the British Isles and California, but is not common in cultivation. There are also some small experimental plantations on the Canary Islands, where it has shown fast growth in good conditions, reaching about 14–15 m tall in 40 years.

Extraction of the wood with acetone, followed by analysis of the extract, indicate that the essential oil of Juniperus cedrus is particularly rich in thujopsene, which comprises around 2.2% of the weight of the heartwood.

== General references and external links ==
- Gymnosperm Database: Juniperus cedrus
- Photos of tree and cones
- Farjon, A. (2005). A Monograph of Cupressaceae (p. 255).
- Rumeu Ruiz, B, de Sequeira, M, Elliot, M & Gardner, M. 2011. Juniperus cedrus. The IUCN Red List of Threatened Species. Version 2015.2. Downloaded on 1 September 2015.
