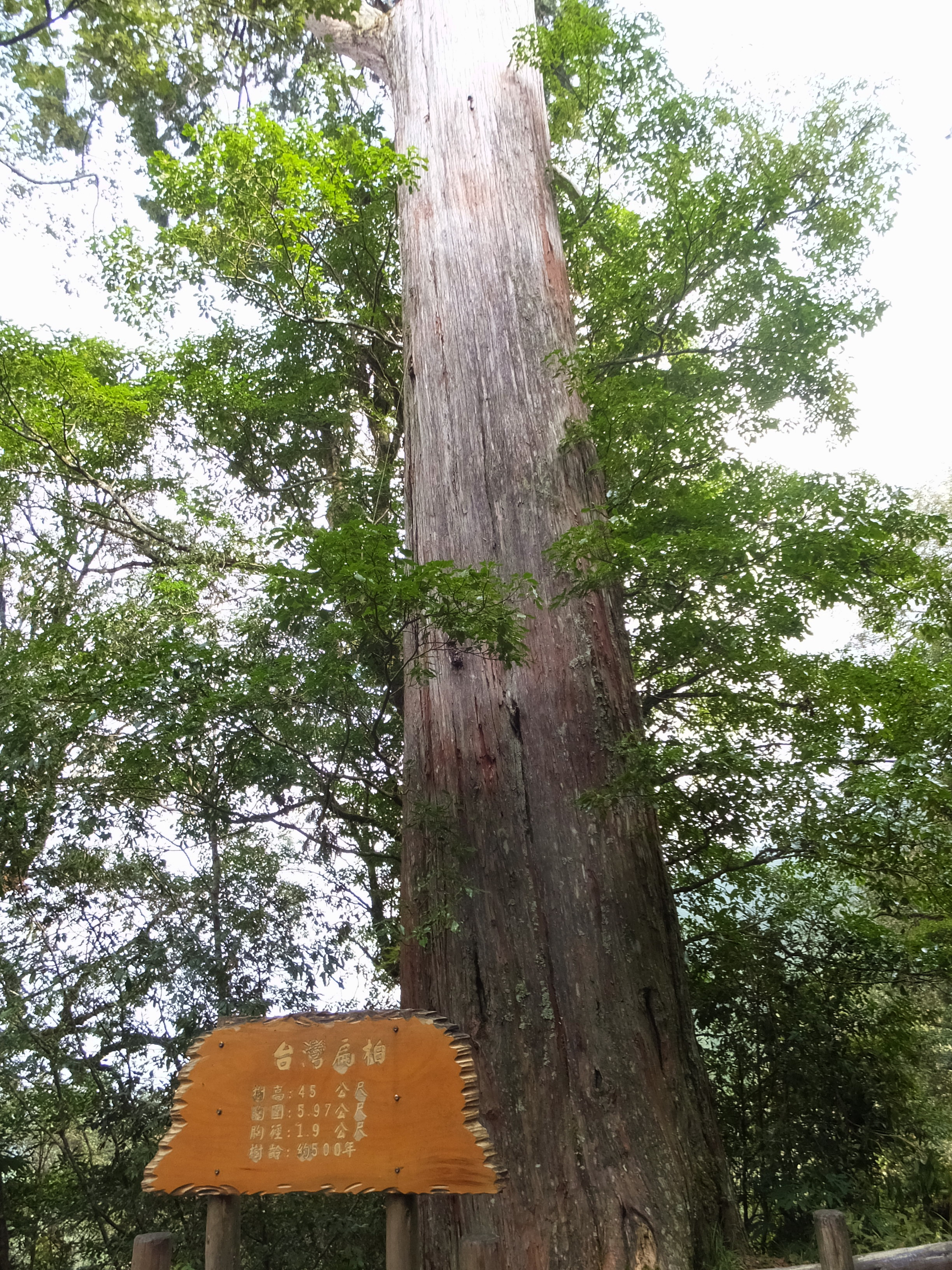

Conservation status
- Vulnerable (IUCN 3.1)

Scientific classification
- Kingdom: Plantae
- Clade: Embryophytes
- Clade: Tracheophytes
- Clade: Gymnosperms
- Division: Pinophyta
- Class: Pinopsida
- Order: Cupressales
- Family: Cupressaceae
- Genus: Chamaecyparis
- Species: C. taiwanensis

Binomial name
- Chamaecyparis taiwanensis Masam. & Suzuki

Synonyms
- Chamaecyparis obtusa f. formosana Hayata; Chamaecyparis obtusa var. formosana (Hayata) Hayata; Cupressus obtusa subsp. formosana (Hayata) Silba; Retinispora taiwanensis (Masam. & Suzuki) A.V.Bobrov & Melikyan

= Chamaecyparis taiwanensis =

Species of conifer

Chamaecyparis taiwanensis (Taiwan cypress; simplified Chinese: 台湾扁柏; traditional Chinese: 臺灣扁柏; pinyin: tái wān biǎn bǎi) is a species of conifer in the family Cupressaceae, native to the mountains of Taiwan, where it grows at altitudes of 1300–2800 m. Common names include Taiwan (Formosan) cypress and Formosan false-cypress.

== Description ==
It is a slow-growing coniferous tree growing to 40 m tall with a trunk up to 2 m in diameter. The bark is red-brown, vertically fissured and with a stringy texture. The foliage is arranged in flat sprays; adult leaves are scale-like, 0.8–1.5 mm long, with acute tips (unlike the blunt tips of the leaves of the closely related Japanese Chamaecyparis obtusa (Hinoki Cypress), green above, green below with a white stomatal band at the base of each scale-leaf; they are arranged in opposite decussate pairs on the shoots. The juvenile leaves, found on young seedlings, are needle-like, 4–8 mm long. The cones are globose, smaller than those of C. obtusa, 7–9 mm diameter, with 6–10 scales arranged in opposite pairs, maturing in autumn about 7–8 months after pollination.

== Taxonomy ==
It is most commonly treated as a variety of Chamaecyparis obtusa in European and American texts, but more often accepted as a distinct species by Taiwanese botanists. The two taxa differ in ecological requirements, with C. obtusa growing primarily on drier ridgetop sites, while C. taiwanensis occurs on moist soils and with higher rainfall and air humidity.

== Related species ==
A related cypress also found on Taiwan, Chamaecyparis formosensis (Formosan Cypress), differs in leaves which are green below as well as above without a conspicuous white stomatal band, and longer, slenderer ovoid cones 6–10 mm long with 10–16 scales.
