= Impregnation (disambiguation) =

Impregnation, Impregnated, or Impregnating may refer to:

- In biology, a few related meanings:
  - Causing pregnancy (e.g. forced impregnation)
  - Fertilisation, especially human fertilization (e.g. self-impregnating)
  - Insemination (e.g. artificial impregnation, impregnation fetishism)
- In chemistry, adding one substance to another, especially when adding a fluid to fill in gaps in a material, e.g.:
  - Ceramic-impregnated fabric
  - Impregnated wood
  - Impregnation resin
  - Incipient wetness impregnation
  - Liquid-impregnated surface
  - Phenolic-impregnated carbon ablator
  - Silicone impregnated refractory ceramic ablator
  - Solvent impregnated resin
  - Vacuum impregnating
- Impregnated (film), a 2022 Peruvian–Argentinian romantic comedy movie

== See also ==
- Impregnated with Wonder, 2011 album by Pete Holmes
- HMS Impregnable, multiple ships and establishments of the Royal Navy
