= Sirca (disambiguation) =

Sirca may refer to:

- SIRCA, an Australian online service provider
- Sirča, a village situated in Kraljevo municipality in Serbia.
- Majda Širca (born 1953), Slovenian art historian, journalist, and politician
- Silicone Impregnated Refractory Ceramic Ablator
