= WPG (disambiguation) =

WPG is the city code for Winnipeg, Manitoba, Canada.

WPG also may refer to:

- Weight per gallon, a measure of density
- Weight percentage gain, a measurement in chemical wood preservation
- WordPerfect Graphics, a graphic format for WordPerfect word processor
