= Ramon Torrecillas =

Ramón Torrecillas San Millán
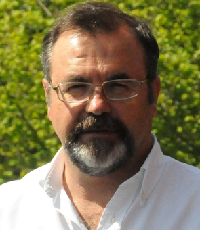
- Born: 30 August 1963 (age 63); Oviedo, Asturias, Spain
- Education: Universidad de Zaragoza and INSA de Lyon
- Known for: Bioceramics; Nanocomposites
- Scientific career
- Fields: Materials Technology and Inorganic Chemistry
- Workplaces: Spanish National Research Council (CSIC)

Ramon Torrecillas (Oviedo, 30 August 1963) is a Spanish physicist and materials scientist internationally recognized for his research in the fields of nanomaterials and biomaterials. Since December 2019 he is Head of the Brussels' Office of the Spanish National Research Council (CSIC), which holds the institutional representation of the CSIC before the institutions of the EU and other relevant organizations and forums.

He has published more than 220 scientific articles and book chapters and filed 19 patents.

== Biography ==
He received his bachelor's degree in physics in 1986 from the University of Zaragoza. Afterwards he moved to the Institut National des Sciences Appliquees of Lyon (INSA-Lyon) in France where he started his research on thermomechanical properties of advanced ceramics. In 1991 he received a PhD in physics from the National Distance Education University, Directors: J.S.Moya and S. de Aza, and became director of the Ceramics and Refractories department of the Instituto Tecnológico de Materiales de Asturias, a Spanish technological research center, a position he held until 1994. In December that same year he obtained his PhD in Materials Engineering from the Institut National des Sciences Appliquees of Lyon with a thesis titled "Mechanical Behavior of Mullite and Mullite-Zirconia Composites Obtained by Reactive Sintering.

In 1994 he joined the National Institute of Coal (INCAR) belonging to the Spanish National Research Council (CSIC) where he established and headed until 2008 the Department of Nanostructured Ceramics. In 2008 he became full research Professor of the CSIC and was appointed founding director of the Nanomaterials and Nanotechnology Research Center (CINN).

In 2009 he was appointed general manager of the Asturian Materials Techchnology Center ITMA sharing this position until 2011 with the managing direction of the CINN.

In 2011 he founded the company NANOKER Research SL, which manufactures advanced technical ceramics, nanomaterials and nanocomposites for optical, biomedical applications and extreme conditions

In December 2019 he was appointed Delegate of the Spanish National Research Council to the EU in Brussels.

== Research projects ==
He has led some of the most relevant European projects in the fields of Biomaterials and Nanomaterials.

- Innovative spark plasma sintering technologies for the development of a new class of nanocomposite materials for mechanical engineering application http://www.m24.ru/videos/56743
- IP NANOKER-Structural ceramic nanocomposites for top-end functional applications.
- Bioker "Extending the life span of orthopaedic implants: development of ceramic hip and knee prostheses with improved zirconia toughened alumina nanocomposites"

== Awards and recognitions ==
- Member of the World Academy of Ceramics in the Class "Science"
- Leading Scientist at the Moscow State Technological University, STANKIN
- Editor of the peer-reviewed Journal of Nanomaterials
- Editor of the peer-reviewed Journal Vestnik MSTU «Stankin»
- Member of the International Advisory Board of Wiley Interdisciplinary Reviews: Nanomedicine and Nanobiotechnology
