= Michael James Aitken =

Author

Michael J. Aitken
- Born: 1957 (age 68–69); Wairoa, Hawkes Bay, New Zealand
- Education: Massey University, University of New South Wales
- Known for: Commercialising academic research; empirical measures of the quality of financial and health markets; SIRCA, Thomson Reuters Tick History, SMARTS, Market Quality Framework, Market Quality Dashboard, HiBIS, I+Plus
- Awards: Outstanding manuscript award, AAANZ (1991), Best manuscript in Australian Journal of Management (1995), BHERT Award for Outstanding Achievement in Collaboration in Education and Training (1999), SIRCA Prolific Career Contribution to Financial Markets Research (2009), Prime Minister ICT Exporter of the Year (2010), Member of the Order of Australia (AM) (2014)
- Scientific career
- Fields: Finance, Accounting, Microstructure, Financial Markets, Financial Regulation, Entrepreneurship
- Workplaces: Capital Markets Cooperative Research Centre, Macquarie University, University of New South Wales, University of Sydney
- Thesis: The Effects of Deregulation on the Australian Securities Industry
- Website: www.cmcrc.com

Michael James Aitken is a New Zealand author who specializes in the area of security market microstructure and design. He is listed among the top 1000 authors publishing in the finance literature over the last 50 years. His research has contributed to the understanding of market microstructure and its impact on market efficiency and, in particular, on market integrity.
This results in great part from his role in the design of information systems for real-time fraud detection in securities markets (e.g., insider trading, market manipulation).

== Career ==
Early in his career, he designed courses and computer programs to support the curriculum for fourth year honours and PhD programs. Along with "Trading and Dealing in Securities Markets" and "Broking and Market-Making", he developed “REPLAY”, a program that enables the dynamics of any automated security market to be replayed in its entirety, providing access to the working dynamics of securities markets for research and training purposes. Aitken then provided the software and exercise manual to universities through SIRCA which he founded in 1997. He also designed the software program “EVENTS”, that allows any major market event (e.g., a market crash) to be reconstructed, allowing a common research design used in finance, event studies, to be produced in a matter of hours and proved an innovation in academia, as explained below. Both programs are now part of SMARTS, the world-leading software for market surveillance, sold to NASDAQ OMX in 2010.

With infrastructure funding, he also led the development of physical research infrastructure (super-computers, data, software; culminating in the current SIRCA and Thomson Reuters Tick History) and developed an innovation in academia called the “work-based” learning model designed for post-graduate students. The model was awarded the Business Higher Education Roundtable (BHERT) Outstanding Achievement in Collaboration in Education and Training in a program over 3 years in duration in 1999. The award noted the research's innovativeness; the strength of the relationship between collaborating partners; its outreach inclusion (e.g. overseas - to other groups, companies, its national benefits; and cultural impact on the partner/organisation.

Aitken pioneered the Market Quality Framework and Market Quality Dashboard, designed to estimate the impact of market design change on market quality. He has led the development of a suite of commercial software services to the securities, broking, health insurance and accounting and audit industries as part of his work for the CMCRC. He has recently extended R&D into a new domain in order to detect fraud in the health sector, giving rise to the HiBiS and I+Plus technology to detect waste, errors and fraud in the health sector.

Aitken acts as an expert witness and has applied the technologies developed at the CMCRC to assist Courts, regulators and market participants in allegations of insider trading, market manipulation and breaches of disclosure, establishing new standards in the process. Since 1998, he has acted as an expert in matters involving insider trading, market manipulation, the impact of information, front-running and broker-client conflict in Australia, New Zealand, the UK, Singapore, Hong Kong and has provided expert reports on issues of market microstructure, market efficiency and market integrity to regulators, exchanges, brokers, intermediaries and other institutions concerned with financial markets.

In 2014, Aitken was appointed a Member of the Order of Australia in recognition of his significant service to the business and finance sector, particularly to market surveillance and fraud detection technologies, and to education.

=== Industry appointments ===
- Chief Scientist, RoZetta Institute (formerly Capital Markets Cooperative Research Centre), https://www.rozetta.com.au/ July 2018 – Dec 2022
- Chief Executive Officer, Capital Markets Cooperative Research Centre; January 2013 – June 2018
- Nonexecutive Chairman – SMARTS group and various directorships associated with subsidiaries of the SMARTS Group; July 2001 – August 2010
- Chief Executive Officer, Capital Markets Cooperative Research Centre, www.cmcrc.com; July 2001 to October 2006
- Chief Executive Officer, Securities Industry Research Centre of Asia-Pacific, www.sirca.org.au; July 1997 to July 2001
- Executive Director, Asia-Pacific Capital Markets Limited; July 1997 to July 2001
- Chief Executive Officer, SMARTS group; September 1994 to July 2001

=== Academic appointments ===
- Chair for ICT Strategy, Macquarie University, Sydney, Australia (1 April 2014 – present)
- Chair of Capital Market Technology – University of New South Wales, Sydney, Australia (September 2001 to 1 April 2014)
- Professor – Finance, University of Sydney, Sydney, Australia (May 1995 to September 2001)

== Academic qualifications ==
- Bachelor of Business Studies, 1st Class Honours (1978) Massey University, New Zealand.
- Master of Business Studies (1980) Massey University, New Zealand.
- Doctor of Philosophy (1991), Australian Graduate School of Management, University of New South Wales. The Effects of Deregulation on the Australian Securities Industry.

== Awards and honours ==
1. Recipient of 1991 outstanding manuscript award, AAANZ, 1991
2. Recipient (with other co-authors) of 1995 prize for the best manuscript in Australian Journal of Management, 1995.
3. Business Higher Education Roundtable Award for Outstanding Achievement in Collaboration in Education and Training in a program over 3 years in duration, 1999
4. SIRCA Prolific Career Contribution to Financial Markets Research, 2009
5. Ernst and Young National ICT Entrepreneur of the Year 2010
6. NSW ICT and Overall Exporter of the Year (SMARTS), 2010
7. Prime Minister ICT Exporter of the Year, 2010
8. Appointed Member of the Order of Australia, June 2014

== Publications ==
=== Books ===
1. The Microstructure of the Australian Stock Exchange: An Introduction, with A. Frino, E. Jarnecic, M. McCorry and R. Winn, Asia-Pacific Capital Markets Foundation, Book Series 1997.
2. Accounting and Financial Management, with M Hirst, Australian Graduate School of Management, 1989
3. Investing on the Australian Sharemarket, with A Burrowes and R Mullholland, Macmillan Publishing Company, December 1983(Fifth reprint 1987)
4. The Development of Accounting Theory - Significant Contributors to Accounting Thought in the 20th Century with M Gaffikin, Garland Publishing Company, December 1982. Reprinted 2013
