= Solvent impregnated resin =

Solvent impregnated resins (SIRs) are commercially available (macro)porous resins impregnated with a solvent/an extractant. In this approach, a liquid extractant is contained within the pores of (adsorption) particles. Usually, the extractant is an organic liquid. Its purpose is to extract one or more dissolved components from a surrounding aqueous environment. The basic principle combines adsorption, chromatography and liquid-liquid extraction.

== History ==
The principle of Solvent Impregnated Resins was first shown in 1971 by Abraham Warshawsky. This first venture was aimed at the extraction of metals. Ever since then, SIRs have been mainly used for metal extraction, be it heavy metals or specifically radioactive metals. Much research on SIRs has been done by J.L Cortina and e.g. N. Kabay, K. Jerabek or J. Serarols. However, lately investigations also go towards using SIRs for the separation of natural compounds, and even for separation of biotechnological products.

== Basic principle ==
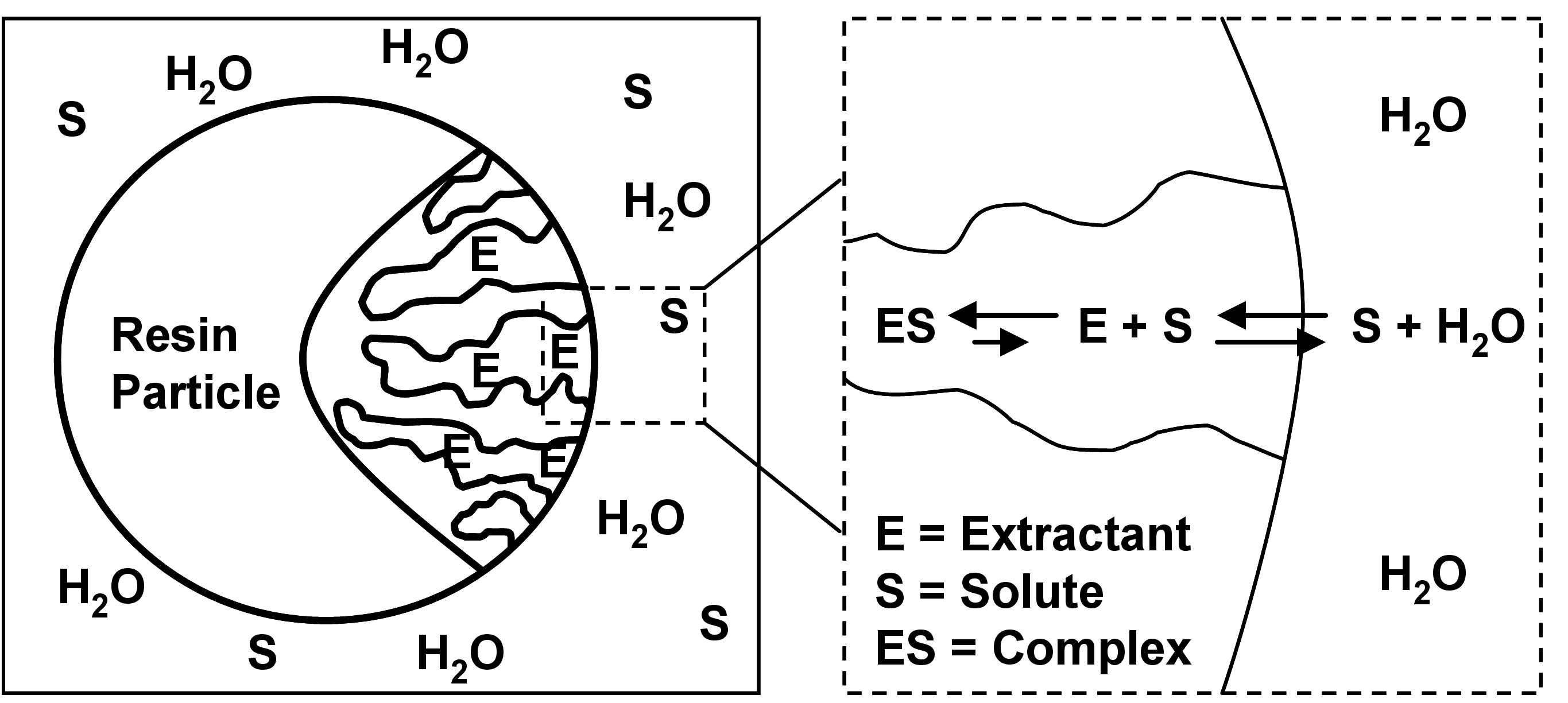
Figure 1: Basic principle of extraction with SIR.

Figure 1 to the right explains the basic principle, in which the organic extractant E is contained inside the pores of a porous particle. The solute S, which is initially dissolved in the aqueous phase surrounding the SIR particle, physically dissolves in the organic extractant phase during the extraction process. Furthermore, the solute S can react with the extractant to form a complex ES. This complexation of the solute with the extractant shifts the overall extraction equilibrium further towards the organic phase. This way, the extraction of the solute is enhanced.

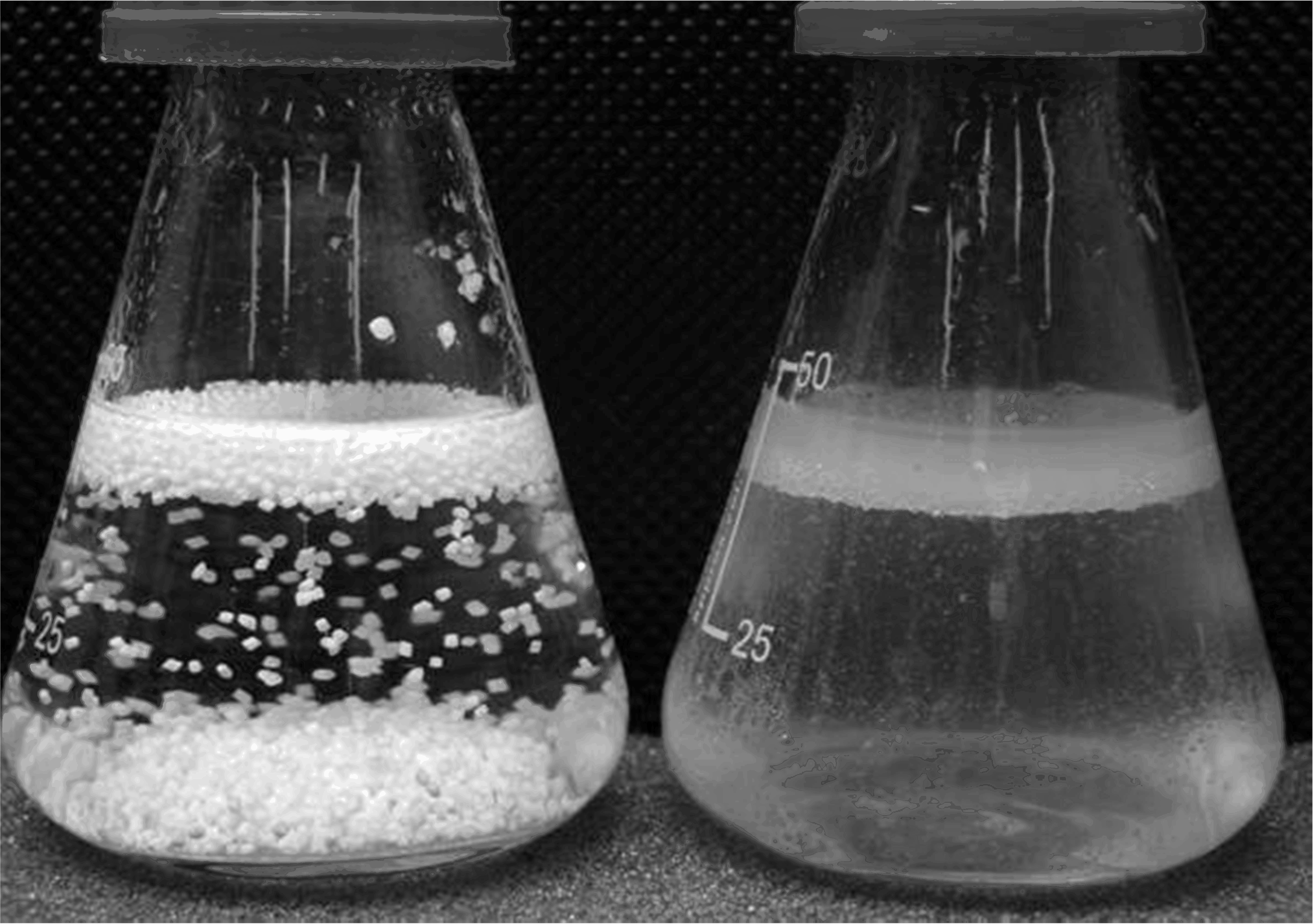
Figure 2: Comparison of emulsification during liquid-liquid extraction and with SIR particles.

While during conventional liquid-liquid extraction the solvent and the extractant have to be dispersed, in a SIR setup the dispersion is already achieved by the impregnated particles. This also prevents an additional phase separation step, which would be necessary after the emulsification occurring in liquid-liquid extraction. In order to elucidate the effect of emulsification, Figure 2 (to the left) compares the two systems of an extractant in liquid-liquid equilibrium with water, left, and SIR particles in equilibrium with water, right. The figure shows that no emulsification occurs in the SIR system, whereas the liquid-liquid system shows turbidity implying emulsification. Also, the impregnation step decreases the solvent loss into the aqueous phase compared to liquid-liquid extraction. This decrease of extractant loss is contributed to physical sorption of the extractant on the particle surface, which means that the extractant inside the pores does not entirely behave as a bulk liquid. Depending on the pore size of the used particles, capillary forces may also play a role in retaining the extractant. Otherwise, van-der-Waals forces, pi-pi-interactions or hydrophobic interactions might stabilize the extractant inside the particle pores. However, the possible decrease of extractant loss depends largely on the pore size and the water solubility of the extractant. Nonetheless, SIRs have a significant advantage over e.g. custom made ion-exchange resins with chemically bonded ligands. SIRs can be reused for different separation tasks by just rinsing one complexing agent out and re-impregnating them with another more suitable extractant. This way, potentially expensive design and production steps of e.g. affinity resins can be avoided. Finally, by filling the whole volume of the particle pores with an extractant (complexing agent), a higher capacity for solutes can be achieved than with ordinary adsorption or ion exchange resins, where only the surface area is available.

However, there are possible drawbacks of SIR technology, such as leaching of the extractant or clogging of a fixed bed by attrition of the particles. These might be remedied by choosing the proper particle-extractant-system. This implies selecting a suitable extractant with low water solubility, which is sufficiently retained inside the pores, and selecting mechanically stable particles as a solid support for the extractant. Additionally, SIRs can be stabilized by coating them, as shown by D. Muraviev et al. As coating material, A. W. Trochimczuk et al. used polyvinyl alcohol.

In order to remove or recover the extracted solute, SIR particles can be regenerated using low pressure steam stripping, which is particularly effective for the recovery of volatile hydrocarbons. However, if the vapor pressure of the extracted solute is too low, or if the complexation between solute and extractant is too strong, other techniques need to be applied, e.g. pH swing.

== Preparation techniques ==
The main impregnation techniques are wet impregnation and dry impregnation. During wet impregnation, the porous particles are dissolved in the extractant and allowed to soak with the respective fluid. In this approach, the particles are either contacted with a precalculated amount of extractant, which completely soaks into the porous matrix, or the particles are contacted with an excess of extractant. After soaking, the remaining extractant, which is not inside the pores, is evaporated.

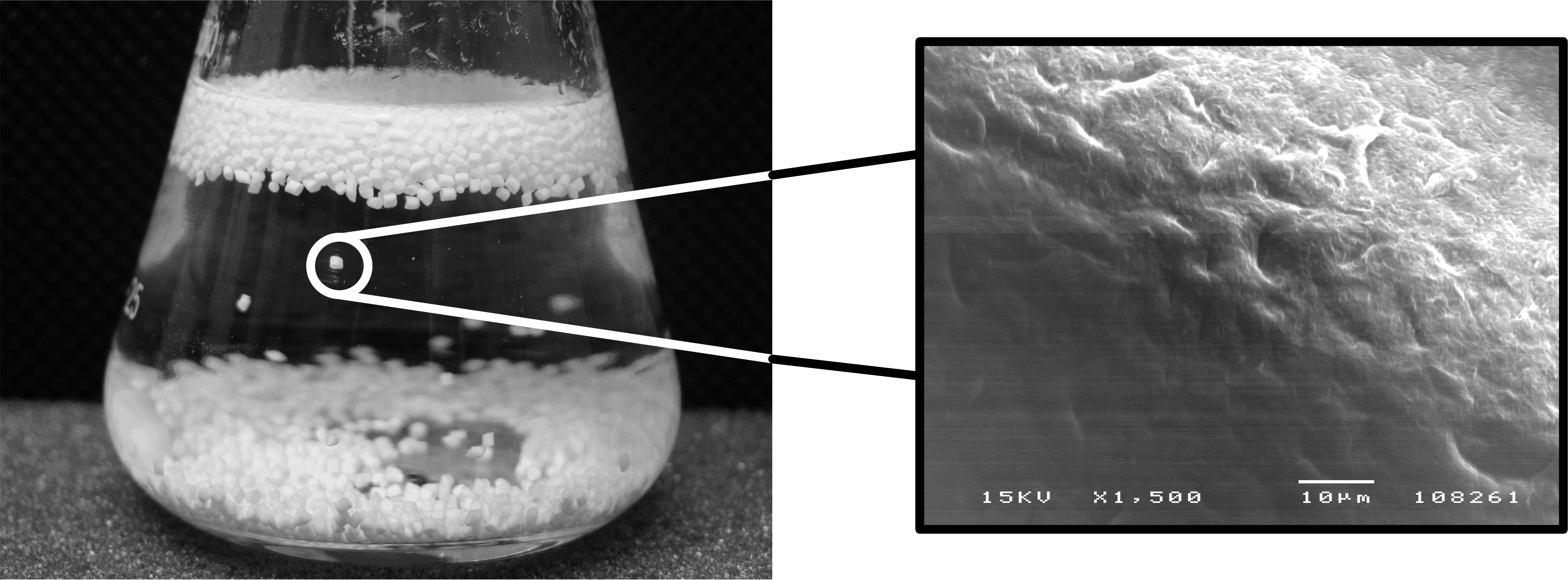
Figure 3: SIR particles prepared with the wet impregnation method, dispersed in water. Cut-out section shows enlarged segment of SIR particle surface.

If the wet method is used, the extractant is dissolved in an additional solvent prior to impregnation. The porous particles are then dispersed in the extractant-solvent solution. After soaking the particles, the excess solvent can either be filtered off or evaporated. In the first case, an extractant-solvent mixture would be retained within the pores. This would be of interest for extractants which would be solid at design conditions when pure. In the second case, only the extractant would remain inside the pores. Figure 3 shows porous particles dispersed in an aqueous solution after wet impregnation. The cut-out in Figure 3 shows an enlarge segment of the surface of such an impregnated particle. An additional, albeit not so frequently used technique is the modifier addition method. This technique relies on the use of an extractant/solvent/modifier system. The additional modifier is supposed to enhance the penetration of the extractant into the particle pores. The solvent is subsequently evaporated, leaving extractant and modifier in the particle pores.

Furthermore, the dynamic column method can be used. The particles are contacted with a solvent until they are completely soaked. This can be done prior or after packing into the column. The packed bed is then rinsed with the liquid extractant until inlet and outlet concentrations are the same. This approach is particularly interesting when particles are already packed in a column and shall be reused for a SIR application.

== Applications ==
=== SIRs in Metal Extraction ===
Mostly, SIRs have been investigated and used for the recovery of heavy metals. Applications include the removal of cadmium, vanadium, copper, chrome, iridium, etc.

=== Extraction of Organics ===
Only recently also other extraction applications have been investigated, e.g. the large scale recovery of apolar organics on offshore oil platforms using the so-called Macro-Porous Polymer Extraction (MPPE) Technology. In such an application, where the SIR particles are contained in a packed bed, flow rates from 0.5 m^{3} h^{−1} upward without maximum flow restrictions can apparently be treated cost competitive to air stripping/activated carbon, steam stripping and bio treatment systems, according to the technology developer. Additional investigations, mostly done in an academic environment, include polar organics like amino-alcohols, organic acids, amino acids, flavonoids, and aldehydes on a bench-scale or pilot-scale. Also, the application of SIRs for the separation of more polar solutes, such as for instance ethers and phenols, has been investigated in the group of A.B. de Haan.

=== Applications in Biotechnology ===
Applications in biotechnology were developed only most recently. This is due to the sensitivity of bioproducts such as proteins towards organic extractants.

One approach by C. van den Berg et al. focuses on the use of impregnated particles for in situ recovery of phenol from Pseudomonas putida fermentations using ionic liquids. Further development led to the use of high capacity polysulfone capsules. These capsules are basically hollow particles surrounded by a membrane. The interior is completely filled with extractant and thus increases the impregnation capacity as compared to classical SIRs.

A completely new approach of using SIRs for the separation or purification of biotechnological products such as proteins is based on the concept of impregnating porous particles with aqueous polymer solutions developed by B. Burghoff. These so-called Tunable Aqueous Polymer-Phase Impregnated Resins (TAPPIR) enhance aqueous two-phase extraction (ATPE) by applying the SIR technology. During classical aqueous two-phase extraction, biotechnological components such as proteins are extracted from aqueous solutions by using a second aqueous phase. This second aqueous phase contains e.g. polyethylene glycol (PEG). On the one hand, a low density difference and low interfacial tension between the two aqueous phases facilitate comparatively fast mass transfer between the phases. On the other hand, PEG appears to stabilize the protein molecules, which results in a comparatively low protein denaturation during the extraction. However, a significant drawback of ATPE is the persistent emulsification, which makes phase separation a challenge. The idea behind TAPPIR is to use the advantages posed by SIRs, namely low extractant loss due to immobilization in the pores and less emulsification than in liquid-liquid extraction. This way, the drawbacks of ATPE could be remedied. The setup would consist of a packed column or a fluidized bed rather than liquid-liquid extraction equipment with additional phase separation steps. Nonetheless, as yet only first feasibility studies are on the way to prove the concept. Adrawback of this method is the non-conitnous working mode. The packed column is run similar as a chromatographic column.
