= Alkaline copper quaternary =

Type of water-based wood preservative

Alkaline copper quaternary, usually abbreviated ACQ, is a type of water-based wood preservative product containing a soluble copper(II) complex and quaternary ammonium alkyl- or aryl-substituted compounds ("quats"). Thus the product was originally called ammoniacal copper/quaternary ammonium.

== Composition ==
=== Copper complex ===
The copper in the preparation is in the form of a soluble complex with ammonia NH_{3} or an amine such as ethanolamine H_{2}N(C_{2}H_{4})OH. In any case, the copper content is usually expressed as a weight percentage of the amount of copper oxide CuO that would account for the copper present.

As a copper carrier, ammonia has the advantage that it will penetrate difficult-to-treat Western species better than other waterborne preservatives. Otherwise ethanolamine is preferred as copper carrier.

=== Quaternary ammonium cations ===
Quaternary ammonium cations

==== DDA ====
The quaternary ammonium cation in some formulations is didecyldimethylammonium (DDA) N^{+}(CH_{3})_{2}(C_{10}H_{21})_{2}.

DDA is commercially produced as the carbonate, under the trade name "Carboquat". The carbonate is used instead of the chloride to reduce corrosion of the treatment equipment.

DDA carbonate is non-volatile and highly soluble in water, with near zero octanol-water partition coefficient.

==== ADBA ====
Another quaternary ammonium cation used in some formulations is alkyldimethylbenzylammonium (ADBA). The formula is N^{+}(CH_{2})_{2}(C_{6}H_{5})(C_{n}H_{2n+1}), where n varies between 8 and 18.

=== Counterions ===
Both the copper complex and the quats are positive cations. The counterions (the anions that balance their positive charges) are typically hydroxide HO^{−}, chloride Cl^{−}, carbonate CO^{2−}_{3} or bicarbonate HCO^{−}_{3}.

=== Standard formulations ===
Formulations of ACQ differ in the "carrier" (complexing agent for copper), either ammonia or ethanolamine; and on the quaternary ammonium cation present. Types registered in the US and Canada:

- ACQ-A: copper-ethanolamine (50% CuO equivalent), and DDA chloride (50%).
- ACQ-B: copper-ammonia (66.7% CuO) and DDA chloride (33.3%). Not currently registered for use in Canada.
- ACQ-C: copper-ammonia and/or copper-ethanolamne (66.7% CuO) and ADBA chloride (30%).
- ACQ-D: copper-ethanolamine (66.7% CuO) and DDA chloride or carbonate (33.3%).

The ACQ Type D formulation also contains two moldicides: 2-methyl-4- isothiazolin-3-one and 5-chloro-2-methyl-4-isothiazolin-3-one.

The ammonia carrier ACQ-B improves its ability to penetrate into wood that is difficult to treat, like some US Western lumber. The formulations with ethanolamine, especially ACQ-D, are generally used for easier woods (such as southern pine) because it provides a more uniform surface appearance.

== Mechanism of action ==
During the wood treatment process, the water-soluble copper and the quaternary ammonium cations are immobilized by the formation of stable insoluble compounds with lignin, cellulose, and hemicellulose and other wood components.

The copper is the primary bactericide and fungicide agent.

The quaternary ammonium cation is added to prevent growth of copper-tolerant bacteria, fungus, and mold, as an insecticide.

== Use ==
ACQ is applied at a timber treatment plants by industrial vacuum-pressure impregnation. Bunks of dried lumber are loaded into a long (up to 150') cylindrical container, seven feet in diameter. The bunks ride on a rail system at the bottom of the cylinder. Once filled, the container is subjected to a hard vacuum, drawing all the air and any remaining moisture out of the wood. Then, the cylinder is filled nearly full of the ACQ solution and a pressure of 150PSI is applied for several hours to force the solution completely into the wood. After the solution has been pumped out, a vacuum is applied again, to remove excess solution from the wood.

Bunk sizes: 2×4 have 294 pcs, 2×6 have 189 pcs, 2×8 YP have 96 pcs, 2×10 YP have 80 pcs, and 2×12 YP have 64 pcs. (YP= Yellow Pine) The lumber is usually eight, twelve, or sixteen feet long, but can be longer.

The ACQ-C product is normally shipped from manufacturer as a concentrated solution that is diluted at the wood treatment plant. ACQ-D and ACQ-A are shipped as two separate solutions that are mixed and diluted at the latter.

In the US and other countries, ACQ is registered for use on lumber, timbers, landscape ties, fence posts, building and utility poles, land, freshwater and marine pilings, sea walls, decking, wood shingles, and other wood structures.

=== Treated wood color ===
Wood treated with ACQ has greenish-brown color which may fade to brown, and may have a slight ammonia odor until the wood dries.

== Safety ==
In the treated wood, the copper is relatively harmless and not an environmental or health concern.

DDA chloride is approved as germicide, fungicide, and algicide for disinfectant products that have been used for decades in hospitals and other commercial and industrial establishments.

ADBA chloride has been used in commercial products in the US since 1947. A registration standard was issued by EPA in 1985.

One disadvantage of ACQ is that significant amounts of air pollution, in the form of ammonia, are released from treatment plants and freshly treated wood in storage yards. While the CCA components are far more toxic in a weight basis, being non-volatile solids they can be effectively contained.

=== Fastener corrosion ===
The copper in ACQ treated wood accelerates corrosion of galvanized steel fasteners (such as nails and screws) 10 times or more in comparison with CCA-treated wood. Stainless steel (AISI 316) is not affected. Aluminium and Galvalum fasteners should be avoided. One should use fasteners made of hot-dipped galvanized steel, copper, or stainless steel.

== History ==
ACQ technology was developed and patented in Canada and improved in the U.S. It has been in commercial production in Europe, Japan and the U.S. since the late 1980s. Wood products treated with ACQ preservative were commercially produced in Canada for the first time in 2004.

ACQ became a widely used wood preservative after concerns were raised about possible environmental contamination by chromium and arsenic from wood treated with chromated copper arsenate (CCA), through contact (especially in playgrounds), leaching, sawing and sanding, or burning. These concerns led to the virtual banning of CCA for residential purposes by the US EPA, in 2003-2004.

Chemical Specialties, Inc (CSI, now Viance) received U.S. Environmental Protection Agency’s Presidential Green Chemistry Challenge Award in 2002 for commercial introduction of ACQ.

== See also ==
- copper azole (CBA), another alternative to CCA.
