= Wood degradation =

Biological process

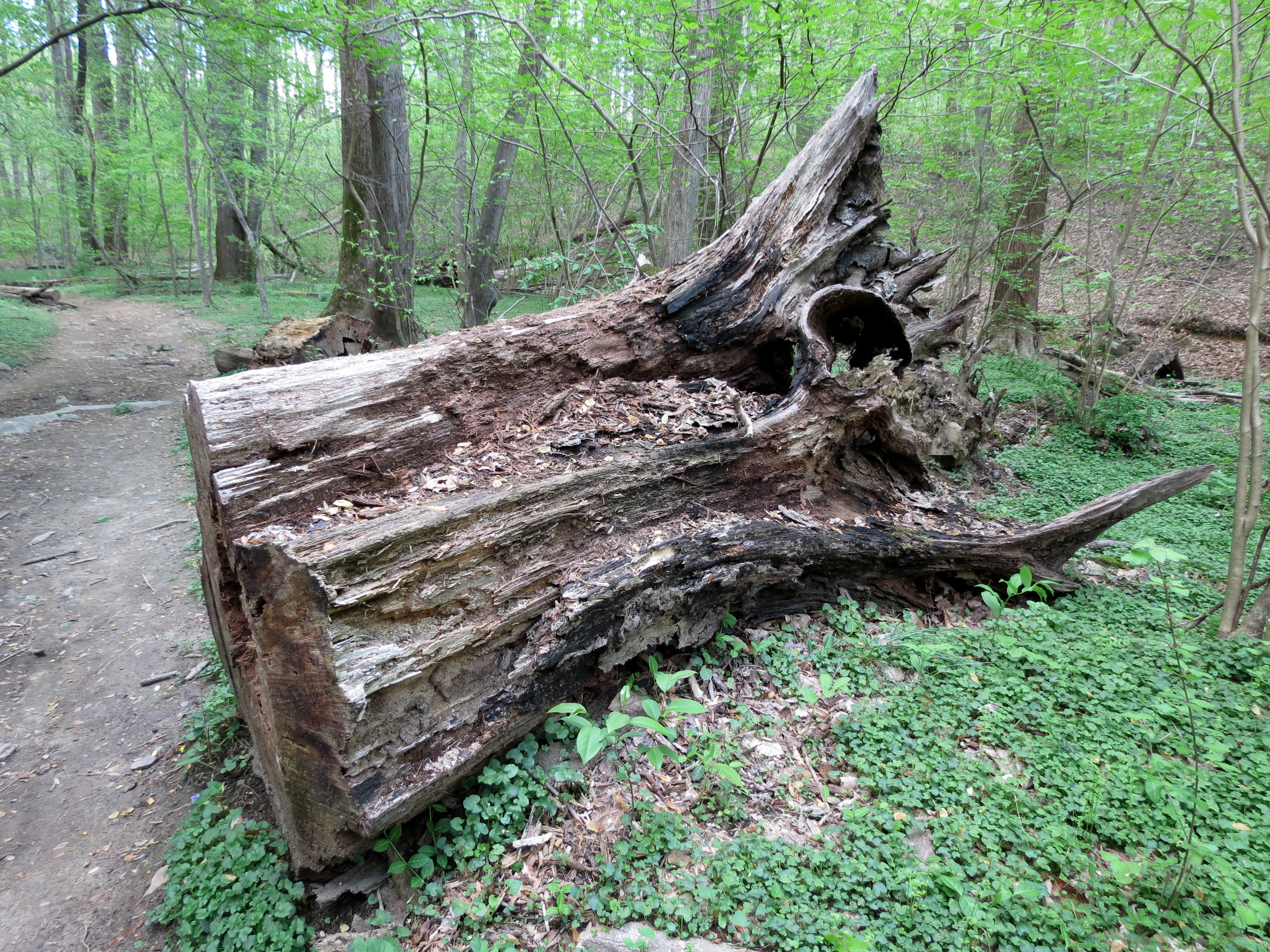
Decaying Wood

Wood degradation is a complex process influenced by various biological, chemical, and environmental factors. It significantly impacts the durability and longevity of wood products and structures, necessitating effective preservation and protection strategies. It primarily involves fungi, bacteria, and insects. Fungi are the most significant agents, causing decay through the breakdown of wood's structural components, such as cellulose, hemicellulose, and lignin. Chemical degradation is likewise significant. Degradation of wood in a concrete matrix is mostly attributed to the effect of alkaline environment and hydrolysis of lignin and hemicellulose and elevated temperatures may accelerate the degradation process of the cell walls.

== Prevention ==
Applying preservatives, such as chromated copper arsenate (CCA) or borates, can protect wood from biological and chemical degradation.

Coatings, such as paints, varnishes, and water repellents, provide a barrier against moisture and UV radiation. Advanced coatings containing UV stabilizers and biocides offer enhanced protection.
