= Chromated copper arsenate =

Wood preservative containing compounds of chromium, copper, and arsenic

Chromated copper arsenate (CCA) is a wood preservative containing compounds of chromium, copper, and arsenic, in various proportions. It is used to impregnate timber and other wood products, especially those intended for outdoor use, in order to protect them from attack by microbes and insects. Like other copper-based wood preservatives, it imparts a greenish tint to treated timber.

CCA was invented in 1933 by Indian chemist Sonti Kamesam, and patented in Britain in 1934. It has been used for timber treatment since the mid-1930s, and is marketed under many trade names.

In 2003, the United States Environmental Protection Agency and the lumber industry agreed to discontinue the use of CCA-treated wood in most residential construction. This agreement was intended to protect the health of humans and the environment by reducing exposure to the arsenic in CCA-treated wood. As a result of this decision, CCA-treated wood can no longer be used to construct residential structures such as playground equipment, decks, picnic tables, landscaping features, fences, patios, and walkways. Acute intoxication due to mishandling of treated products, e.g. by burning, is also a serious concern. Nevertheless, CCA remains a popular and economical option to make perishable timbers, such as plantation-grown pine, viable for applications like poles, piling, retaining structures, etc.

== Composition and application ==
The composition of CCA products is usually described in terms of the mass percentages of chromium trioxide or "chromic acid" CrO_{3}, arsenic pentoxide As_{2}O_{5}, and copper(II) oxide CuO.

The preservative is applied as a water-based mixture containing 0.6–6.0% (by weight) of chromic acid, copper oxide, and arsenic acid (USDA, 1980), with pH 1.6–2.5. The mixture is infused into wood at high pressure.

In the treated wood, arsenic is believed to be in the form of chromium (III) arsenate CrAsO_{4} and/or copper(II) arsenate Cu_{3}(AsO_{4})_{2}, or fairly stable chromium dimer-arsenic clusters.

== Mechanism of action ==
The chromium acts as a chemical fixing agent and has little or no preserving properties; it helps the other chemicals to fix in the timber, binding them through chemical complexes to the wood's cellulose and lignin. The copper acts primarily to protect the wood against decay, fungi, and bacteria, while the arsenic is the main insecticidal component, providing protection from wood-attacking insects including termites and marine borers. It also improves the weather resistance of treated timber and may assist paint adherence in the long term. These compounds are toxic to the human system when inside the bloodstream, usually from burning wood treated with these compounds which is very dangerous.

== Alternatives ==
Alternative heavy-duty preservatives include creosote and pentachlorophenol. Similar water-borne preservatives include alkaline copper quaternary (ACQ) compounds, copper azole (CuAz), ammoniacal copper zinc arsenate (ACZA), copper citrate, and copper HDO (CuHDO). Usually more expensive options, but safer, are pressure and heat treated lumber which contains no chemicals. Usually they lack the long-term robust qualities and resistance of chemically treated lumber. Some may be pressure treated with water alone, which while much more long lived than normal wood, will not repel insects as much as chemically treated but will resist mold and water damage much more than non-treated lumber.

== Safety ==
Concerns over the safety of CCA have focused on its chromium and arsenic contents.

Arsenic is found naturally in the soil, food and water, and is still used to treat some medical conditions. However it has a long list of negative health effects, especially in inorganic form, by contact or by ingestion, and was designated a human carcinogen by the U.S. Environmental Protection Agency (EPA) in 1986 (even though its actual risk as a carcinogen remains unclear). Arsenic in drinking water is a serious public health problem in some areas of the world.

=== Handling ===
Itching, burning rashes, neurological symptoms, and breathing problems have been associated with handling unmarked chromated arsenical wood preservatives, including contact with the sap draining from treated wood.

Regulatory action was motivated in the 1990s by studies suggesting that CCA could pose a risk to children in playgrounds built with CCA-treated timber. Later studies however found that, while concentrations of arsenic in the soil and hand rinses were considerably higher among children who played on CCA-treated playground toys than in the control group, there was no significant difference in the arsenic concentrations in urine and saliva samples.

=== Working ===
Machining (sawing, sanding, drilling) CCA-treated wood also exposes construction workers and amateur carpenters to chronic and acute health risks via inhalation.

=== Animals ===
CCA treated wood has relatively low toxicity, and animals would need to ingest unlikely amounts (28 g daily for a month, for an adult horse) in order to become poisoned. However, ashes from burned timber are much more toxic, and cattle have been poisoned in this way.

Use of CCA-treated wood for beehive construction has been associated with increased levels of arsenic in the honey and winter loss of bee colonies.

=== Releases to the environment ===
Another concern is the leaching of chromium and arsenic from CCA-treated timber and their release to the environment.

The amount and rate of arsenic leaching varies considerably depending on numerous factors, such as local climate, acidity of rain and soil, age of the wood product, and how much CCA was applied. A study has found that soil contamination due to the presence of CCA-treated wood after 45 years was minimal.

Many studies in less aggressive soil types show leaching to be as low as 0.5 ppm (red pine poles in service,) or up to 14 ppm (treated pine in garden beds). Should any chemicals leach from the wood they are likely to bind to soil particles, especially in soils with clay or soils that are more alkaline than neutral.

Sawdust and other residues left over by construction may be a much more significant source of arsenic pollution to soil and environment than leaching from the final timber structure.

=== Burning ===
Acute and chronic arsenicism have been reported to result from inhalation of smoke from burning of CCA-treated wood, such as in the use of scrap timber as fuel for industrial or domestic fires.

=== Regulatory status ===
CCA manufacture and use are regulated by various national and international standards, such as AWPA P23-10 for the US and SANS 673 for South Africa.

In the US, the use of CCA to treat timber for residential use has been banned since December 2003. Timber treated before that date was still allowed to be sold, but retailers were required provide warning labels. Treated timber products already in use, including playsets and decks, were allowed to remain in place. Exceptions to the restrictions were allowed, including the treatment of shakes and shingles, permanent wood foundations, and certain commercial applications. The EPA has also issued regulations for the industrial application of CCA to wood.

CCA has been phased out of residential use also in Canada.

Regulatory agencies in the European Union and Australia also prohibited CCA-treated timber in residential uses, while considering that timber already in place need not be replaced.

In 2003, the Environmental Risk Management Authority in New Zealand decided to not restrict CCA use for any applications, but notes that few well-designed studies have been carried out of those using CCA or CCA-treated timber.

=== Safety recommendations ===
The EPA recommends wearing gloves when handling CCA-treated wood, wearing goggles and masks when sawing or sanding it, and never burning it.

CCA-treated wood should not be used where it may come in contact with food, such as in kitchen tops, cutting boards, or beehives. It should not be exposed to chemicals such as bleaches, acids, soda, etc.

Timber should be inspected for residues of CCA on the surface that could easily be dislodged. Sealants or other coatings will reduce the risk of environmental contamination.

Disposal of scrap and waste CCA-treated timber should be done only in approved incinerators or controlled landfill sites, which are designed to handle potentially toxic wastes such as paints, insecticides, batteries, etc.

== See also ==
- National Pesticide Information Center
- Paris Green
- Scheele's Green
- Timber treatment
- Wood degradation
