= Impregnation resin =

Organic liquids added to wood to enhance its strength

Impregnation resins are slightly viscous, organic liquids that are used in the forest products industry for wood modification. They typically contain formaldehyde and are composed of dimers and trimers of the main molecule. These can become polymer solutions upon curing inside of a wood substrate, imparting stabilizing properties. Impregnation of these resins involves a vacuum chamber procedure that completely disperses the resin into the wood. Once inside of the wood, the resin can diffuse into the cell wall and enhance the physical strength of the wood even further.

== Applications ==
Impregnation resins were designed to be used in the forest products industry to modify wood and enhance its natural properties. Wood impregnation resins typically are designed to end up inside wood cell walls, where they generally increase strength, hardness, dimensional stability, and resistance to decay. In recent years, interest in wood, or lumber, has increased because less energy is needed to convert trees into wood than what is required by other building materials. Although wood does have advantages over other building materials, it also has major disadvantages. Wood swells in high humidity and shrinks when the air is dry. It can also decay if allowed to stay moist for extended periods, and has variable properties from board to board. Resin impregnation can improve all these properties. The impregnation of resins into wood substrate involves a vacuum treatment process that disperses a monomer solution throughout the finer structures inside of the wood. Polymerization of the resin is accomplished by curing with heat, setting the impregnation resin into a solid substance state. Impregnating the wood with resin followed by curing bulks the cell wall of the wood and imparts enhanced properties. Demand for impregnating resins is proliferating across the globe due to increased efficiency in the overall electric insulation process of automotive and electronic parts.

While there are no new commercial developments with impregnation resins for wood modification, there are constant innovations being discovered in industry and research institutes.

== Types of impregnation resins ==
=== Phenol-formaldehyde resins ===
Main products of phenol reacting with formaldehyde in a PF resin: mono-, di-, and trimethylol phenol (left to right)

Phenol-formaldehyde resins (PF) were the first commercially relevant impregnation resins, made by reacting phenol and formaldehyde, creating a polymer network inside of the wood upon curing. Phenol can react with formaldehyde at the ortho and para positions, generating mono, di, and trimethylolphenol as the reaction products. Besides being the first synthetic polymers to be commercialized, studies show that PF resins have superior performance over other resins in terms of imparting strength, stability, and decay resistance to the wood substrate. The dimensional stability displayed by the wood samples impregnated with PF resins is mostly a function of the mass of resin inside the wood cell wall. PF impregnated wood is sometimes called impreg. Before curing, PF resins act as cell wall plasticizer, allowing wood to be compressed more easily. After cure, the PF prevents wood from springing back. This has been used to make high density, very hard wood products, known as “compreg” or “Staybwood”. The increase in both strength and stability of the wood is due to the cross-linking of the resin components and the resin's ability to bulk the cell wall. PF is black, obscuring any natural color of the wood.

=== Urea-formaldehyde resins ===
The basic reaction of urea and formaldehyde to create a urea-formaldehyde resin, followed by the condensation

Urea-formaldehyde resins (UF) are a class of impregnation resins for wood modification made by reacting urea with formaldehyde. This resin can be polymerized after impregnation into the wood substrate by oven-curing. UF resins are beginning to be used less in the wood modification industry due to the fact that they are less durable than other impregnation resins and do not stand up well to harsh weather conditions. When exposed to water, UF resins can hydrolyze to release formaldehyde out of the wood substrate. For this reason, they are mostly used as impregnation resins when the wood substrate will be used for indoor purposes. Wood is modified for outdoor use to improve stability against weather conditions, therefore PF resins are more suitable for this purpose.

=== Melamine-formaldehyde resins ===
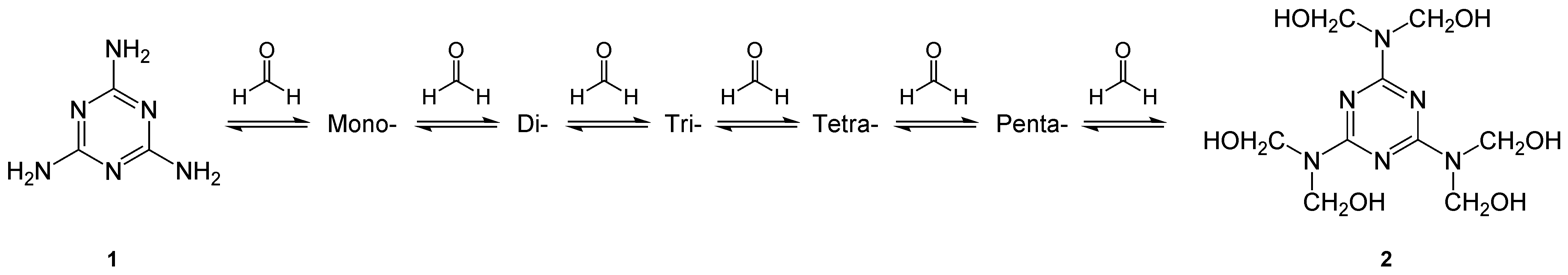
Melamine reacting with formaldehyde to form hexamethylolmelamine

Melamine formaldehyde resins (MF) are a class of impregnation resins for wood modification that are made by reacting melamine with formaldehyde in a condensation of these two monomers. Melamine formaldehyde resins are unique because they have heat and fire-resistant properties that would add extra improvement to wood substrates besides the normal impregnation resin benefits. They are also clear, allowing the finished product to have any color or pattern. This has led to their widespread use, for example in countertops under the trade name formica. The fire-resistant properties are derived from the nitrogen contained in melamine, which releases as a gas when it is exposed to high heat and can extinguish a flame. Melamine is also a heat sink, and this is beneficial because it can absorb a large amount of energy in the form of heat. It further helps the fire-resistant properties because once exposed to flame, melamine forms a layer of char on the wood substrate and this protects the more combustible groups of the wood and the polymer. Although MF resins have this extra benefit, it is difficult to use them for impregnation resins because of the high free formaldehyde content. In industry, there are strict regulations in place to keep the amount of free formaldehyde in any given product below a certain detectable limit. These regulations help keep people and animals coming in contact with these products safe because formaldehyde is an irritant and can be harmful at higher levels. Adding urea to MF resins has been shown to lower the amount of free formaldehyde below the legal limit and is often used for this purpose. Another complication with MF resins is the low solubility of melamine in water. Because of this and the free formaldehyde content, MF resins are not used as commonly in the field of wood modification.

== Resin specifications ==
Impregnation resins are required to have the following properties in order to be successful in wood modification:

=== Ability to flow deeply into the wood ===
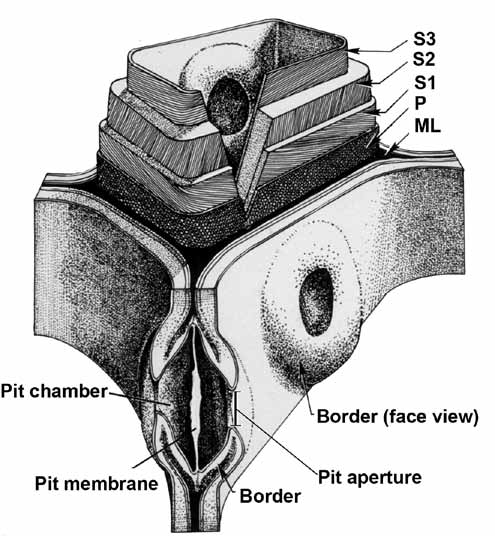
Cut-away drawing of a wood cell wall

The ideal condition for modification by impregnation is to have the resin flow deeply into the wood structure and access all the cells. Most wood cells are shaped like hollow straws, millimeters long and tens of microns wide, with a hollow center. Resin flows through the lumen and pit network, ideally gaining access to all the cells, and then ideally the resin enters the cell walls by diffusion. To flow deeply into the wood, low viscosity resin without particles is necessary because of the long and tortuous path with many narrow points. Even with an ideal resin, pits can be aspirated from drying, keeping all resin out of a cell.

=== Small size of resin molecules ===
There is very little free volume even in water saturated wood cell walls, so large molecules, such as most resins of even at only 1000 molecular weight (~ 5 monomers), cannot enter. The smaller the impregnating molecule, the more mass of resin can be loaded into the cell wall. Having low molecular weight also keeps viscosity low, which improves flow through the lumen and pit structure.

=== Contain soluble/polar components ===
Impregnation resins need to be soluble in polar solvents because they are often diluted with water during the procedure. This is also a key factor because polar solvents help swell the cell wall of the wood and make it easier for the resin to diffuse into the interior of the wall. The resin molecules themselves should also be polar enough to have an affinity to the cell wall and the components of it. The main components of wood's cell wall are cellulose, hemicellulose, and lignin, all of which have polar components that can have an affinity for a polar impregnation resin.

== Impregnation process ==
The most widely used method to saturate wood with impregnation resins is by a vacuum treatment process. This process uses a sealable vessel to contain the wooden samples while they are in treatment. After the samples have been oven-dried and placed into the vessel, a vacuum is pulled up to a certain psi depending on the procedure. Then the resin of choice is introduced into the vessel by a backfilling process and remains in a vacuum pulled state for the amount of time dictated by the procedure. Once the samples have been under vacuum for a sufficient amount of time for the resin to enter the wood the vacuum is released, and the samples remain in the resin solution to allow diffusion to happen. Diffusion is not controlled by the vacuum stage of the process, it is purely controlled by time. If the resin meets all of the required specifications, it will diffuse into the cell wall and the impregnation process will be complete.

== See also ==
- Wood preservation
