= Bioceramic =

Type of ceramic materials that are biocompatible

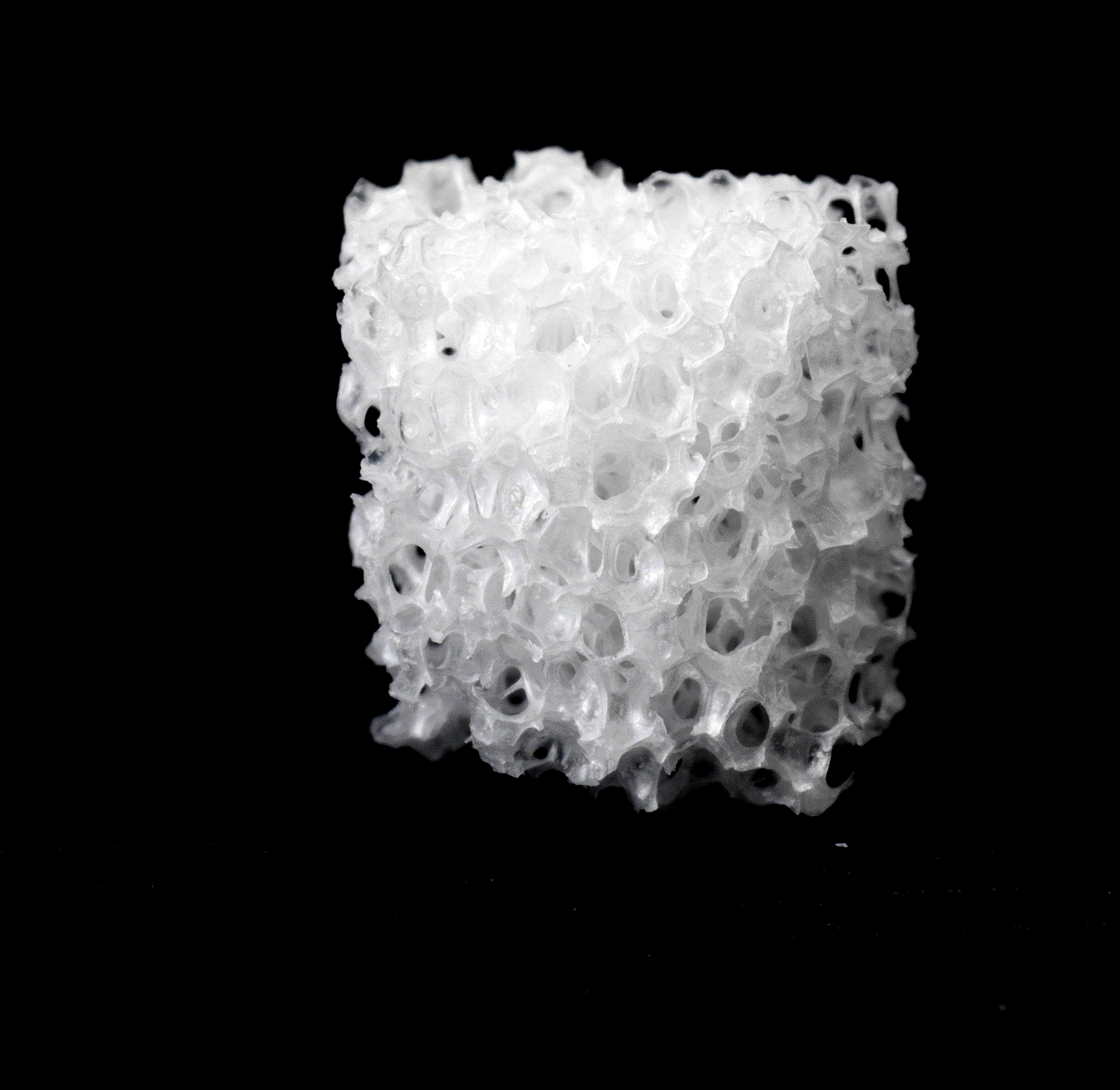
A porous bioceramic granule of an orthobiologic calcium composition manufactured by Cam Bioceramics

Bioceramics and bioglasses are ceramic materials that are biocompatible. Bioceramics are an important subset of biomaterials. Bioceramics range in biocompatibility from the ceramic oxides, which are inert in the body, to the other extreme of resorbable materials, which are eventually replaced by the body after they have assisted repair. Bioceramics are used in many types of medical procedures. Bioceramics are typically used as rigid materials in surgical implants, though some bioceramics are flexible. The ceramic materials used are not the same as porcelain type ceramic materials. Rather, bioceramics are closely related to either the body's own materials or are extremely durable mixed metal oxides.

== History ==
Prior to 1925, the materials used in implant surgery were primarily relatively pure metals. The success of these materials was surprising considering the relatively primitive surgical techniques. The 1930s marked the beginning of the era of better surgical techniques as well as the first use of alloys such as vitallium.

In 1969, L. L. Hench and others discovered that various kinds of glasses and ceramics could bond to living bone. Hench was inspired by the idea on his way to a conference on materials. He was seated next to a colonel who had just returned from the Vietnam War. The colonel shared that after an injury the bodies of soldiers would often reject the implant. Hench was intrigued and began to investigate materials that would be biocompatible. The final product was a new material which he called bioglass. This work inspired a new field called bioceramics. With the discovery of bioglass, interest in bioceramics grew rapidly.

On April 26, 1988, the first international symposium on bioceramics was held in Kyoto, Japan.

== Applications ==
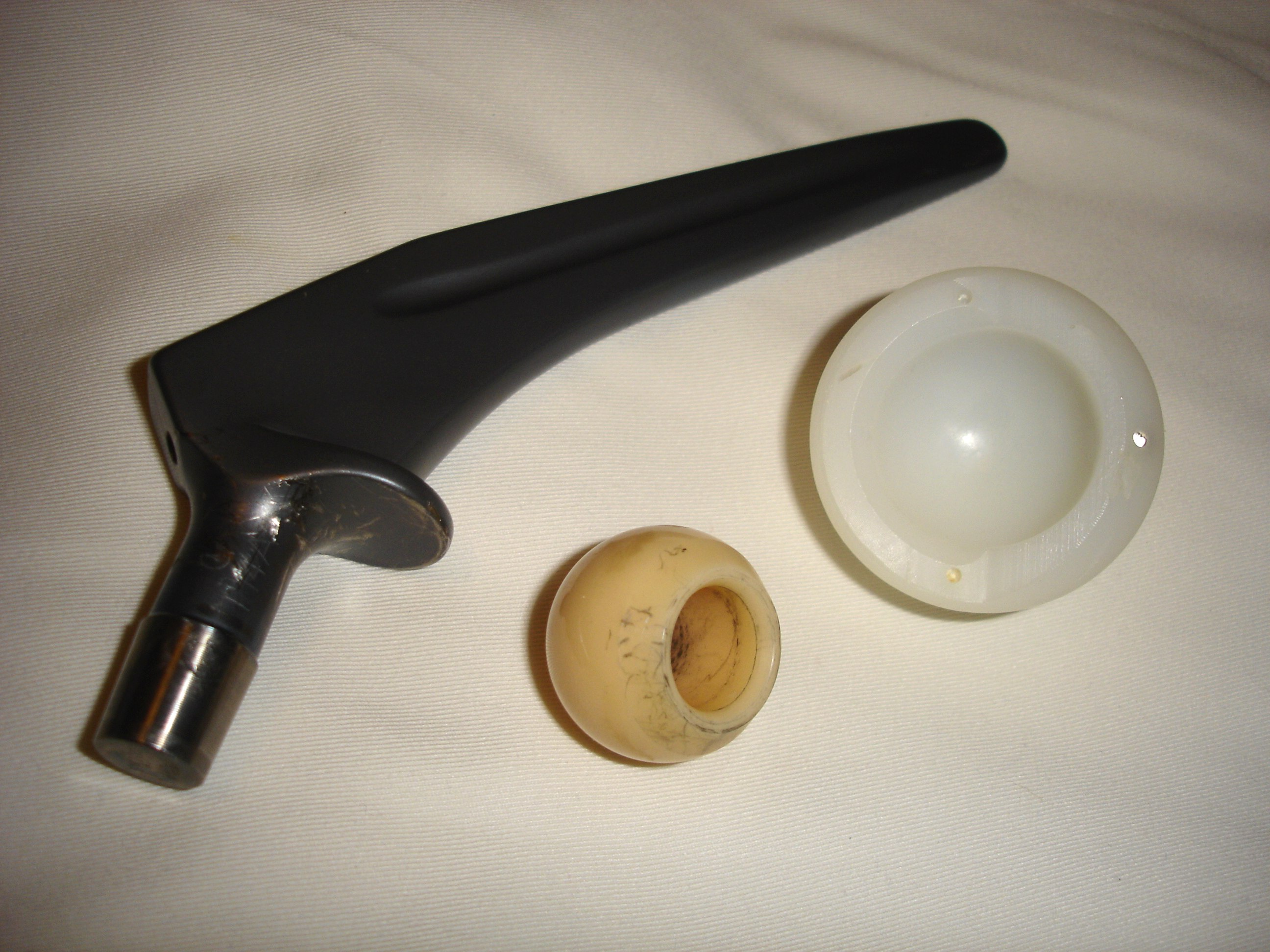
A titanium hip prosthesis, with a ceramic head and polyethylene acetabular cup

Ceramics are now commonly used as dental and bone implants. Surgical cermets are used regularly. Joint replacements are commonly coated with bioceramic materials to reduce wear and inflammatory response. Other examples of medical uses for bioceramics are in pacemakers, kidney dialysis machines, and respirators.

=== Mechanical properties and composition ===
Bioceramics are meant to be used in extracorporeal circulation systems (kidney dialysis, for example) or engineered bioreactors; however, they are most common as implants. Ceramics show numerous applications as biomaterials due to their physico-chemical properties. They have the advantage of being inert in the human body, and their hardness and resistance to abrasion makes them useful for bone and tooth replacement. Some ceramics also have excellent resistance to friction, making them useful as replacement materials for malfunctioning joints. Properties such as appearance and electrical insulation are also a concern for specific biomedical applications.

Some bioceramics incorporate alumina (Al_{2}O_{3}) as their lifespan is longer than that of the patient's. The material can be used in middle ear ossicles, ocular prostheses, electrical insulation for pacemakers, catheter orifices and in numerous prototypes of implantable systems such as cardiac pumps.

Aluminosilicates are commonly used in dental prostheses, pure or in ceramic-polymer composites. The ceramic-polymer composites are a potential way to fill cavities, replacing amalgams suspected to have toxic effects. The aluminosilicates also have a glassy structure. Unlike artificial teeth in resin, the colour of tooth ceramic remains stable. Zirconia doped with yttrium oxide has been proposed as a substitute for alumina for osteoarticular prostheses. The main advantages are a greater failure strength, and a good resistance to fatigue.

Vitreous carbon is also used as it is light, resistant to wear, and compatible with blood. It is mostly used in cardiac valve replacement. Diamond can be used for the same application, but in coating form.

Calcium phosphate-based ceramics constitute, at present, the preferred bone substitute material in orthopaedic and maxillofacial applications, as they are similar to the main mineral phase of bone in structure and chemical composition. Such synthetic bone substitute or scaffold materials are typically porous, which provides an increased surface area that encourages osseointegration, involving cell colonisation and revascularisation. However, such porous materials generally exhibit lower mechanical strength compared to bone, making highly porous implants very delicate. Since the elastic modulus values of ceramic materials are generally higher than that of the surrounding bone tissue, the implant can cause mechanical stresses at the bone interface. Calcium phosphates usually found in bioceramics include hydroxyapatite (HAP) Ca_{10}(PO_{4})_{6}(OH)_{2}; tricalcium phosphate β (β TCP): Ca_{3} (PO_{4})_{2}; and mixtures of HAP and β TCP.

Bioceramics Applications
Devices	Function	Biomaterial
Artificial total hip, knee, shoulder, elbow, wrist	Reconstruct arthritic or fractured joints	High-density alumina, metal bioglass coatings
Bone plates, screws, wires	Repair fractures	Bioglass-metal fibre composite, Polysulphone-carbon fibre composite
Intramedullary nails	Align fractures	Bioglass-metal fibre composite, Polysulphone-carbon fibre composite
Harrington rods	Correct chronic spinal curvature	Bioglass-metal fibre composite, Polysulphone-carbon fibre composite
Permanently implanted artificial limbs	Replace missing extremities	Bioglass-metal fibre composite, Polysulphone-carbon fibre composite
Vertebrae spacers and extensors	Correct congenital deformity	Al_{2}O_{3}
Spinal fusion	Immobilise vertebrae to protect spinal cord	Bioglass
Alveolar bone replacements, mandibular reconstruction	Restore the alveolar ridge to improve denture fit	Polytetrafluoroethylene (PTFE) - carbon composite, porous Al_{2}O_{3}, bioglass, dense-apatite
End osseous tooth replacement implants	Replace diseased, damaged or loosened teeth	Al_{2}O_{3}, Bioglass, dense hydroxyapatite, vitreous carbon
Orthodontic anchors	Provide posts for stress application required to change deformities	Bioglass-coated Al_{2}O_{3}, Bioglass coated vitallium

Mechanical properties of ceramic biomaterials
Material	Young's Modulus (GPa)	Compressive strength (MPa)	Bond strength (GPa)	Hardness	Density (g/cm^{3})
Inert Al_{2}O_{3}	380	4000	300-400	2000-3000 (HV)	>3.9
ZrO_{2} (PS)	150-200	2000	200-500	1000-3000 (HV)	≈6.0
Graphite	20-25	138	NA	NA	1.5-1.9
(LTI) Pyrolitic carbon	17-28	900	270-500	NA	1.7-2.2
Vitreous carbon	24-31	172	70-207	150-200 (DPH)	1.4-1.6
Bioactive HAP	73-117	600	120	350	3.1
Bioglass	≈75	1000	50	NA	2.5
AW Glass Ceramic	118	1080	215	680	2.8
Bone (for comparison)	3-30	130-180	60-160	NA	NA

=== Multipurpose ===
A number of implanted ceramics have not actually been designed for specific biomedical applications. However, they manage to find their way into different implantable systems because of their properties and their good biocompatibility. Among these ceramics, we can cite silicon carbide, titanium nitrides and carbides, and boron nitride. TiN has been suggested as the friction surface in hip prostheses. While cell culture tests show a good biocompatibility, the analysis of implants shows significant wear, related to a delaminating of the TiN layer. Silicon carbide is another modern-day ceramic which seems to provide good biocompatibility and can be used in bone implants.

=== Specific use ===
In addition to being used for their traditional properties, bioactive ceramics have seen specific use for due to their biological activity. Calcium phosphates, oxides, and hydroxides are common examples. Other natural materials — generally of animal origin — such as bioglass and other composites feature a combination of mineral-organic composite materials such as HAP, alumina, or titanium dioxide with the biocompatible polymers (polymethylmethacrylate): PMMA, poly(L-lactic) acid: PLLA, poly(ethylene). Composites can be differentiated as bioresorbable or non-bioresorbable, with the latter being the result of the combination of a bioresorbable calcium phosphate (HAP) with a non-bioresorbable polymer (PMMA, PE). These materials may become more widespread in the future, on account of the many combination possibilities and their aptitude at combining a biological activity with mechanical properties similar to those of the bone.

== Biocompatibility ==
Bioceramics' properties of being anticorrosive, biocompatible, and aesthetic make them quite suitable for medical usage. Zirconia ceramic has bioinertness and noncytotoxicity. Carbon is another alternative with similar mechanical properties to bone, and it also features blood compatibility, no tissue reaction, and non-toxicity to cells. Bioinert ceramics do not exhibit bonding with the bone, known as osseointegration. However, bioactivity of bioinert ceramics can be achieved by forming composites with bioactive ceramics. Bioactive ceramics, including bioglasses must be non-toxic, and form a bond with bone. In bone repair applications, i.e. scaffolds for bone regeneration, the solubility of bioceramics is an important parameter, and the slow dissolution rate of most bioceramics relative to bone growth rates remains a challenge in their remedial usage. Unsurprisingly, much focus is placed on improving dissolution characteristics of bioceramics while maintaining or improving their mechanical properties. Glass ceramics elicit osteoinductive properties, with higher dissolution rates relative to crystalline materials, while crystalline calcium phosphate ceramics also exhibit non-toxicity to tissues and bioresorption. The ceramic particulate reinforcement has led to the choice of more materials for implant applications that include ceramic/ceramic, ceramic/polymer, and ceramic/metal composites. Among these composites ceramic/polymer composites have been found to release toxic elements into the surrounding tissues. Metals face corrosion related problems, and ceramic coatings on metallic implants degrade over time during lengthy applications. Ceramic/ceramic composites enjoy superiority due to similarity to bone minerals, exhibiting biocompatibility and a readiness to be shaped. The biological activity of bioceramics has to be considered under various in vitro and in vivo studies. Performance needs must be considered in accordance with the particular site of implantation.

== Processing ==
Technically, ceramics are composed of raw materials such as powders and natural or synthetic chemical additives, favouring either compaction (hot, cold or isostatic), setting (hydraulic or chemical), or accelerating sintering processes. According to the formulation and shaping process used, bioceramics can vary in density and porosity as cements, ceramic depositions, or ceramic composites. Porosity is often desired in bioceramics including bioglasses. Towards improving the performance of transplanted porous bioceramics, numerous processing techniques are available for the control of porosity, pore size distribution and pore alignment. For crystalline materials, grain size and crystalline defects provide further pathways to enhance biodegradation and osseointegration, which are key for effective bone graft and bone transplant materials. This can be achieved by the inclusion of grain refining dopants and by imparting defects in the crystalline structure through various physical means.

A developing material processing technique based on the biomimetic processes aims to imitate natural and biological processes and offer the possibility of making bioceramics at ambient temperature rather than through conventional or hydrothermal processes [GRO 96]. The prospect of using these relatively low processing temperatures opens up possibilities for mineral organic combinations with improved biological properties through the addition of proteins and biologically active molecules (growth factors, antibiotics, anti-tumor agents, etc.). However, these materials have poor mechanical properties which can be improved, partially, by combining them with bonding proteins.

== Commercial usage ==
Common bioactive materials available commercially for clinical use include 45S5 bioactive glass, A/W bioactive glass ceramic, dense synthetic HA, and bioactive composites such as a polyethylene–HA mixture. All these materials form an interfacial bond with adjacent tissue.

High-purity alumina bioceramics are currently commercially available from various producers. U.K. manufacturer Morgan Advanced Ceramics (MAC) began manufacturing orthopaedic devices in 1985 and quickly became a recognised supplier of ceramic femoral heads for hip replacements. MAC Bioceramics has the longest clinical history for alumina ceramic materials, manufacturing HIP Vitox® alumina since 1985. Some calcium-deficient phosphates with an apatite structure were thus commercialised as "tricalcium phosphate" even though they did not exhibit the expected crystalline structure of tricalcium phosphate.

Currently, numerous commercial products described as HA are available in various physical forms (e.g. granules, specially designed blocks for specific applications). HA/polymer composite (HA/polyethyelene, HAPEXTM) is also commercially available for ear implants, abrasives, and plasma-sprayed coating for orthopedic and dental implants.

Bioceramics are also been used in cannabis or delta 8 devices as wicks for the vaporization of such extracts.

== Future trends ==
Bioceramics have been proposed as a possible treatment for cancer. Two methods of treatment have been proposed: hyperthermia and radiotherapy. Hyperthermia treatment involves implanting a bioceramic material that contains a ferrite or other magnetic material. The area is then exposed to an alternating magnetic field, which causes the implant and surrounding area to heat up. Alternatively, the bioceramic materials can be doped with β-emitting materials and implanted into the cancerous area.

Other trends include engineering bioceramics for specific tasks. Ongoing research involves the chemistry, composition, and micro- and nanostructures of the materials to improve their biocompatibility.

== See also ==
- Ceramic-impregnated fabrics
