= Ceramic-impregnated fabric =

Ceramic-impregnated fabric is a fabric that has been impregnated with ceramic. Nanometric bioceramic can be incorporated into the polymer from which the fabric is manufactured. Bioceramic nanoparticles are added to the fused polymer. Some types of ceramics show thermally-induced photoluminescence, emitting light in the far infrared (FIR) region of the electromagnetic spectrum. When in contact with the body heat, the thermoluminescence of the fabrics with embedded bioceramic is enhanced. Bioceramics presents high reflection coefficient for the infrared radiation.

== Method of production ==
One way in which fabrics can be impregnated with ceramic is the process of electrophoretic deposition or EPD in the industry. In this process, nanoceramic particles are put into a solution in which the fabric to be infiltrated will be placed. The solution is then heated to high temperatures and the fabric is placed into the solution. Next, a current is passed through and the nano ceramic particles coat and impregnate the fabric. The pH level as well as the amount of time and amount of current can affect how well the fabric is infiltrated and how it is coated. Other processing methods can be further broken down into what particles will be added. There are two distinct groups:

- The SiC group (which contains silicon, carbon as well as additives for oxidation processes). When using this group for the purpose of ceramic-impregnation, the textile must first undergo a treatment. This is usually pyrolytic carbon or BN, which is deposited using a chemical vapor infiltration (CVI). Next, an overlayer of SiC is deposited on the textile using the same method. After this step the matrix of the textile is infiltrated by a slurry made up of SiC particles which can either be put in a polymer or simply molten SiC. This process coats the entirety of the textile.
- The oxide group. Oxides commonly used are alumina, silica, mullite, and rare-earth phosphates. The process for impregnation is quite simple: a slurry is prepared with the oxide desired and the textile is placed in it. Again, the slurry can be a molten state or a polymer-based one.

There are a few differences between these groups. The SiC group has over twice the fracture strength and thermal conductivity when compared to the oxides group. However, the oxides are more stable in combustion and oxidizing environments. The process by which the textile is impregnated depends on what materials will be used, as well as the intended purpose of that fabric.

== Uses ==
These fabrics are utilized for thermal, mechanical and electrical applications for a variety of reasons. Ceramic-impregnated fabrics are most importantly used in three main fields: aerospace, electronic, and industrial. In aerospace, the fabrics were used in Space Shuttles for the exit cone, door seals, micrometeorite shield, gaskets, booster access doors, shuttle tiles, and in the Whipple shield. Ceramic-impregnated fabrics are utilized in aerospace because they have low thermal conductivity and can be fabricated into high temperature thermal insulators. In the electronic industry, the fabrics are used primarily for insulation and seals, because of its low porosity. Ceramic fabric's industrial uses include furnace linings, furnace zone dividers, door seals, tube seals, gaskets, and expansion joints. In addition to being an effective thermal insulator, these fabrics do not shrink or elongate with high temperature changes, making them useful for industrial uses that involve high temperatures.
