= Silicone impregnated refractory ceramic ablator =

Silicone Impregnated Refractory Ceramic Ablator, or SIRCA, is a lightweight ceramic ablative material, often used in thermal protection systems to protect parts of launch vehicles and spacecraft from very high temperature heat sources.

SIRCA was used for ceramic substrates on both the Viking spacecraft and the Space Shuttle, and was also used on the aeroshells for Mars Pathfinder and the Mars Exploration Rovers. It was developed at NASA Ames Research Center in the 1980s and 1990s.

== Types ==
According to NASA's TPSX database, there are three types of SIRCA in use: SIRCA-25L, SIRCA-15F and SIRCA-14A, each based on a different ceramic insulation substrate. Each type of SIRCA has a different acceptable heating rate, maximum heating load and mechanical strength.

== Description ==
SIRCA typically has a density between 0.20–0.40 grams per cubic centimetre (12–25 lb/cu ft) and can handle a heat flux of up to 300 watts per square centimetre (2.6 hp/sq in) and is easily machined to custom shapes.
