= SIRCA =

- Founded: 1997
- Founder: Michael Aitken
- Type: Not-for-profit organization with the Australian Securities & Investments Commission
- Purpose: Data Science, E-Science, Open Innovation, Computational finance, Enabling Technologies
- Location: Sydney, Australia
- Region served: Global
- Key people: David Sharp, CEO; Gail Pemberton-Burke, Chair
- Website: www.sirca.org.au

SIRCA is a provider of online services to support finance and other data-intensive research at universities, Government and financial market participants world-wide.

== History ==
SIRCA was incorporated in 1997 as a not-for-profit company to host and manage share price data from the Australian Securities Exchange (ASX) for a small group of collaborating Australian universities.

In its early years, SIRCA collaborated with the ASX and other research partners on a number of landmark studies including:

- ASIC review of the research on the past performance of managed funds [2002]
- The ASX-SIRCA Benchmarking Study [2003]
- The Importance of Market Integrity [2004]
- Identity Fraud in Australia [2003]
  A report for financial intelligence agency AUSTRAC which found it to be $1.1Bn problem.

Today, SIRCA serves over 50 universities including 37 member universities in Australia and New Zealand and over 20 from North America, Europe and Asia.

== Services ==
SIRCA in partnership with the Australian Financial Markets Association produces the Australian Financial Markets Report (AFMR) - an annual report with comprehensive coverage and statistics on all Australia's financial markets including equities, futures, bonds and over-the-counter securities. In 2012, these markets collectively turned over collectively turned over more than $125 trillion in 2011-12.

SIRCA technology underpins the market leading Thomson Reuters Tick History database. This is used by most leading financial institutions around the world as a source of historical tick and end of day data for a variety of functions, including the back testing of algorithms to support automated trading strategies, and for a range of risk and compliance related tasks.

== Governance ==
SIRCA is a registered as a not-for-profit company limited by guarantee with the Australian company regulator Australian Securities & Investments Commission (ASIC). SIRCA’s governance is overseen by a Board of Directors, and Executive.

== See also ==
- Australian Securities Exchange (ASX)
- Thomson Reuters
- Reserve Bank of Australia
- Australian Transaction Reports and Analysis Centre
