= Wood preservation =

Treatment or process aimed at extending the service life of wood structures

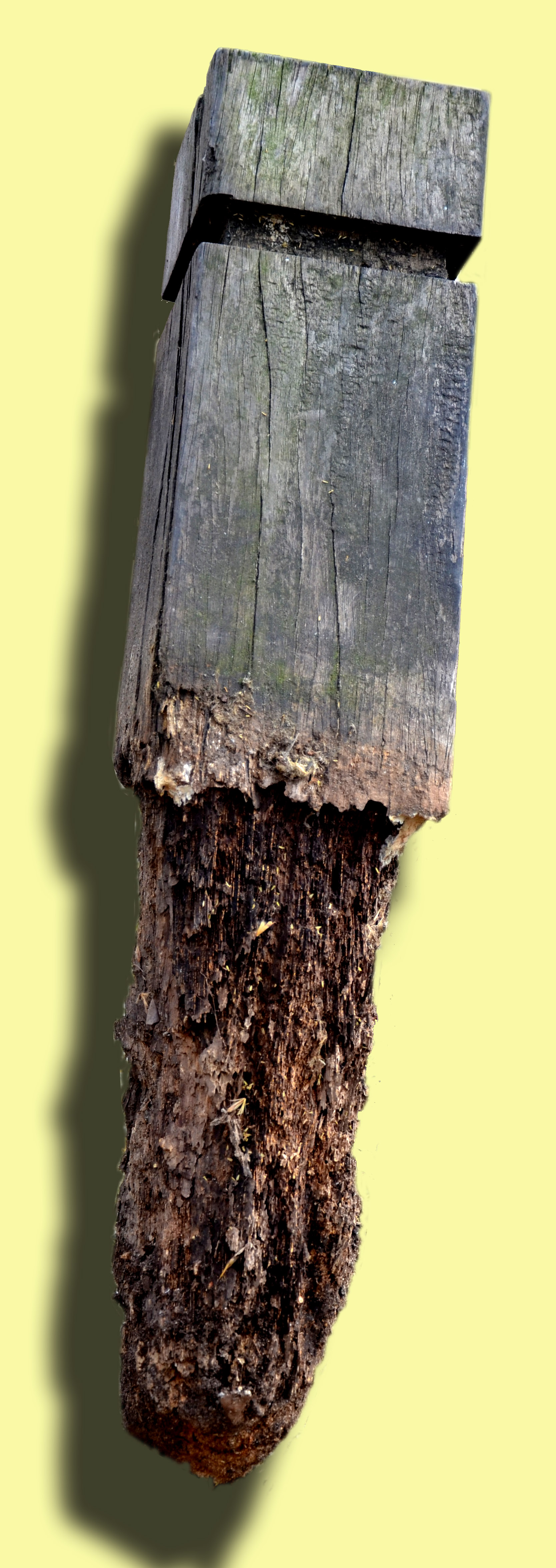
In moist and oxygenated soil, there are few treatments that enable vulnerable wood (softwood here) to resist for long against bacterial or fungal degradation

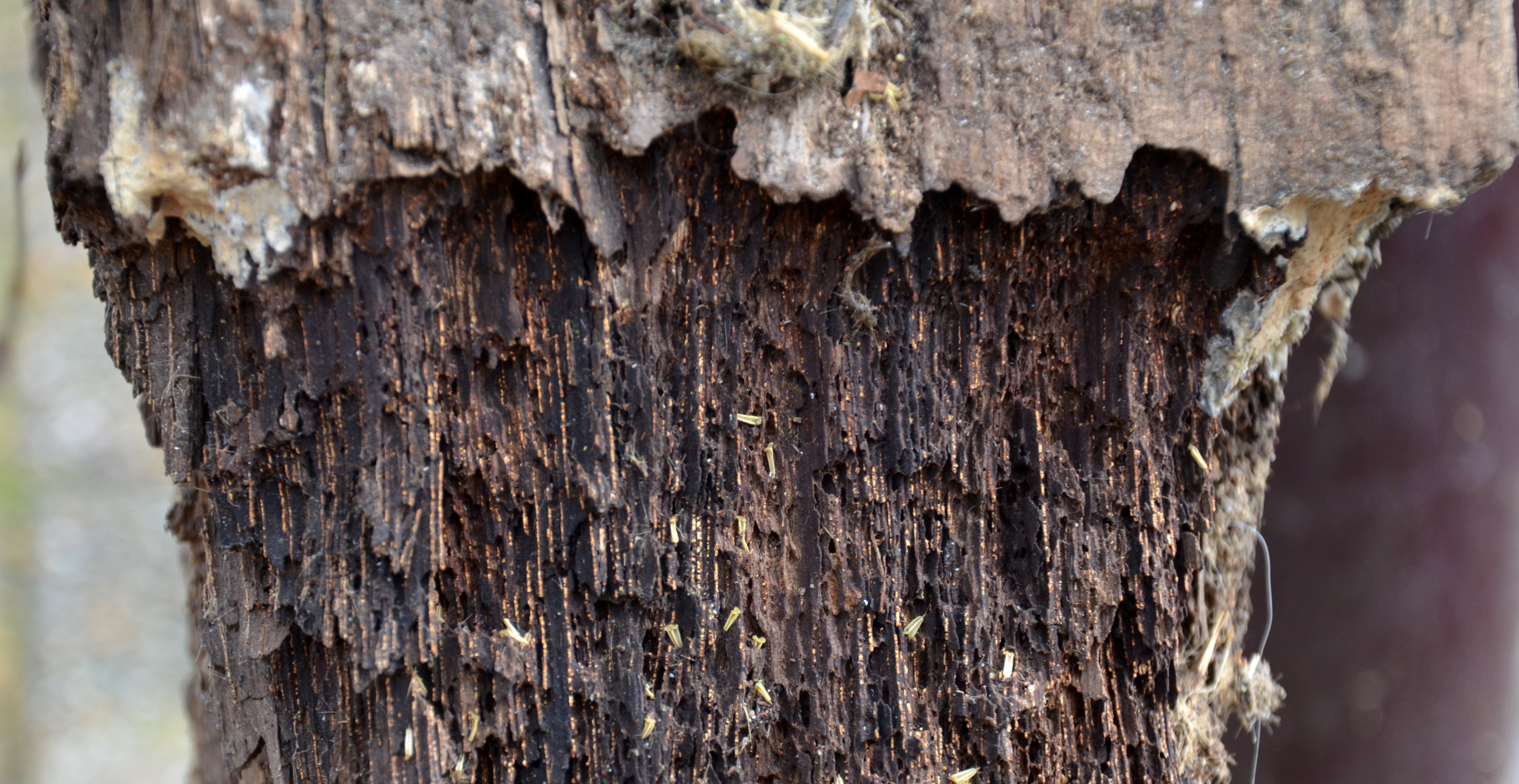
Detail of sample in photo above

Wood preservation refers to any method or process, or even technique, used to protect wood and extend its service life.

Most wood species are susceptible to both biological (biotic) and non-biological (abiotic) factors that cause decay and/or deterioration. Only a limited number of wood species possess natural durability, and even those may not be suitable for all environments. In general, wood benefits from appropriate preservation measures.

In addition to structural design considerations, a variety of chemical preservatives and treatment processes — commonly known as timber treatment, lumber treatment, pressure treatment or modification treatment — are used to enhance the durability of wood and wood-based products, including engineered wood. These treatments may involve physical, chemical, thermal, and/or biological methodology aimed at protecting wood from degradation. They increase its resistance to biological agents such as fungi, termites, and insects, as well as non-biotic factors such as ultraviolet radiation (sunlight), moisture and wet-dry cycling, temperature extremes, mechanical wear, exposure to chemicals, and fire or heat. Effective preservation treatments significantly improve the durability, structural integrity, and overall performance of wood in service.

== History ==
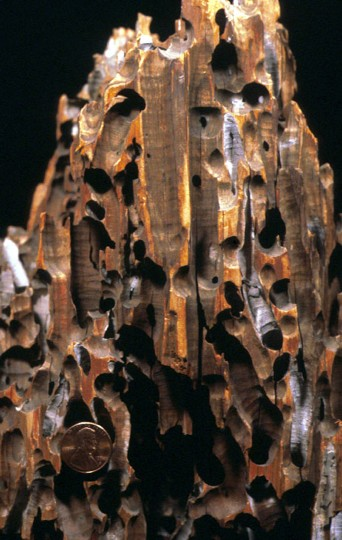
A modern wharf piling bored by bivalves known as shipworms.

As proposed by Richardson, treatment of wood has been practiced for almost as long as the use of wood itself. There are records of wood preservation reaching back to ancient Greece during Alexander the Great's rule, where bridge wood was soaked in olive oil. The Romans protected their ship hulls by brushing the wood with tar. During the Industrial Revolution, wood preservation became a cornerstone of the wood processing industry. Inventors and scientists such as Bethell, Boucherie, Burnett and Kyan made historic developments in wood preservation, with preservative solutions and processes. Commercial pressure treatment began in the latter half of the 19th century with the protection of railroad cross-ties using creosote. Treated wood was used primarily for industrial, agricultural, and utility applications, where it is still used, until its use grew considerably (at least in the United States) in the 1970s, as homeowners began building decks and backyard projects. Innovation in treated timber products continues to this day, with consumers becoming more interested in less toxic materials.

== Hazards ==
Wood that has been industrially pressure-treated with approved preservative products poses a limited risk to the public and should be disposed of properly. On December 31, 2003, the U.S. wood treatment industry stopped treating residential lumber with arsenic and chromium (chromated copper arsenate, or CCA). This was a voluntary agreement with the United States Environmental Protection Agency. CCA was replaced by copper-based pesticides, with exceptions for certain industrial uses. CCA may still be used for outdoor products like utility trailer beds and non-residential construction like piers, docks, and agricultural buildings. Industrial wood preservation chemicals are generally not available directly to the public and may require special approval to import or purchase, depending on the product and the jurisdiction where being used. In most countries, industrial wood preservation operations are notifiable industrial activities that require licensing from relevant regulatory authorities such as EPA or equivalent. Reporting and licensing conditions vary widely, depending on the particular chemicals used and the country of use.

Although pesticides are used to treat lumber, preserving lumber protects natural resources (in the short term) by enabling wood products to last longer. Previous poor practices in industry have left legacies of contaminated ground and water around wood treatment sites in some cases. However, under currently approved industry practices and regulatory controls, such as implemented in Europe, North America, Australia, New Zealand, Japan and elsewhere, environmental impact of these operations should be minimal.

Wood treated with modern preservatives is generally safe to handle, given appropriate handling precautions and personal protection measures. However, treated wood may present certain hazards in some circumstances, such as during combustion or where loose wood dust particles or other fine toxic residues are generated, or where treated wood comes into direct contact with food and agriculture.

Preservatives containing copper in the form of microscopic particles have recently been introduced to the market, usually with "micronized" or "micro" trade names and designations such as MCQ or MCA. The manufacturers represent that these products are safe and EPA has registered these products.

The American Wood Protection Association (AWPA) recommends that all treated wood be accompanied by a Consumer Information Sheet (CIS), to communicate safe handling and disposal instructions, as well as potential health and environmental hazards of treated wood. Many producers have opted to provide Material Safety Data Sheets (MSDS) instead. Although the practice of distributing MSDS instead of CIS is widespread, there is an ongoing debate regarding the practice and how to best communicate potential hazards and hazard mitigation to the end-user. Neither MSDS nor the newly adopted International Safety Data Sheets (SDS) are required for treated lumber under current U.S. Federal law.

== Chemical ==
In general, the chemical preservatives can be classified into three broad categories:

- water-borne preservatives
- oil-borne preservatives
- light organic solvent preservatives (LOSPs)

In recent years, another fourth category of chemical preservatives for wood, is based upon nanocompounds (i.e. nanometals of boron, copper, silver).

=== Micronized copper ===
Particulate (micronised or dispersed) copper preservative technology has been introduced in the US and Europe. In these systems, copper is ground into micro sized particles and suspended in water rather than dissolved, as is the case with other copper products such as ACQ and copper azole. There are two particulate copper systems in production. One system uses a quat biocide system (known as MCQ) and is a derivative of ACQ. The other uses an azole biocide (known as MCA or μCA-C) derived from copper azole.

Two particulate copper systems, one marketed as MicroPro and the other as Wolmanized using μCA-C formulation, have achieved Environmentally Preferable Product (EPP) certification. The EPP certification was issued by Scientific Certifications Systems (SCS) and is based on a comparative life-cycle impact assessments with an industry standard.

The copper particle size used in the "micronized" copper beads ranges from 1 to 700 nm with an average under 300 nm. Larger particles (such as actual micron-scale particles) of copper do not adequately penetrate the wood cell walls. These micronized preservatives use nano particles of copper oxide or copper carbonate, for which there are alleged safety concerns. An environmental group petitioned EPA in 2011 to revoke the registration of the micronized copper products, citing safety issues.

==== Alkaline copper quaternary ====
Alkaline copper quaternary (ACQ) is a preservative made of copper, a fungicide, and a quaternary ammonium compound (quat) like didecyl dimethyl ammonium chloride, an insecticide which also augments the fungicidal treatment. ACQ has come into wide use in the US, Europe, Japan and Australia following restrictions on CCA. Its use is governed by national and international standards, which determine the volume of preservative uptake required for a specific timber end use.

Since it contains high levels of copper, ACQ-treated timber is five times more corrosive to common steel. It is necessary to use fasteners meeting or exceeding requirements for ASTM A 153 Class D, such as ceramic-coated, as mere galvanized and even common grades of stainless steel corrode. The U.S. began mandating the use of non-arsenic containing wood preservatives for virtually all residential use timber in 2004.

The American Wood Protection Association (AWPA) standards for ACQ require a retention of 0.15 lb/cu ft (2.4 kg/m^{3}) for above ground use and 0.40 lb/cu ft (6.4 kg/m^{3}) for ground contact.

Chemical Specialties, Inc (CSI, now Viance) received U.S. Environmental Protection Agency's Presidential Green Chemistry Challenge Award in 2002 for commercial introduction of ACQ. Its widespread use has eliminated major quantities of arsenic and chromium previously contained in CCA.

==== Copper azole ====
Copper azole preservative (denoted as CA-B and CA-C under American Wood Protection Association/AWPA standards) is a major copper based wood preservative that has come into wide use in Canada, the US, Europe, Japan and Australia following restrictions on CCA. Its use is governed by national and international standards, which determine the volume of preservative uptake required for a specific timber end use.

Copper azole is similar to ACQ with the difference being that the dissolved copper preservative is augmented by an azole co-biocide like organic triazoles such as tebuconazole or propiconazole, which are also used to protect food crops, instead of the quat biocide used in ACQ. The azole co-biocide yields a copper azole product that is effective at lower retentions than required for equivalent ACQ performance. The general appearance of wood treated with copper azole preservative is similar to CCA with a green colouration.

Copper azole treated wood is marketed widely under the Preserve CA and Wolmanized brands in North America, and the Tanalith brand across Europe and other international markets.

The AWPA standard retention for CA-B is 0.10 lb/cu ft (1.6 kg/m^{3}) for above ground applications and 0.21 lb/cu ft (3.4 kg/m^{3}) for ground contact applications. Type C copper azole, denoted as CA-C, has been introduced under the Wolmanized and Preserve brands. The AWPA standard retention for CA-C is 0.06 lb/cu ft (0.96 kg/m^{3}) for above ground applications and 0.15 lb/cu ft (2.4 kg/m^{3}) for ground contact applications.

=== Copper naphthenate ===
Copper naphthenate, invented in Denmark in 1911, has been used effectively for many applications including: fencepost, canvas, nets, greenhouses, utility poles, railroad ties, beehives, and wooden structures in ground contact. Copper naphthenate is registered with the EPA as a non-restricted use pesticide, so there is no federal applicators licensing requirements for its use as a wood preservative. Copper Naphthenate can be applied by brush, dip, or pressure treatment.

The University of Hawaii has found that copper naphthenate in wood at loadings of 1.5 lb/cu ft (24 kg/m^{3}) is resistant to Formosan termite attack. On February 19, 1981, the Federal Register outlined the EPA's position regarding the health risks associated with various wood preservatives. As a result, the National Park Service recommended the use of copper naphthenate in its facilities as an approved substitute for pentachlorophenol, creosote, and inorganic arsenicals. A 50-year study presented to AWPA in 2005 by Mike Freeman and Douglas Crawford says, "This study reassessed the condition of the treated wood posts in southern Mississippi, and statistically calculated the new expected post life span. It was determined that commercial wood preservatives, like pentachlorophenol in oil, creosote, and copper naphthenate in oil, provided excellent protection for posts, with life spans now calculated to exceed 60 years. Surprisingly, creosote and penta treated posts at 75% of the recommended AWPA retention, and copper naphthenate at 50% of the required AWPA retention, gave excellent performance in this AWPA Hazard Zone 5 site. Untreated southern pine posts lasted 2 years in this test site."

The AWPA M4 Standard for the care of preservative-treated wood products, reads, "The appropriateness of the preservation system for field treatment shall be determined by the type of preservative originally used to protect the product and the availability of a field treatment preservative. Because many preservative products are not packaged and labeled for use by the general public, a system different from the original treatment may need to be utilized for field treatment. Users shall carefully read and follow the instructions and precautions listed on the product label when using these materials. Copper naphthenate preservatives containing a minimum of 2.0% copper metal are recommended for material originally treated with copper naphthenate, pentachlorophenol, creosote, creosote solution or waterborne preservatives." The M4 Standard has been adopted by the International Code Council's (ICC) 2015 International Building Code (IBC) section 2303.1.9 Preservative-treated Wood, and 2015 International Residential Code (IRC) R317.1.1 Field Treatment. The American Association of State Highway and Transportation Officials AASHTO has also adopted the AWPA M4 Standard.

A waterborne copper naphthenate is sold to consumers under the tradename QNAP 5W. Oilborne copper naphthenates with 1% copper as metal solutions are sold to consumers under the tradenames Copper Green, and Wolmanized Copper Coat, a 2% copper as metal solution is sold under the tradename Tenino.

=== Chromated copper arsenate (CCA) ===
In CCA treatment, copper is the primary fungicide, arsenic is a secondary fungicide and an insecticide, and chromium is a fixative which also provides ultraviolet (UV) light resistance. Recognized for the greenish tint it imparts to timber, CCA is a preservative that was very common for many decades.

In the pressure treatment process, an aqueous solution of CCA is applied using a vacuum and pressure cycle, and the treated wood is then stacked to dry. During the process, the mixture of oxides reacts to form insoluble compounds, helping with leaching problems.

The process can apply varying amounts of preservative at varying levels of pressure to protect the wood against increasing levels of attack. Increasing protection can be applied (in increasing order of attack and treatment) for: exposure to the atmosphere, implantation within soil, or insertion into a marine environment.

In the last decade concerns were raised that the chemicals may leach from the wood into surrounding soil, resulting in concentrations higher than naturally occurring background levels. A study cited in Forest Products Journal found 12–13% of the chromated copper arsenate leached from treated wood buried in compost during a 12-month period. Once these chemicals have leached from the wood, they are likely to bind to soil particles, especially in soils with clay or soils that are more alkaline than neutral. In the United States the US Consumer Product Safety Commission issued a report in 2002 stating that exposure to arsenic from direct human contact with CCA treated wood may be higher than was previously thought. On 1 January 2004, the Environmental Protection Agency (EPA) in a voluntary agreement with industry began restricting the use of CCA in treated timber in residential and commercial construction, with the exception of shakes and shingles, permanent wood foundations, and certain commercial applications. This was in an effort to reduce the use of arsenic and improve environmental safety, although the EPA were careful to point out that they had not concluded that CCA treated wood structures in service posed an unacceptable risk to the community. The EPA did not call for the removal or dismantling of existing CCA treated wood structures.

In Australia, the Australian Pesticides and Veterinary Medicines Authority (APVMA) restricted the use of CCA preservative for treatment of timber used in certain applications from March 2006. CCA may no longer be used to treat wood used in 'intimate human contact' applications such as children's play equipment, furniture, residential decking and handrailing. Use for low contact residential, commercial and industrial applications remains unrestricted, as does its use in all other situations. The APVMA decision to restrict the use of CCA in Australia was a precautionary measure, even though the report found no evidence that demonstrated CCA treated timber posed unreasonable risks to humans in normal use. Similarly to the US EPA, the APVMA did not recommend dismantling or removal of existing CCA treated wood structures.

In Europe, Directive 2003/2/EC restricts the marketing and use of arsenic, including CCA wood treatment. CCA treated wood is not permitted to be used in residential or domestic constructions. It is permitted for use in various industrial and public works, such as bridges, highway safety fencing, electric power transmission and telecommunications poles. In the United Kingdom waste timber treated with CCA was classified in July 2012 as hazardous waste by the department for the Environment, Food and Rural Affairs.

=== Other copper compounds ===
These include copper HDO (Bis-(N-cyclohexyldiazeniumdioxy)-copper or CuHDO), copper chromate, copper citrate, acid copper chromate, and ammoniacal copper zinc arsenate (ACZA). The CuHDO treatment is an alternative to CCA, ACQ and CA used in Europe and in approval stages for United States and Canada. ACZA is generally used for marine applications.

=== Borate ===
Boric acid, oxides and salts (borates) are effective wood preservatives and are supplied under numerous brand names throughout the world. One of the most common compounds used is disodium octaborate tetrahydrate Na_{2}B_{8}O_{13}·4H_{2}O, commonly abbreviated DOT. Borate treated wood is of low toxicity to humans, and does not contain copper or other heavy metals. However, unlike most other preservatives, borate compounds do not become fixed in the wood and can be partially leached out if exposed repeatedly to water that flows away rather than evaporating (evaporation leaves the borate behind so is not a problem). Even though leaching will not normally reduce boron concentrations below effective levels for preventing fungal growth, borates should not be used where they will be exposed to repeated rain, water or ground contact unless the exposed surfaces are treated to repel water. Zinc-borate compounds are less susceptible to leaching than sodium-borate compounds, but are still not recommended for below-ground use unless the timber is first sealed. Recent interest in low toxicity timber for residential use, along with new regulations restricting some wood preservation agents, has resulted in a resurgence of the use of borate treated wood for floor beams and internal structural members. Researchers at CSIRO in Australia have developed organoborates which are much more resistant to leaching, while still providing timber with good protection from termite and fungal attack. The cost of the production of these modified borates will limit their widespread take-up but they are likely to be suitable for certain niche applications, especially where low mammalian toxicity is of paramount importance.

=== PTI ===
Recent concerns about the health and environmental effects of metallic wood preservatives have created a market interest in non-metallic wood preservatives such as propiconazole-tebuconazole-imidacloprid better known as PTI. The American Wood Protection Association (AWPA) standards for PTI require a retention of 0.018 lb/cu ft (0.29 kg/m^{3}) for above ground use and 0.013 lb/cu ft (0.21 kg/m^{3}) when applied in combination with a wax stabilizer. The AWPA has not developed a standard for a PTI ground contact preservative, so PTI is currently limited to above ground applications such as decks. All three of the PTI components are also used in food crop applications. The very low required amounts of PTI in pressure treated wood further limits effects and substantially decreases the freight costs and associated environmental impacts for shipping preservative components to the pressure treating plants.

The PTI preservative imparts very little color to the wood. Producers generally add a color agent or a trace amount of copper solution so as to identify the wood as pressure treated and to better match the color of other pressure treated wood products. The PTI wood products are very well adapted for paint and stain applications with no bleed-through. The addition of the wax stabilizer allows a lower preservative retention plus substantially reduces the tendency of wood to warp and split as it dries. In combination with normal deck maintenance and sealer applications, the stabilizer helps maintain appearance and performance over time. PTI pressure treated wood products are no more corrosive than untreated wood and are approved for all types of metal contact, including aluminum.

PTI pressure treated wood products are relatively new to the market place and are not yet widely available in building supply stores. However, there are some suppliers selling PTI products for delivery anywhere in the US on a job lot order basis.

=== Sodium silicate ===
Sodium silicate is produced by fusing sodium carbonate with sand or heating both ingredients under pressure. It has been in use since the 19th century. It can be a deterrent against insect attack and possesses minor flame-resistant properties; however, it is easily washed out of wood by moisture, forming a flake-like layer on top of the wood.

Timber Treatment Technology, LLC, markets TimberSIL, a sodium silicate wood preservative. The TimberSIL proprietary process surrounds the wood fibers with a protective, non-toxic, amorphous glass matrix. The result is a product the company calls "Glass Wood," which they claim is Class A fire-retardant, chemically inert, rot and decay resistant, and superior in strength to untreated wood. Timbersil is currently involved in litigation over its claims.

=== Potassium silicate ===
There are a number of European natural paint fabricants that have developed potassium silicate (potassium waterglass) based preservatives. They frequently include boron compounds, cellulose, lignin and other plant extracts. They are a surface application with a minimal impregnation for internal use.

=== Bifenthrin spray ===
In Australia, a water-based bifenthrin preservative has been developed to improve the insect resistance of timber. As this preservative is applied by spray, it only penetrates the outer 2 mm of the timber cross-section. Concerns have been raised as to whether this thin-envelope system will provide protection against insects in the longer term, particularly when exposed to sunlight for extended periods.

=== Fire retardant treated ===
The fireproofing of wood utilizes a fire retardant chemical that remains stable in high temperature environments. The fire retardant is applied under pressure at a wood treating plant like the preservatives described above, or applied as a surface coating.

In both cases, treatment provides a physical barrier to flame spread. The treated wood chars but does not oxidize. Effectively this creates a convective layer that transfers flame heat to the wood in a uniform way which significantly slows the progress of fire to the material. There are several commercially available wood-based construction materials using pressure-treatment (such as those marketed in the United States and elsewhere under the trade names of 'FirePro', 'Burnblock' 'Wood-safe, 'Dricon', 'D-Blaze,' and 'Pyro-Guard'), as well as factory-applied coatings under the trade names of 'PinkWood' and 'NexGen'. Some site-applied coatings as well as brominated fire retardants have lost favor due to safety concerns as well as concerns surrounding the consistency of application. Specialized treatments also exist for wood used in weather-exposed applications.

The only impregnation-applied fire retardant commercially available in Australia is 'NexGen'. 'Guardian', which used calcium formate as a 'powerful wood modifying agent', was removed from sale in early 2010 for unspecified reasons.

=== Oil-borne ===
These include pentachlorophenol ("penta") and creosote. They emit a strong petrochemical odor and are generally not used in consumer products. Both of these pressure treatments routinely protect wood for 40 years in most applications.

==== Coal-tar creosote ====
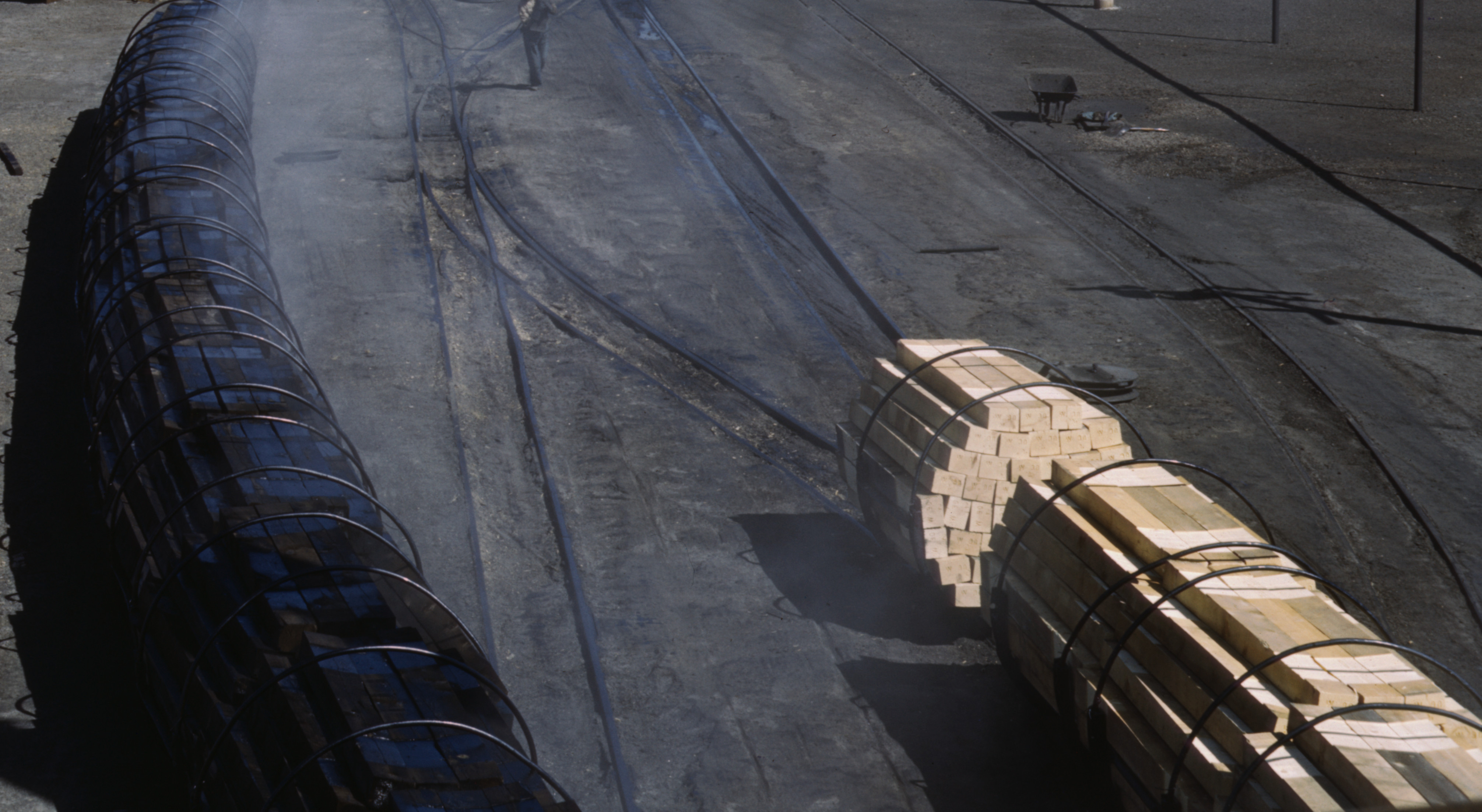
Wood railroad ties before (right) and after (left) infusion with creosote at a facility of the Santa Fe Railroad in Albuquerque, New Mexico, in March 1943

Creosote was the first wood preservative to gain industrial importance more than 150 years ago and it is still widely used today for protection of industrial timber components where long service life is essential. Creosote is a tar-based preservative that is commonly used for utility poles and railroad ties or sleepers. Creosote is one of the oldest wood preservatives, and was originally derived from a wood distillate, but now, virtually all creosote is manufactured from the distillation of coal tar. Creosote is regulated as a pesticide, and is not usually sold to the general public.

==== Linseed oil ====
In recent years in Australia and New Zealand, linseed oil has been incorporated in preservative formulations as a solvent and water repellent to "envelope treat" timber. This involves just treating the outer 5 mm of the cross-section of a timber member with preservative (e.g., permethrin 25:75), leaving the core untreated. While not as effective as CCA or LOSP methods, envelope treatments are significantly cheaper, as they use far less preservative. Major preservative manufacturers add a blue (or red) dye to envelope treatments. Blue colored timber is for use south of the Tropic of Capricorn and red for elsewhere. The colored dye also indicates that the timber is treated for resistance to termites/white ants. There is an ongoing promotional campaign in Australia for this type of treatment.

=== Other emulsions ===
==== Light organic solvent preservatives (LOSP) ====
This class of timber treatments use white spirit, or light oils such as kerosene, as the solvent carrier to deliver preservative compounds into timber. Synthetic pyrethroids are typically used as an insecticide, such as permethrin, bifenthrin or deltamethrin. In Australia and New Zealand, the most common formulations use permethrin as an insecticide, and propiconazole and tebuconazole as fungicides. While still using a chemical preservative, this formulation contains no heavy-metal compounds.

With the introduction of strict volatile organic compound (VOC) laws in the European Union, LOSPs have disadvantages due to the high cost and long process times associated with vapour-recovery systems. LOSPs have been emulsified into water-based solvents. While this does significantly reduce VOC emissions, the timber swells during treatment, removing many of the advantages of LOSP formulations.

=== Epoxy ===
Various epoxy resins usually thinned with a solvent like acetone or methyl ethyl ketone (MEK) can be used to both preserve and seal wood. The wood coatings market in general will exceed $12 billion by 2027.

=== New technologies ===
==== Biological modified timber ====
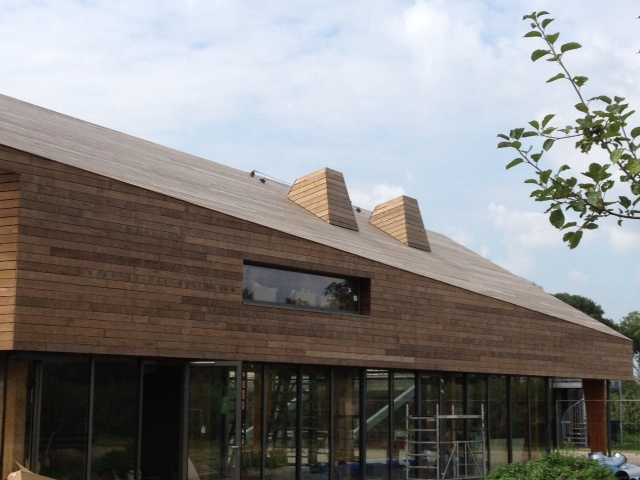
Paviljoen Eindhoven NobelWood

Biological modified timber is treated with biopolymers from agricultural waste. After drying and curing, the soft timber becomes durable and strong. With this process fast growing pinewood acquires properties similar to tropical hardwood. Production facilities for this process are in The Netherlands and is known under the trade name “NobelWood”.

From agricultural waste, like sugarcane bagasse, furfuryl alcohol is manufactured. Theoretically this alcohol can be from any fermented bio-mass waste and therefore can be called a green chemical. After condensation reactions pre-polymers are formed from furfuryl alcohol. Fast growing softwood is impregnated with the water-soluble bio-polymer. After impregnation the wood is dried and heated which initiates a polymerisation reaction between the bio-polymer and the wood cells. This process results in wood cells which are resistant to microorganisms. At the moment the only timber species which is being used for this process is Pinus radiata. This is the fastest growing tree species on Earth that has a porous structure which is particularly suitable for impregnation processes.

The technique is applied to timber mainly for the building industry as a cladding material. The technique is being further developed in order to reach similar physical and biological properties of other polyfurfuryl impregnated wood species. Besides the impregnation with the biopolymers the timber can also be impregnated with fire retardant resins. This combination creates a timber with durability class I and a fire safety certification of Euro class B.

==== Acetylation of wood ====
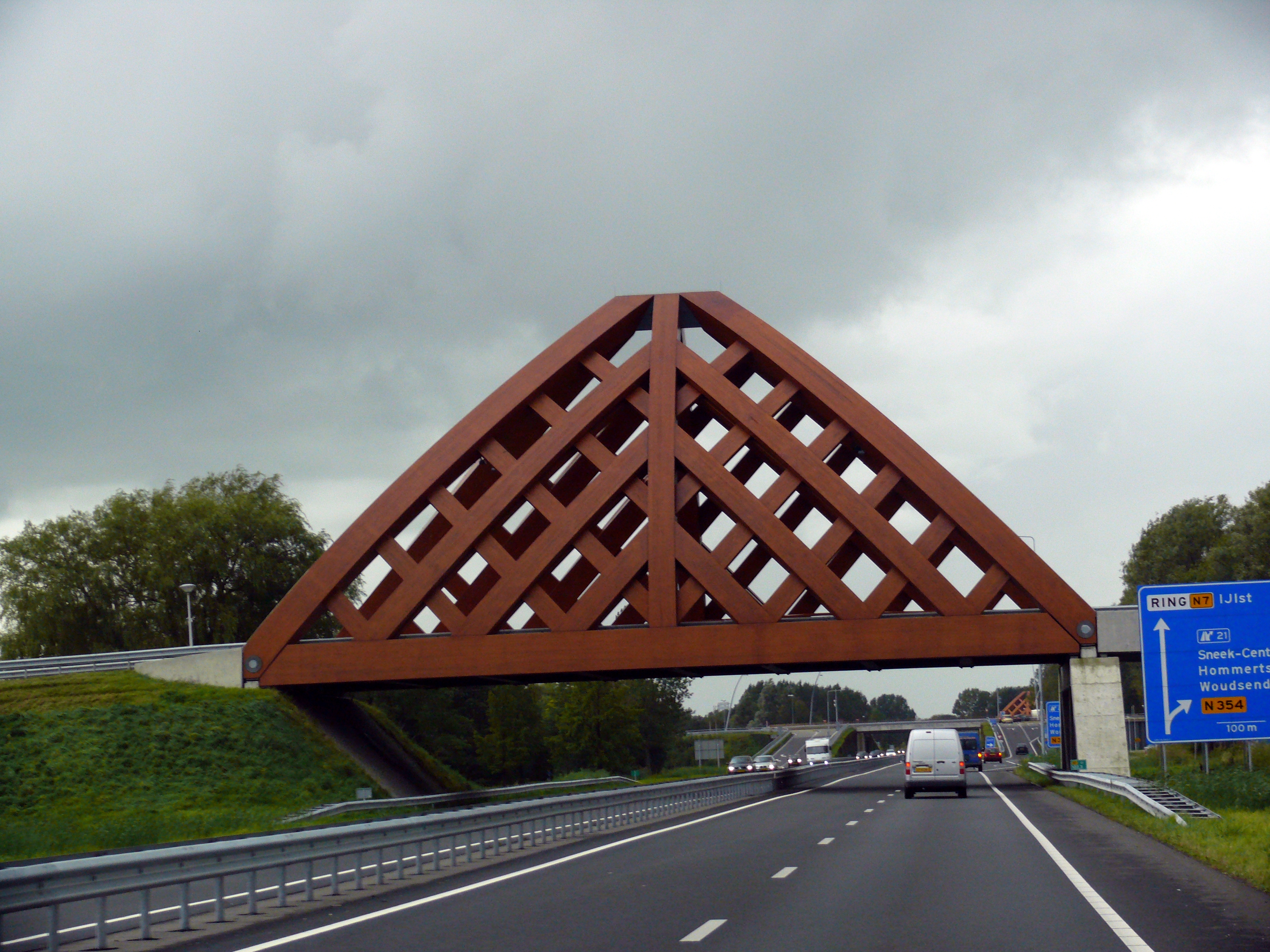
This bridge made from acetylated wood near Sneek, the Netherlands, is designed to carry heavy traffic.

Chemical modification of wood at the molecular level has been used to improve its performance properties. Many chemical reaction systems for the modification of wood, especially those using various types of anhydrides, have been published; however, the reaction of wood with acetic anhydride has been the most studied.

The physical properties of any material are determined by its chemical structure. Wood contains an abundance of chemical groups called free hydroxyls. Free hydroxyl groups readily absorb and release water according to changes in the climatic conditions to which they are exposed. This is the main reason why wood's dimensional stability is impacted by swelling and shrinking. It is also believed that the digestion of wood by enzymes initiates at the free hydroxyl sites, which is one of the principal reasons why wood is prone to decay.

Acetylation effectively changes the compounds with free hydroxyls within wood into acetate esters. This is done by reacting the wood with acetic anhydride, which comes from acetic acid. When free hydroxyl groups are transformed to acetoxy groups, the ability of the wood to absorb water is greatly reduced, rendering the wood more dimensionally stable and, because it is no longer digestible, extremely durable. In general, softwoods naturally have an acetyl content from 0.5 to 1.5% and more durable hardwoods from 2 to 4.5%. Acetylation takes wood well beyond these levels with corresponding benefits. These include an extended coatings life due to acetylated wood acting as a more stable substrate for paints and translucent coatings. acetylated wood is non-toxic and does not have the environmental issues associated with traditional preservation techniques.

The acetylation of wood was first done in Germany in 1928 by Fuchs. In 1946, Tarkow, Stamm and Erickson first described the use of wood acetylation to stabilize wood from swelling in water. Since the 1940s, many laboratories around the world have looked at acetylation of many different types of woods and agricultural resources.

In spite of the vast amount of research on chemical modification of wood, and, more specifically, on the acetylation of wood, commercialization did not come easily. The first patent on the acetylation of wood was filed by Suida in Austria in 1930. Later, in 1947, Stamm and Tarkow filed a patent on the acetylation of wood and boards using pyridine as a catalyst. In 1961, the Koppers Company published a technical bulletin on the acetylation of wood using no catalysis, but with an organic cosolvent In 1977, in Russia, Otlesnov and Nikitina came close to commercialization, but the process was discontinued, presumably because cost-effectiveness could not be achieved. In 2007, Titan Wood, a London-based company, with production facilities in The Netherlands, achieved cost-effective commercialization and began large-scale production of acetylated wood under the trade name "Accoya".

=== Natural ===
==== Copper plating ====
Copper plating or copper sheathing is the practice of covering wood, most commonly wooden hulls of ships, with copper metal. As metallic copper is both repellent and toxic to fungus, insects such as termites, and marine bi-valves this would preserve the wood and also act as an anti-fouling measure to prevent aquatic life from attaching to the ship's hull and reducing a ship's speed and maneuverability.

==== Naturally rot-resistant woods ====
These species are resistant to decay in their natural state, due to high levels of organic chemicals called extractives, mainly polyphenols, providing them antimicrobial properties. Extractives are chemicals that are deposited in the heartwood of certain tree species as they convert sapwood to heartwood; they are present in both parts though. Huon pine (Lagarostrobos franklinii), merbau (Intsia bijuga), ironbark (Eucalyptus spp.), totara (Podocarpus totara), puriri (Vitex lucens), kauri (Agathis australis), and many cypresses, such as coast redwood (Sequoia sempervirens) and western red cedar (Thuja plicata), fall in this category. However, many of these species tend to be prohibitively expensive for general construction applications.

Huon pine was used for ship hulls in the 19th century, but over-harvesting and Huon pine's extremely slow growth rate makes this now a specialty timber. Huon pine is so rot resistant that fallen trees from many years ago are still commercially valuable. Merbau is still a popular decking timber and has a long life in above ground applications, but it is logged in an unsustainable manner and is too hard and brittle for general use. Ironbark is a good choice where available. It is harvested from both old-growth and plantation in Australia and is highly resistant to rot and termites. It is most commonly used for fence posts and house stumps. Eastern red cedar (Juniperus virginiana) and black locust (Robinia pseudoacacia) have long been used for rot-resistant fence posts and rails in eastern United States, with the black locust also planted in modern times in Europe. Coast redwood is commonly used for similar applications in the western United States. Totara and puriri were used extensively in New Zealand during the European colonial era when native forests were "mined", even as fence posts of which many are still operating. Totara was used by the Māori to build large waka (canoes). Today, they are specialty timbers as a result of their scarcity, although lower grade stocks are sold for landscaping use. Kauri is a superb timber for building the hulls and decks of boats. It too is now a specialty timber and ancient logs (in excess of 3 000 years) that have been mined from swamps are used by wood turners and furniture makers.

The natural durability or rot and insect resistance of wood species is always based on the heartwood (or "truewood"). The sapwood of all timber species should be considered to be non-durable without preservative treatment.

==== Natural extractives ====
Natural substances, purified from naturally rot-resistant trees and responsible for natural durability, also known as natural extractives, are another promising wood preservatives. Several compounds have been described to be responsible for natural durability, including different polyphenols, lignins, lignans (such as gmelinol, plicatic acid), hinokitiol, α-cadinol and other sesquiterpenoids, flavonoids (such as mesquitol), and other substances. These compounds are mostly identified in the heartwood, although they are also present in minimal concentrations in the sapwood. Tannins, which have also shown to act as protectants, are present in the bark of trees. Treatment of timber with natural extractives, such as hinokitiol, tannins, and different tree extracts, has been studied and proposed to be another environmentally-friendly wood preservation method.

==== Tung oil ====
Tung oil has been used for hundreds of years in China, where it was used as a preservative for wood ships. The oil penetrates the wood, and then hardens to form an impermeable hydrophobic layer up to 5 mm into the wood. As a preservative it is effective for exterior work above and below ground, but the thin layer makes it less useful in practice. It is not available as a pressure treatment.

==== Heat treatments ====
By going beyond kiln drying wood, heat treatment may make timber more durable. By heating timber to a certain temperature, it may be possible to make the wood fibre less appetizing to insects.

Heat treatment can also improve the properties of the wood with respect to water, with lower equilibrium moisture, less moisture deformation, and weather resistance. It is weather-resistant enough to be used unprotected, in facades or in kitchen tables, where wetting is expected. However, heating can reduce the amount of volatile organic compounds, which generally have antimicrobial properties.

There are four similar heat treatments — Westwood, developed in the United States; Retiwood, developed in France; Thermowood, developed in Finland by VTT; and Platowood, developed in The Netherlands. These processes autoclave the treated wood, subjecting it to pressure and heat, along with nitrogen or water vapour to control drying in a staged treatment process ranging from 24 to 48 hours at temperatures of 180 °C to 230 °C depending on timber species. These processes increase the durability, dimensional stability and hardness of the treated wood by at least one class; however, the treated wood is darkened in colour, and there are changes in certain mechanical characteristics: Specifically, the modulus of elasticity is increased to 10%, and the modulus of rupture is diminished by 5% to 20%. Thus, the treated wood requires drilling for nailing to avoid splitting the wood. Certain of these processes cause less impact than others in their mechanical effects upon the treated wood. Wood treated with this process is often used for cladding or siding, flooring, furniture and windows.

For the control of pests that may be harbored in wood packaging material (i.e. crates and pallets), the ISPM 15 requires heat treatment of wood to 56 °C for 30 minutes to receive the HT stamp. This is typically required to ensure the killing of the pine wilt nematode and other kinds of wood pests that could be transported internationally.

==== Mud treatment ====
Wood and bamboo can be buried in mud to help protect them from insects and decay. This practice is used widely in Vietnam to build farm houses consisting of a wooden structural frame, a bamboo roof frame and bamboo with mud mixed with rice hay for the walls. While wood in contact with soil will generally decompose more quickly than wood not in contact with it, it is possible that the predominantly clay soils prevalent in Vietnam provide a degree of mechanical protection against insect attack, which compensates for the accelerated rate of decay.

Also, since wood is subject to bacterial decay only under specific temperature and moisture content ranges, submerging it in water-saturated mud can retard decay, by saturating the wood's internal cells beyond their moisture decay range.

== Application processes ==
=== Introduction and history ===
Probably the first attempts made to protect wood from decay and insect attack consisted of brushing or rubbing preservatives onto the surfaces of the treated wood. Through trial and error the most effective preservatives and application processes were slowly determined. In the Industrial Revolution, demands for such things as telegraph poles and railroad ties (UK: railway sleepers) helped to fuel an explosion of new techniques that emerged in the early 19th century. The sharpest rise in inventions took place between 1830 and 1840, when Bethell, Boucherie, Burnett and Kyan were making wood-preserving history. Since then, numerous processes have been introduced or existing processes improved. The goal of modern-day wood preservation is to ensure a deep, uniform penetration with reasonable cost, without endangering the environment. The most widespread application processes today are those using artificial pressure through which many woods are being effectively treated, but several species (such as spruce, Douglas-fir, larch, hemlock and fir) are very resistant to impregnation. With the use of incising, the treatment of these woods has been somewhat successful but with a higher cost and not always satisfactory results. One can divide the wood-preserving methods roughly into either non-pressure processes or pressure processes.

=== Non-pressure processes ===
There are numerous non-pressure processes of treating wood which vary primarily in their procedure. The most common of these treatments involve the application of the preservative by means of brushing or spraying, dipping, soaking, steeping or by means of hot and cold bath. There is also a variety of additional methods involving charring, applying preservatives in bored holes, diffusion processes and sap displacement.

==== Brush and spray treatments ====
Brushing preservatives is a long-practised method and often used in today's carpentry workshops. Technological developments mean it is also possible to spray preservative over the surface of the timber. Some of the liquid is drawn into the wood as the result of capillary action before the spray runs off or evaporates, but unless puddling occurs penetration is limited and may not be suitable for long-term weathering. By using the spray method, coal-tar creosote, oil-borne solutions and water-borne salts (to some extent) can also be applied. A thorough brush or spray treatment with coal-tar creosote can add 1 to 3 years to the lifespan of poles or posts. Two or more coats provide better protection than one, but the successive coats should not be applied until the prior coat has dried or soaked into the wood. The wood should be seasoned before treatment.

==== Dipping ====
Dipping consists of simply immersing the wood in a bath of creosote or other preservative for a few seconds or minutes. Similar penetrations to that of brushing and spraying processes are achieved. It has the advantage of minimizing hand labor. It requires more equipment and larger quantities of preservative and is not adequate for treating small lots of timber. Usually the dipping process is useful in the treatment of window sashes and doors. Except for copper naphthenate, treatment with copper salt preservative is no longer allowed with this method.

==== Steeping ====
In this process the wood is submerged in a tank of water-preservative mix, and allowed to soak for a longer period of time (several days to weeks). This process was developed in the 19th century by John Kyan. The depth and retention achieved depends on factors such as species, wood moisture, preservative and soak duration. The majority of the absorption takes place during the first two or three days, but will continue at a slower pace for an indefinite period. As a result, the longer the wood can be left in the solution, the better treatment it will receive. When treating seasoned timber, both the water and the preservative salt soak into the wood, making it necessary to season the wood a second time. Posts and poles can be treated directly on endangered areas, but should be treated at least 30 cm (0.98 ft) above the future ground level.

The depth obtained during regular steeping periods varies from 5 to 10 mm (0.20 to 0.39 in) up to 30 mm (1.2 in) by sap pine. Due to the low absorption, solution strength should be somewhat stronger than that in pressure processes, around 5% for seasoned timber and 10% for green timber (because the concentration slowly decreases as the chemicals diffuse into the wood). The solution strength should be controlled continually and, if necessary, be corrected with the salt additive. After the timber is removed from the treatment tank, the chemical will continue to spread within the wood if it has sufficient moisture content. The wood should be weighed down and piled so that the solution can reach all surfaces. (Sawed materials stickers should be placed between every board layer.) This process finds minimal use despite its former popularity in continental Europe and Great Britain.

==== Kyanizing ====
Named after John Howard Kyan, who patented this process in England in 1833, Kyanizing consists of steeping wood in a 0.67% mercuric chloride preservative solution. It is no longer used.

==== Gedrian's Bath ====
Patented by Charles A. Seely, this process achieves treatment by immersing seasoned wood in successive baths of hot and cold preservatives. During the hot baths, the air expands in the timbers. When the timbers are changed to the cold bath (the preservative can also be changed) a partial vacuum is created within the lumen of the cells, causing the preservative to be drawn into the wood. Some penetration occurs during the hot baths, but most of it takes place during the cold baths. This cycle is repeated with a significant time reduction compared to other steeping processes. Each bath may last 4 to 8 hours or in some cases longer. The temperature of the preservative in the hot bath should be between 60 to 110 °C (140 to 230 °F) and 30 to 40 °C (86 to 104 °F) in the cold bath (depending on preservative and tree species). The average penetration depths achieved with this process ranges from 30 to 50 mm (1.2 to 2.0 in). Both preservative oils and water-soluble salts can be used with this treatment. Due to the longer treatment periods, this method finds little use in the commercial wood preservation industry today.

==== Preservative precipitation ====
As explained in Uhlig's Corrosion Handbook, this process involves two or more chemical baths that undergo a reaction with the cells of the wood, and result in the precipitation of preservative into the wood cells. Two chemicals commonly employed in this process are copper ethanolamine, and sodium dimethyldithiocarbamate, which reacts to precipitate copper dimetyldithiocarbamate. The precipitated preservative is very resistant to leeching. Since its use in the mid-1990s, it has been discontinued in the United States of America, but it never saw commercialization in Canada.

=== Pressure processes ===
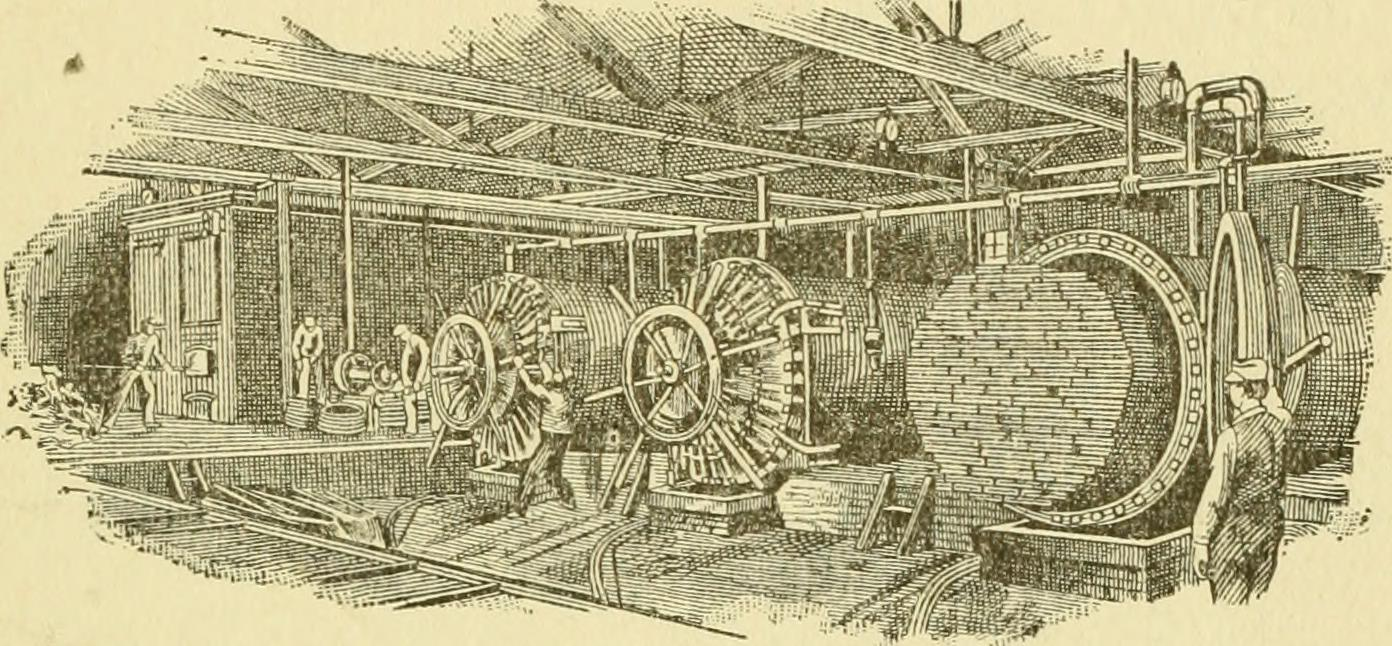
Late 19th century pressure treatment

Pressure processes are the most permanent method around today in preserving timber life. Pressure processes are those in which the treatment is carried out in closed cylinders with applied pressure or vacuum. These processes have a number of advantages over the non-pressure methods. In most cases, a deeper and more uniform penetration and a higher absorption of preservative is achieved. Further, the treating conditions can be controlled so that retention and penetration can be varied. These pressure processes can be adapted to large-scale production. The high initial costs for equipment and the energy costs are the biggest disadvantages. These treatment methods are used to protect ties, poles and structural timbers and find use throughout the world today. The various pressure processes that are used today differ in details, but the general method is in all cases the same. The treatment is carried out in cylinders. The timbers are loaded onto special tram cars, so called buggies or bogies, and into the cylinder. These cylinders are then set under pressure often with the addition of higher temperature. As final treatment, a vacuum is frequently used to extract excess preservatives. These cycles can be repeated to achieve better penetration.

Light organic solvent preservative (LOSP) treatments often use a vacuum impregnation process. This is possible because of the lower viscosity of the white-spirit carrier used.

==== Full-cell process ====
In the full-cell process, the intent is to keep as much of the liquid absorbed into the wood during the pressure period as possible, thus leaving the maximum concentration of preservatives in the treated area. Usually, water solutions of preservative salts are employed with this process, but it is also possible to impregnate wood with oil. The desired retention is achieved by changing the strength of the solution. William Burnett patented this development in 1838 of full-cell impregnation with water solutions. The patent covered the use of zinc chloride on water basis, also known as Burnettizing. A full-cell process with oil was patented in 1838 by John Bethell. His patent described the injection of tar and oils into wood by applying pressure in closed cylinders. This process is still used today with some improvements.

==== Fluctuation pressure process ====
Contrary to the static full-cell and empty-cell processes, the fluctuation process is a dynamic process. By this process the pressure inside the impregnation cylinder changes between pressure and vacuum within a few seconds. There have been inconsistent claims that through this process it is possible to reverse the pit closure by spruce. However, the best results that have been achieved with this process by spruce do not exceed a penetration deeper than 10 mm (0.39 in). Specialized equipment is necessary and therefore higher investment costs are incurred.

==== Boucherie process ====
Developed by Dr. Boucherie of France in 1838, this approach consisted of attaching a bag or container of preservative solution to a standing or a freshly cut tree with bark, branches, and leaves still attached, thereby injecting the liquid into the sap stream. Through transpiration of moisture from the leaves the preservative is drawn upward through the sapwood of the tree trunk.

The modified Boucherie process consists of placing freshly cut, unpeeled timbers onto declining skids, with the stump slightly elevated, then fastening watertight covering caps or boring a number of holes into the ends, and inserting a solution of copper sulfate or other waterborne preservative into the caps or holes from an elevated container. Preservative oils tend to not penetrate satisfactorily by this method. The hydrostatic pressure of the liquid forces the preservative lengthwise into and through the sapwood, thus pushing the sap out of the other end of the timber. After a few days, the sapwood is completely impregnated; unfortunately little or no penetration takes place in the heartwood. Only green wood can be treated in this manner. This process has found considerable usage to impregnate poles and also larger trees in Europe and North America, and has experienced a revival of usage to impregnate bamboo in countries such as Costa Rica, Bangladesh, India and the state of Hawaii.

==== High-pressure sap displacement system ====
Developed in the Philippines, this method (abbreviated HPSD) consists of a cylinder pressure cap made from a 3 mm thick mild steel plate secured with 8 sets of bolts, a 2-HP diesel engine, and a pressure regulator with 1.4–14 kg/m^{2} capacity. The cap is placed over the stump of a pole, tree or bamboo and the preservative is forced into the wood with pressure from the engine.

=== Incising ===
First tested and patented in 1911 and 1912, this process consists of making shallow, slit-like holes in the surfaces of material to be treated, so that deeper and more uniform penetration of preservative may be obtained. Incisions made in sawed material usually are parallel with the grain of the wood. This process is common in North America (since the 1950s), where Douglas-fir products and pole butts of various species are prepared before treatment. It is most useful for woods that are resistant to side penetration, but allow preservative transport along the grain. In the region in which it is produced, it is common practice to incise all sawed Douglas-fir 3 in (76 mm) or more in thickness before treatment.

Unfortunately, the impregnation of spruce, the most important structural timber in large areas in Europe, has shown that unsatisfactory treatment depths have been achieved with impregnation. The maximum penetration of 2 mm (0.079 in) is not sufficient to protect wood in weathered positions. The present-day incising machines consist essentially of four revolving drums fitted with teeth or needles or with lasers that burn the incisions into the wood. Preservatives can be spread along the grain up to 20 mm (0.79 in) in radial and up to 2 mm (0.079 in) in tangential and radial direction.

In North America, where smaller timber dimensions are common, incision depths of 4 to 6 mm (0.16 to 0.24 in) have become standard. In Europe, where larger dimensions are widespread, incision depths of 10 to 12 mm (0.39 to 0.47 in) are necessary. The incisions are visible and often considered to be wood error. Incisions by laser are significantly smaller than those of spokes or needles. The costs for each process type are approximately for spoke/conventional all-round incising €0.50/m^{2}, by laser incising €3.60/m^{2} and by needle incision €1.00/m^{2}. (Figures originate from the year 1998 and may vary from present day prices.)

The process of incising was heavily modernised by Walford Timber at its manufacturing site in Ross-On-Wye in the UK. The timber merchant has been trading since 1945 and developed an incising machine which was then adopted by the wider industry.

=== Microwaving ===
An alternative increases the permeability of timber using microwave technology. There is some concern that this method may adversely affect the structural performance of the material. Research in this area has been conducted by the Cooperative Research Centre at the University of Melbourne, Australia.

=== Charring ===
Charring of timber results in surfaces which are fire-resistant, insect-resistant and proof against weathering. Wood surfaces are ignited using a hand-held burner or moved slowly across a fire. The charred surface is then cleaned using a steel brush to remove loose bits and to expose the grain. Oil or varnish may be applied if required. Charring wood with a red-hot iron is a traditional method in Japan, where it is called yakisugi or shō sugi ban (literally 'fire cypress').

== See also ==
- Conservation and restoration of waterlogged wood
- Heavy metals
- Leaky homes crisis in New Zealand
- Nanotoxicology
- Impregnation resin
- Saw dust
- Yakisugi
