= Incipient wetness impregnation =

Technique for the synthesis of heterogeneous catalysts

Incipient wetness impregnation (IW or IWI), also called capillary impregnation or dry impregnation, is a commonly used technique for the synthesis of heterogeneous catalysts. Typically, the active metal precursor is dissolved in an aqueous or organic solution. Then the metal-containing solution is added to a catalyst support containing the same pore volume as the volume of the solution that was added. Capillary action draws the solution into the pores. Solution added in excess of the support pore volume causes the solution transport to change from a capillary action process to a diffusion process, which is much slower. The catalyst can then be dried and calcined to drive off the volatile components within the solution, depositing the metal on the catalyst surface. The maximum loading is limited by the solubility of the precursor in the solution. The concentration profile of the impregnated compound depends on the mass transfer conditions within the pores during impregnation and drying.
