= Wula Mountains =

Mountain range in Inner Mongolia, China

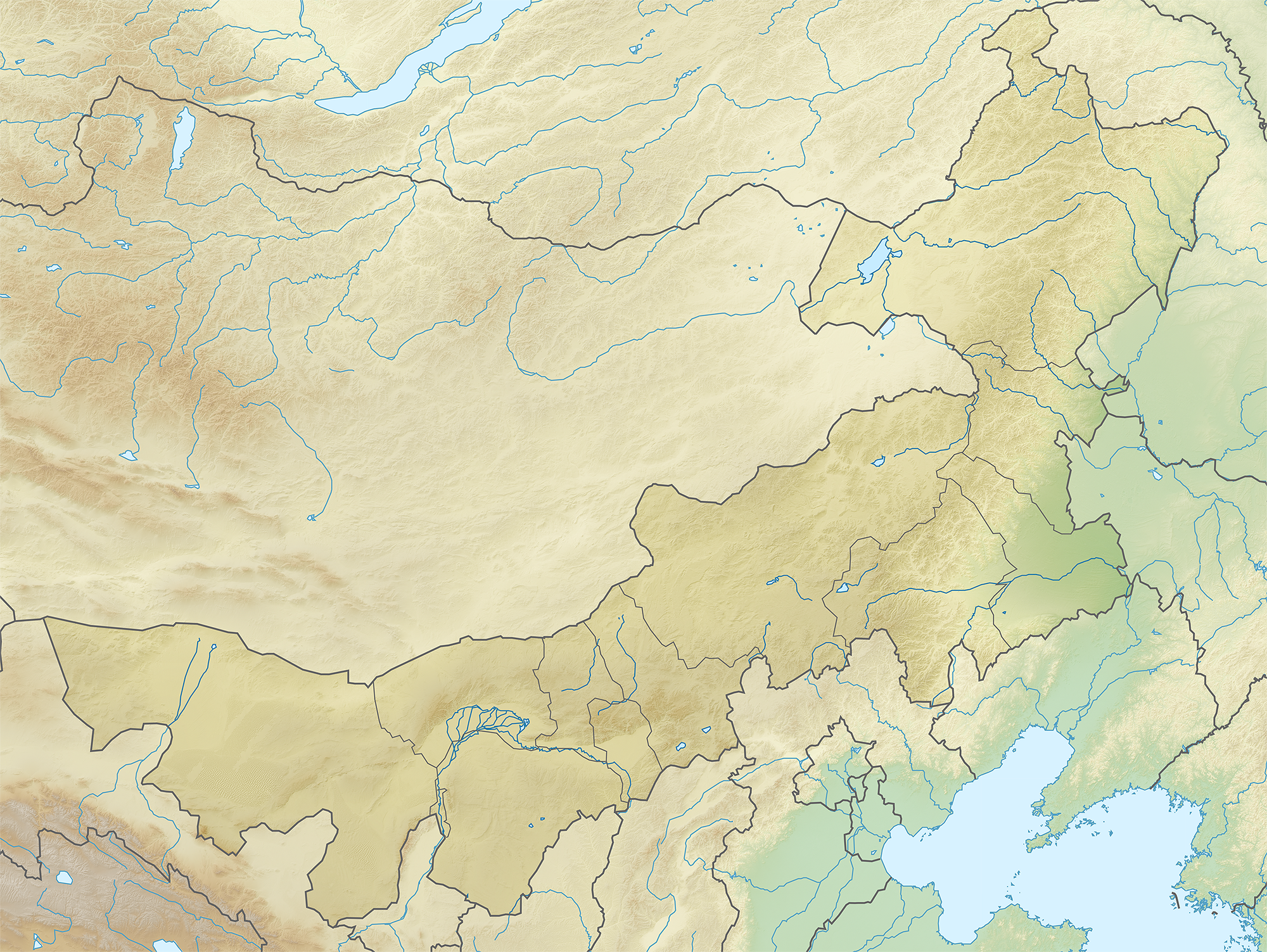
- Location within Inner Mongolia

Highest point
- Peak: Dahuabei (大桦背), Urad Front Banner
- Elevation: 2,324 m (7,625 ft)

Geography
- Location: Inner Mongolia, China
- Range coordinates: 40.72°N 109.25°E
- Parent range: Yin Mountains

The Wula Mountains (Note: Chinese: 乌拉山, Pinyin: Wu1la1shan1) are a subchain in the south of the Yin Mountains in Inner Mongolia, China. They are divided between Urad Front Banner of Bayan Nur and Baotou (parts of Hondlon and Jiuyuan districts).

Running roughly west-east, the mountain range is up to 20 km wide and about 90 km long, the eastern end is marked by the Hondlon River. It rises from elevations respectively about 1,100 and 1,200 metres on the southern and northern foot, Dahuabei (Note: Chinese: 大桦背, Pinyin: Da4hua4bei4, Location: 40.701,109.405) is the highest peak with an elevation of 2,332 metres.

== Geography ==
Located at the northern edge of the East Asian monsoon region, the Wula mountain range straddles between temperate continental climate and more unstable monsoon climate zones. It is therefore sensitive to global climate and environmental changes. Ecosystems are fragile and meteorological disasters occur frequently. The "Wuliangsuhai (Note: A freshwater lake northwest of the Wula mountains) Watershed Management Project" of China State Construction Engineering planted 1,296 hectares (3,200 acres) of forest on the northern and southern foothills to reduce surface runoff and prevent soil erosion.

On the northern slope, the soil consists mainly of loamy sandy soil and sandy loam soil.

The tree species Platycladus orientalis is very common. (Note: Other species might include Thuja sutchuenensis and Juniperus formosana.) About two thirds of the mountain range is covered by forest.

== History ==
After Qin Shi Huang unified China, he regarded the Wula mountains as the "Northern watchtower" (Note: Chinese: 北阙, Pinyin: bei3que4) of his empire, naming it the High Watchtower. (Note: Chinese: 高阙, Pinyin: Gao1que4) The name was used through the Qin and Han dynasties, the Hondlon ravine (Note: Harbouring the Hondlon river at the eastern end of the Wula range. Chinese: 昆都仑沟, Pinyin: Kun1du1lun2 gou1) was called High Watchtower valley. (Note: Chinese: 高阙谷, Pinyin: Gao1que4 gu3)

== Wula Mountain Forest Park ==
Wula Mountain Forest Park (Note: Chinese: 乌拉山国家森林公园, Pinyin: Wu1la1shan1 Guo2jia1 Sen1lin2 Gong1yuan2, literally: Wula Mountains National Forest Park) is a conservation area located within the Wula mountains west of Dahuabei and 6 km northeast of Baiyanhua Town, (Note: Chinese: 白彦花镇, Pinyin: Bai2yan4hua1 Zhen4) Urad Front Banner, at the border to Baotou. It was designated as a National Forest Park by the Ministry of Forestry in 1992. The main tree species found are Chinese red pine, Oriental arborvitae, East Asian white birch, Chinese Juniper, and cypresses. The tourist area can accommodate about 200 people for lodging and 400 for dining.

The park is accessible from the Baiyanhua exit on the G6 Beijing–Lhasa Expressway as well as via the China National Highway 110. An entry ticket costs RMB 30.
