= Five Sacred Trees of Kiso =

Five species of tree with cultural and religious significance in Japan

The Five Sacred Trees of Kiso (or Kiso Goboku) are five designated species of trees that hold cultural and religious significance in Japan. The trees that are part of the group include:

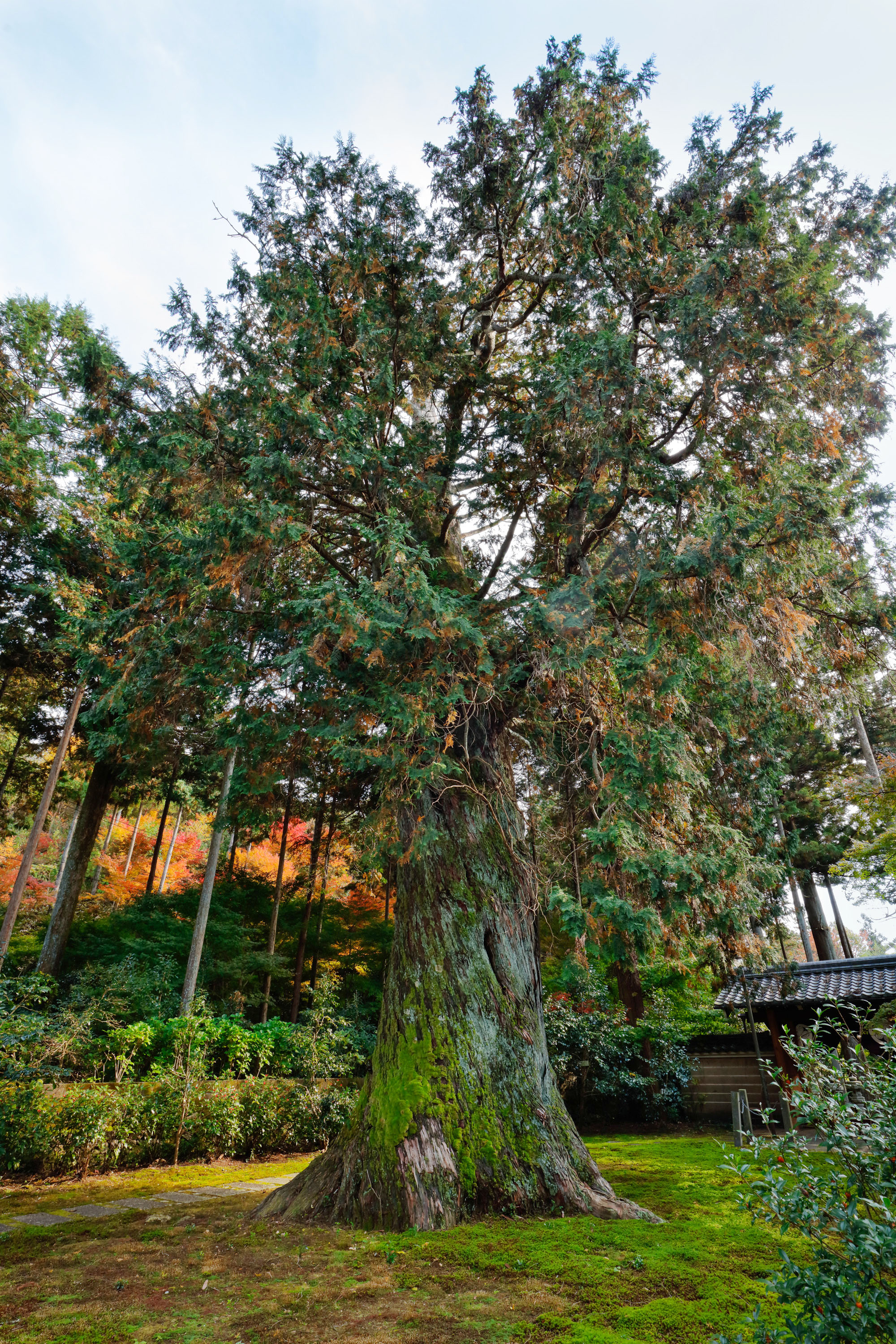
A Hinoki cypress

- Chamaecyparis obtusa (ヒノキ, the Japanese cypress, or the Hinoki cypress)
- Chamaecyparis pisifera (サワラ, the Sawara cypress, or Pea-bearing cypress)
- Sciadopitys verticillata (コウヤマキ, the kōyamaki or Japanese umbrella-pine)
- Thuja standishii (ネズコ, the Nezuko, Japanese thuja)
- Thujopsis dolabrata (アスナロ, the hiba or asunaro)

== History and protection ==
Found in the forests of the Kiso Valley, the trees have long held a significance in Japan. During the Feudal era in Japanese history, the five Kiso trees were protected from cutting by common people and their cutting was reserved only for the residences and temples of the elite. Kiso timber was favored for government buildings and mansions of the daimyo during the Edo period. Shinto shrines were built largely with the unfinished wood of the five trees.

The Tokugawa Shogunate sought to restrict the abuse of construction timber. The Tokugawa-affiliated Bishû clan was one of three to own the Kiso forests; they restricted felling the forest's trees to their clan in 1665. In 1708, this restriction was revised to include the Hinoki cypress, the Sawara cypress, the umbrella-pine, and the hiba. The Japanese thuja was added to this protected group in 1718. This protection did not prevent the forests from being ruined.

The punishment for cutting down a tree during the Edo period was decapitation. Restrictions on cutting the trees were lifted in the Meiji period. In modern times, the trees remain carefully protected.

The Japanese thuja continues to serve as an important timber tree in the country.

== See also ==
- Sacred tree
- Shinboku
