= Anna Wałek-Czernecka =

Polish botanist (1890–1978)

Anna Wałek-Czernecka (1890–1978) was a Polish botanist and professor at the University of Łódź noted for her studies of the genera Populus, Larix, and Thuja.
