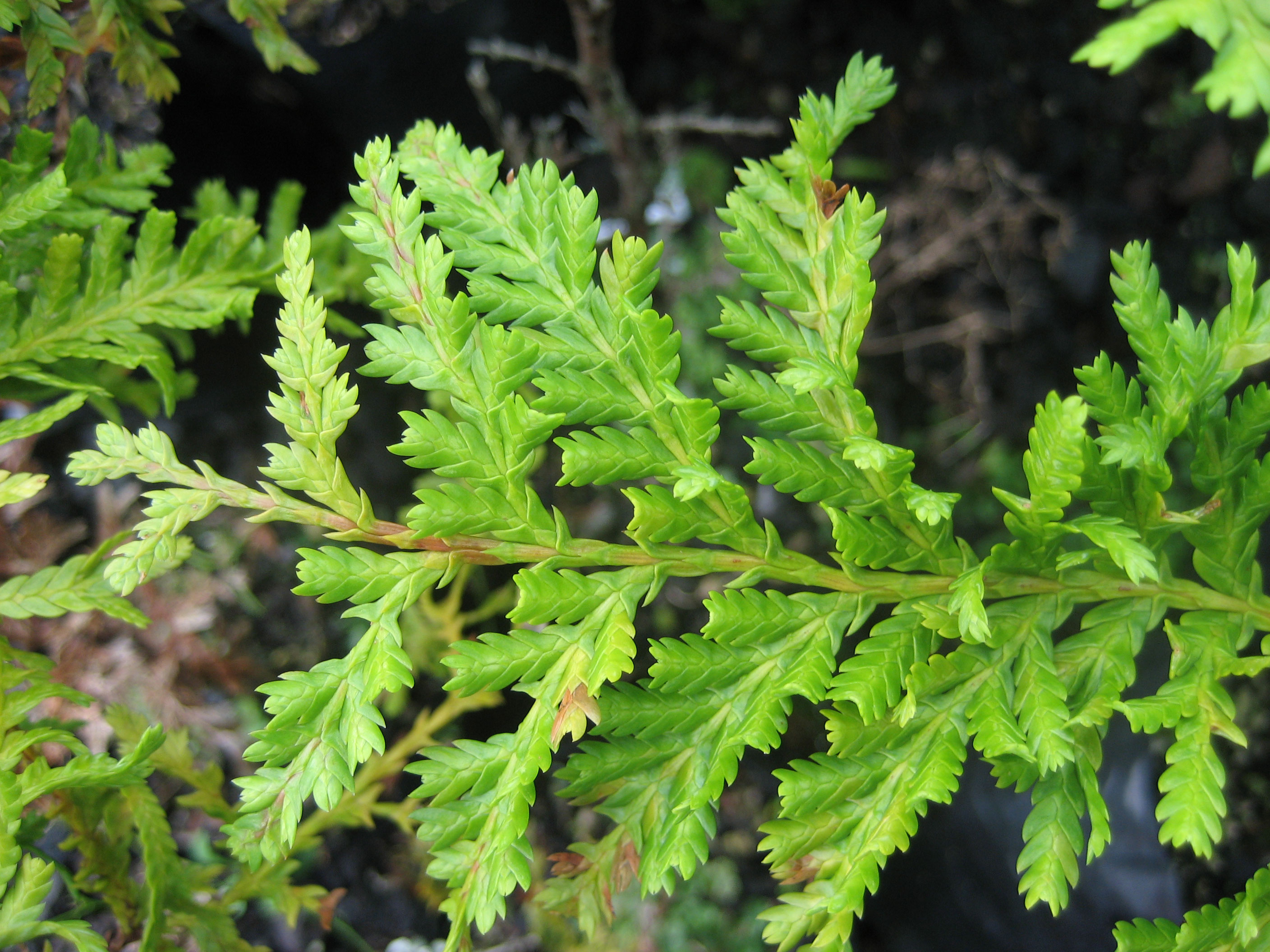
- Libocedrus plumosa, Kawaka, New Zealand

Scientific classification
- Kingdom: Plantae
- Clade: Tracheophytes
- Clade: Gymnospermae
- Division: Pinophyta
- Class: Pinopsida
- Order: Cupressales
- Family: Cupressaceae
- Subfamily: Callitroideae
- Genus: Libocedrus; Endl.

Type species
- Libocedrus doniana
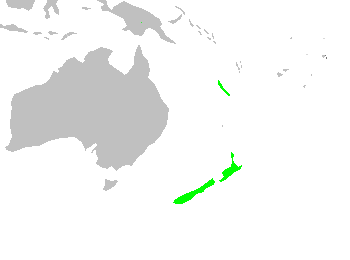
- Natural range of Libocedrus

Synonyms
- Stegocedrus Doweld

= Libocedrus =

Genus of conifers

Libocedrus is a genus of five species of coniferous trees in the cypress family Cupressaceae, native to New Zealand and New Caledonia. The genus is closely related to the South American genera Pilgerodendron and Austrocedrus, and the New Guinean genus Papuacedrus, both of which are included within Libocedrus by some botanists. These genera are rather similar to the Northern Hemisphere genera Calocedrus and Thuja: in earlier days, what is now Calocedrus was sometimes included in Libocedrus. They are much less closely related, as recently confirmed (Gadek et al. 2000). The generic name means "teardrop cedar", apparently referring to drops of resin.

The leaves are scale-like, 3–7 mm long, in apparent whorls of four (actually opposite decussate pairs, but not evenly spaced apart, instead with the successive pairs closely then distantly spaced). The cones are 8–20 mm long, and have just 2 pairs of moderately thin, erect scales, each scale with a distinct spine 3–7 mm long on the outer face, and bearing two winged seeds on the inner face.

== Species ==
The species recognized in the genus are:

Phylogeny of Libocedrus

- - L. bidwillii
  - - L. plumosa
    - - L. yateensis
      - - L. austrocaledonicus
        - L. chevalieri

| Image | Scientific name | Distribution |
|---|---|---|
| | Libocedrus austrocaledonica Brongn. & Gris | New Caledonia |
| | Libocedrus bidwillii Hook.f. | North + South Islands of New Zealand |
| | Libocedrus chevalieri J.Buchholz | Poindimié, Mt. Humboldt, + Mt. Kouakoué in New Caledonia |
| | Libocedrus plumosa (D.Don) Druce | North + South Islands of New Zealand |
| | Libocedrus yateensis Guillaumin | Povila, Bleue-Yaté river, + Ouinné river in New Caledonia |

The two New Zealand species, known individually by their Māori names kawaka (Libocedrus plumosa) and pāhautea (Libocedrus bidwillii), are sometimes called New Zealand cedars. No common names have been recorded for the three New Caledonian species.

== Uses ==
The wood of Libocedrus is soft, moderately decay-resistant, and with a spicy-resinous fragrance. The two New Zealand species are also grown as ornamental plants.
