= Nezuko =

Nezuko may refer to:

- Nezuko, a name for Thuja standishii, a species of conifer
- Nezuko Kamado, a character in the manga series Demon Slayer: Kimetsu no Yaiba
