= Libocedrus austrocaledonica =

Conservation status
- Near Threatened (IUCN 3.1)

Scientific classification
- Kingdom: Plantae
- Clade: Tracheophytes
- Clade: Gymnospermae
- Division: Pinophyta
- Class: Pinopsida
- Order: Cupressales
- Family: Cupressaceae
- Genus: Libocedrus
- Species: L. austrocaledonica

Binomial name
- Libocedrus austrocaledonica Brongn. & Gris

Species of conifer

Libocedrus austrocaledonica is a species of Libocedrus, endemic to New Caledonia, occurring mainly in the southern half of the island (also one site in the northern half), at 750–1,400 m altitude in montane cloud forest scrub.

It is an evergreen coniferous shrub (rarely a small tree) growing to 2–6 m tall, often multi-stemmed, with trunks up to 10 cm diameter. The foliage is arranged in strongly flattened sprays; the leaves are scale-like, arranged in opposite decussate pairs on the shoots; the facial leaves are 1–2 mm long and 1 mm broad, and the lateral leaves markedly larger, 3–7 mm long and 1.5–3 mm broad. The seed cones are cylindrical, 10–12 mm long, with four scales each with a prominent curved spine-like bract; they are arranged in two opposite decussate pairs around a small central columella; the outer pair of scales is small and sterile, the inner pair large, each bearing two winged seeds. They are mature about six to eight months after pollination. The pollen cones are 5–8 mm long.
