= Libocedrus yateensis =

Conservation status
- Endangered (IUCN 3.1)

Scientific classification
- Kingdom: Plantae
- Clade: Tracheophytes
- Clade: Gymnospermae
- Division: Pinophyta
- Class: Pinopsida
- Order: Cupressales
- Family: Cupressaceae
- Genus: Libocedrus
- Species: L. yateensis

Binomial name
- Libocedrus yateensis Guillaumin

Species of plant

Libocedrus yateensis is a species of Libocedrus, endemic to New Caledonia, occurring in a few small, isolated populations in low-elevation riverside sites at 150–600 m elevation in rainforest scrub. It is threatened by habitat loss.

It is an evergreen coniferous shrub or small tree growing to 12 m tall, sometimes multi-stemmed, with trunks up to 30 cm diameter. The foliage is arranged in flattened sprays; the leaves are scale-like, arranged in opposite decussate pairs on the shoots; the facial leaves are 1.5–2 mm long and 1 mm broad, and the lateral leaves slightly larger, 2–5 mm long and 1–2 mm broad. The seed cones are cylindrical, 9–10 mm long, with four scales each with a prominent curved spine-like bract; they are arranged in two opposite decussate pairs around a small central columella; the outer pair of scales is small and sterile, the inner pair large, each bearing two winged seeds. They are mature about six to eight months after pollination. The pollen cones are 5–8 mm long.
