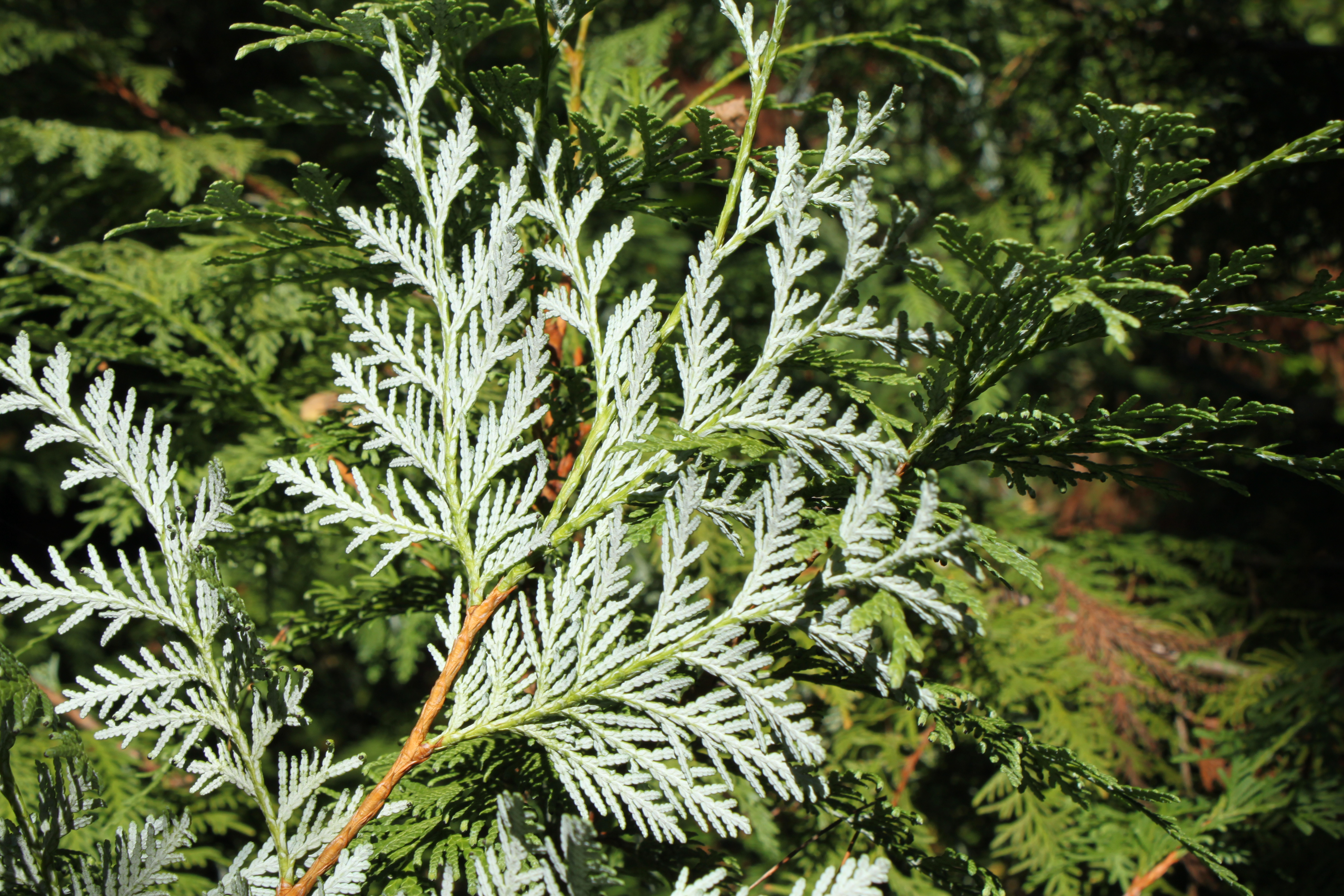

Conservation status
- Vulnerable (IUCN 3.1)

Scientific classification
- Kingdom: Plantae
- Clade: Tracheophytes
- Clade: Gymnosperms
- Division: Pinophyta
- Class: Pinopsida
- Order: Cupressales
- Family: Cupressaceae
- Genus: Thuja
- Species: T. koraiensis

Binomial name
- Thuja koraiensis Nakai

= Thuja koraiensis =

Species of conifer

Thuja koraiensis, the Korean arborvitae, is a species of conifer in the cypress family, Cupressaceae, native to Korea and the extreme northeast of China (Changbaishan). Its current status is poorly known; the small population in China is protected in the Changbaishan Nature Reserve, as is the small population in Soraksan Nature Reserve in northern South Korea, but most of the species' range in North Korea is unprotected and threatened by habitat loss.

It is a shrub or small tree growing to 3–10 m tall. The foliage forms flat sprays with scale-like leaves 2–4 mm long (up to 15 mm long on strong-growing shoots), matt dark green above, and with broad, vivid white stomatal wax bands below. The cones are oval, yellow-green ripening red-brown, 7–11 mm long and 4–5 mm broad (opening to 6–9 mm broad), with 8-12 overlapping scales.

It is occasionally grown as an ornamental tree for the contrast between the green upper and bright white lower sides of the foliage, though planting is limited by the low availability of seeds.
