= Libocedrus chevalieri =

Conservation status
- Vulnerable (IUCN 3.1)

Scientific classification
- Kingdom: Plantae
- Clade: Tracheophytes
- Clade: Gymnosperms
- Division: Pinophyta
- Class: Pinopsida
- Order: Cupressales
- Family: Cupressaceae
- Genus: Libocedrus
- Species: L. chevalieri

Binomial name
- Libocedrus chevalieri J.Buchholz

Species of conifer

Libocedrus chevalieri is a species of conifer in the cypress family, Cupressaceae. It is endemic to New Caledonia, occurring in three small, isolated populations on low mountain summits at 650–1,620 m elevation in cloud forest scrub on serpentine soils. It is threatened by habitat loss.

It is a coniferous shrub (rarely a small tree) growing to 5 m tall, often multi-stemmed, with trunks up to 10 cm diameter. The foliage is arranged in flattened sprays; the leaves are scale-like, 2.5–5 mm long and 2–2.5 mm broad, arranged in opposite decussate pairs on the shoots. The seed cones are cylindrical, 12–16 mm long, with four scales each with a prominent curved spine-like bract; they are arranged in two opposite decussate pairs around a small central columella; the outer pair of scales is small and sterile, the inner pair large, each bearing two winged seeds. They are mature about six to eight months after pollination. The pollen cones are 8–10 mm long.
