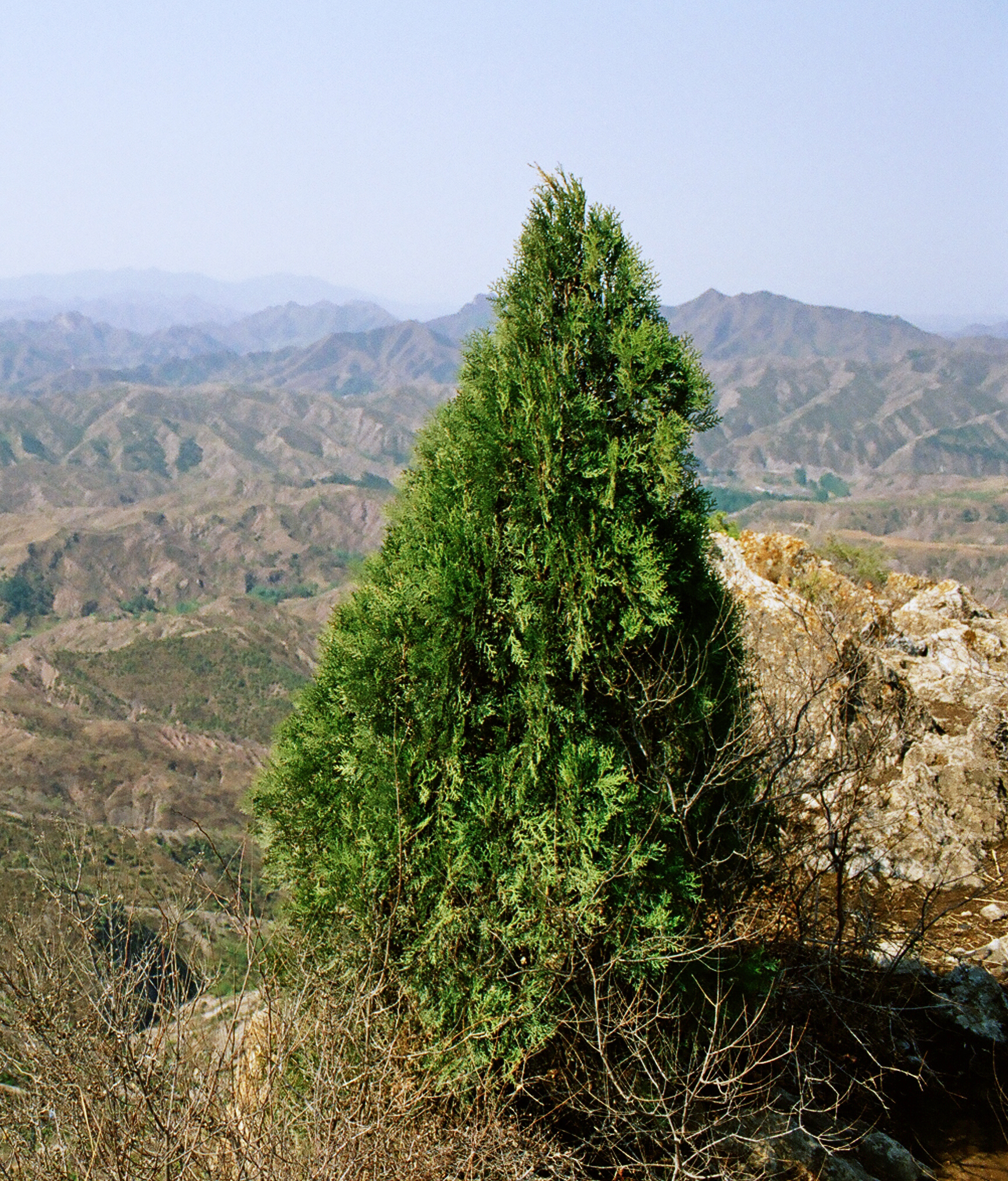
- Platycladus orientalis in its natural habitat in Simatai, Great Wall of China

Conservation status
- Near Threatened (IUCN 3.1)

- Secure (NatureServe)

Scientific classification
- Kingdom: Plantae
- Clade: Tracheophytes
- Clade: Gymnosperms
- Division: Pinophyta
- Class: Pinopsida
- Order: Cupressales
- Family: Cupressaceae
- Subfamily: Cupressoideae
- Genus: Platycladus; Spach
- Species: P. orientalis

Binomial name
- Platycladus orientalis (L.) Franco

Synonyms
- Biota (D.Don) Endl., illegitimate superfluous name; Thuja orientalis L.; Biota orientalis (L.) Endl.; and dozens more in Cupressus, Thuja, Platycladus, Biota, Chamaecyparis, Juniperus, Retinispora, Widdringtonia

= Platycladus =

Chinese arborvitae

Genus of conifers

Platycladus is a monotypic genus of coniferous trees in the cypress family Cupressaceae, containing only one species, Platycladus orientalis, the Chinese thuja, Oriental arborvitae, Chinese arborvitae, biota or Oriental thuja. It is native to northeastern parts of East Asia and North Asia, but is also now naturalised as an introduced species in other regions of the Asian continent.

== Description ==
A monoecious tree, it is small, slow-growing, reaching 15–20 m (49–66 ft) and 3–5 m (9.8–16.4 ft) trunk diameter. The foliage forms in flat sprays with scale-like leaves 2–4 mm (0.08–0.16 in) long, which are bright green in colour but may turn brownish, yellow-green, or coppery orange in winter. The cones are 1.5–2.5 cm (5/8–1 in) long, are pale blue-green when young, then ripen to brown in about eight months from pollination, and have 6–12 thick scales arranged in opposite pairs. The seeds are 4–6 mm (0.16–0.24 in) long, with no wing.

The branches are relatively short, loosely arranged and, usually, sharply directed upwards, and the bark, brownish, is detached in narrow vertical strips. The twigs are compressed and are arranged in vertical planes. The leaves, arranged in four rows, fleshy, opposite, decussate, truncated, imbricated as adults, somewhat curved inwards, of uniform green color and with a resiniferous gland on the underside. The female cones, of pink-salmon color and later bluish-greenish when immature, centimetric and of annual maturation, are oval with 6-8 flattened, thick scales, coriaceous and provided with an apical hook.

== Taxonomy ==
Although generally accepted as the only member of its genus, it has been suggested that the closely related species Microbiota decussata could be included in Platycladus, but this is not widely followed. Other fairly close relatives are Juniperus and Cupressus, both of these genera being graft-compatible with Platycladus. In older texts, Platycladus was often included in Thuja, which is reflected in one of its common names, "oriental thuja". But it is only distantly related to the genus Thuja. Differences include its distinct cones, wingless seeds, and its almost scentless foliage.

== Etymology ==
The binomial Platycladus means 'with broad or flattened shoots' deriving from Greek πλατύς platys 'broad, flat, level' and κλάδος klados 'branch, shoot of a tree'. The qualifier orientalis refers to its native habitat in China.

== Distribution ==
It is native to northwestern China, but it is difficult to distinguish the areas where they are native safely from those where they have been introduced. It is distributed in Manchuria, Russian Far East (Amur and Khabarovsk), and now it is naturalised in Korea, Japan, India, Florida and Iran as well. It is also cultivated in many parts of the world in parks, gardens, home yards, cemeteries and for hedges.

== Uses ==
Resistant to drought, it is very often used as an ornamental tree, both in its homeland, where it is associated with long life and vitality, and very widely elsewhere in temperate climates. It is suitable for form cuts and year-round opaque hedges, but also forms impressive slender solitary trees. It is also cultivated in tropical to subtropical areas due to its quality to adapt in hot climates albeit not bearing cones due to the lack of winter dormancy temperatures. Several cultivars have been selected, of which 'Aurea Nana' has gained the Royal Horticultural Society's Award of Garden Merit.

The wood is used in Buddhist temples both for (lavairos) construction work, and chipped, for incense burning. Its twigs and leaves contain 0.12% essential oil containing pinene and probably caryophyllene. Its use as a memorial tree dates back to the Zhou dynasty in China, where it was the official memorial tree of princes.

== Gallery ==
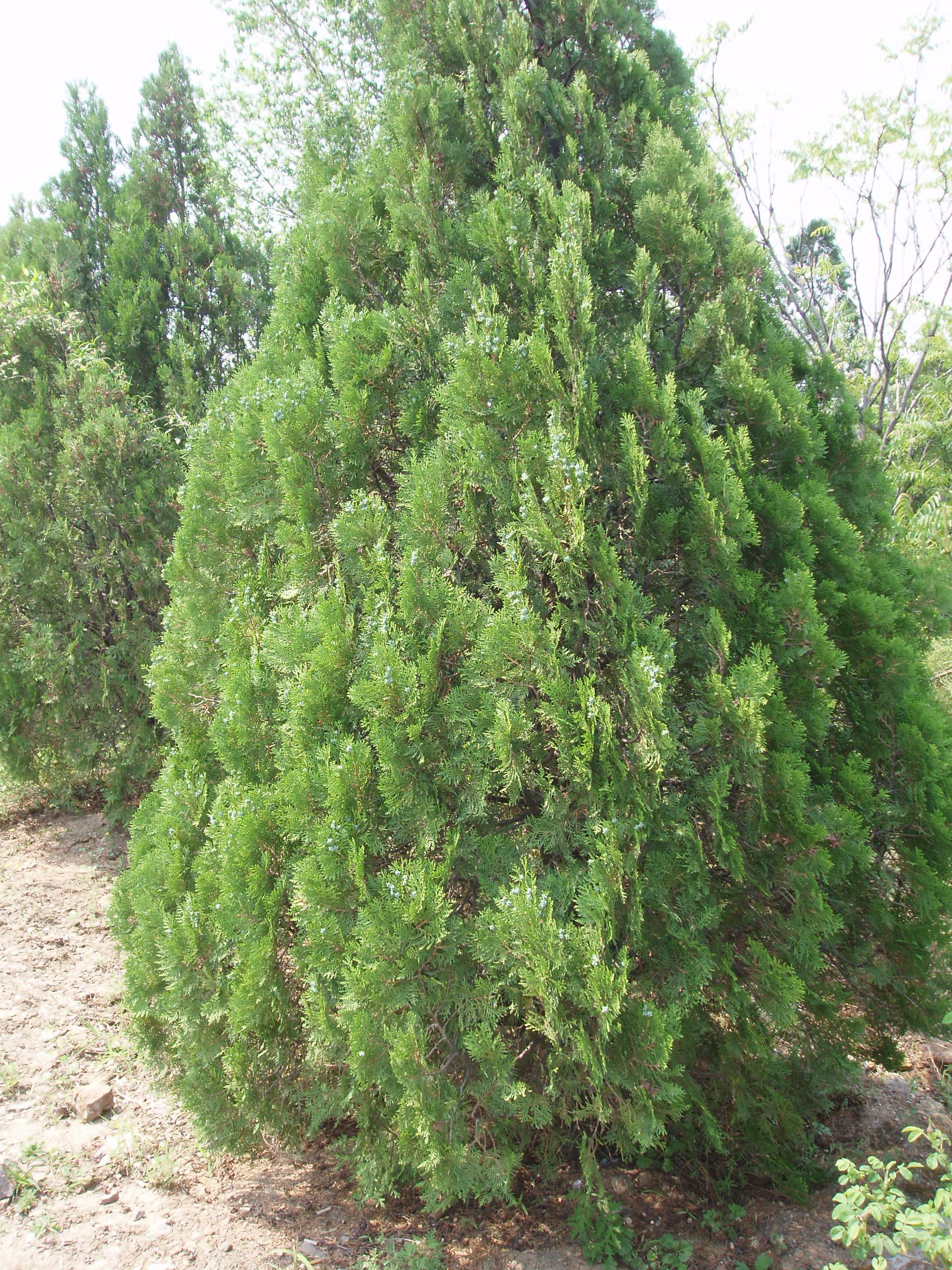
Habit of young plant

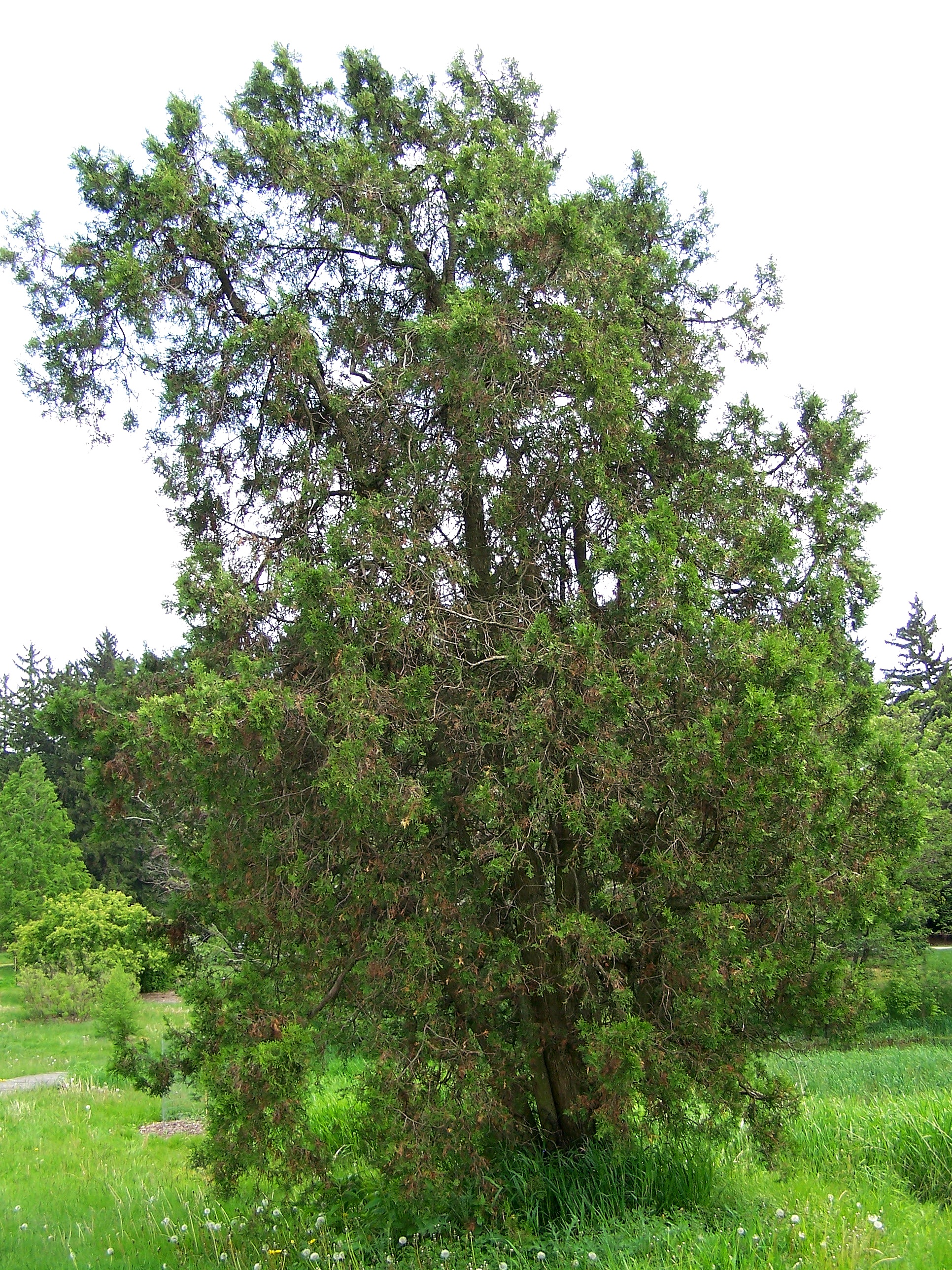
Platycladus orientalis, Morton Arboretum acc. 168-53#3

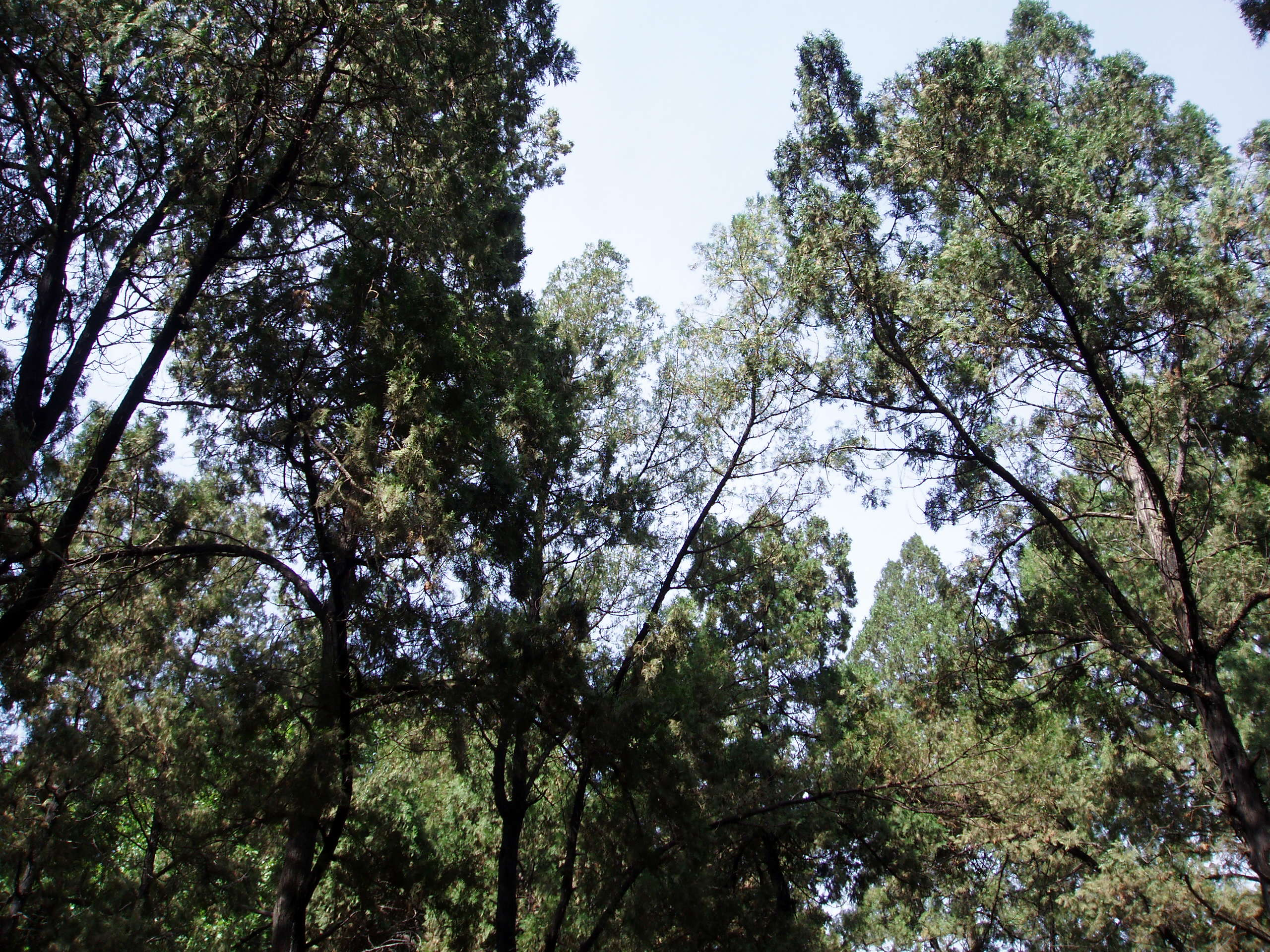
Mature trees

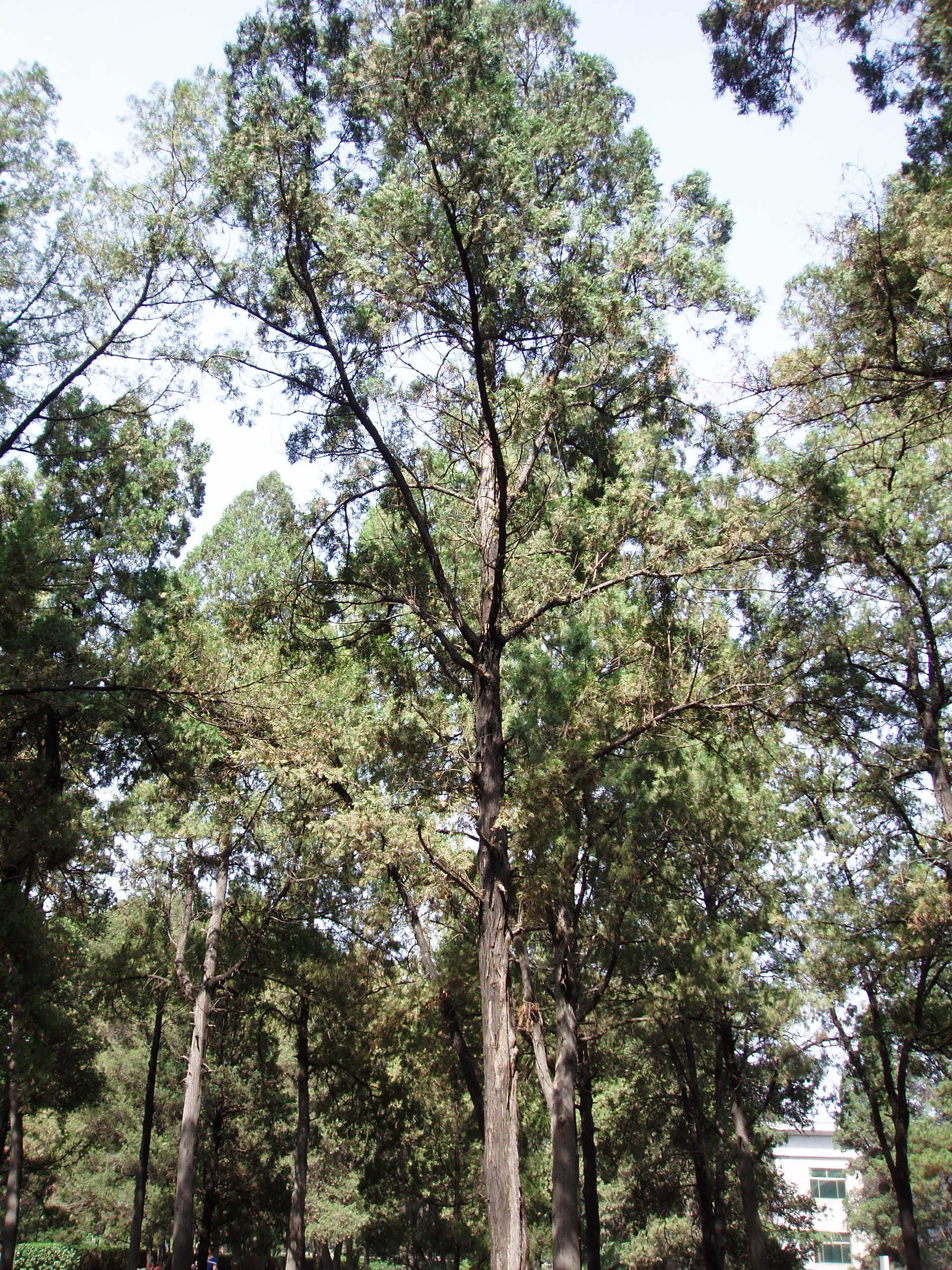
Mature tree

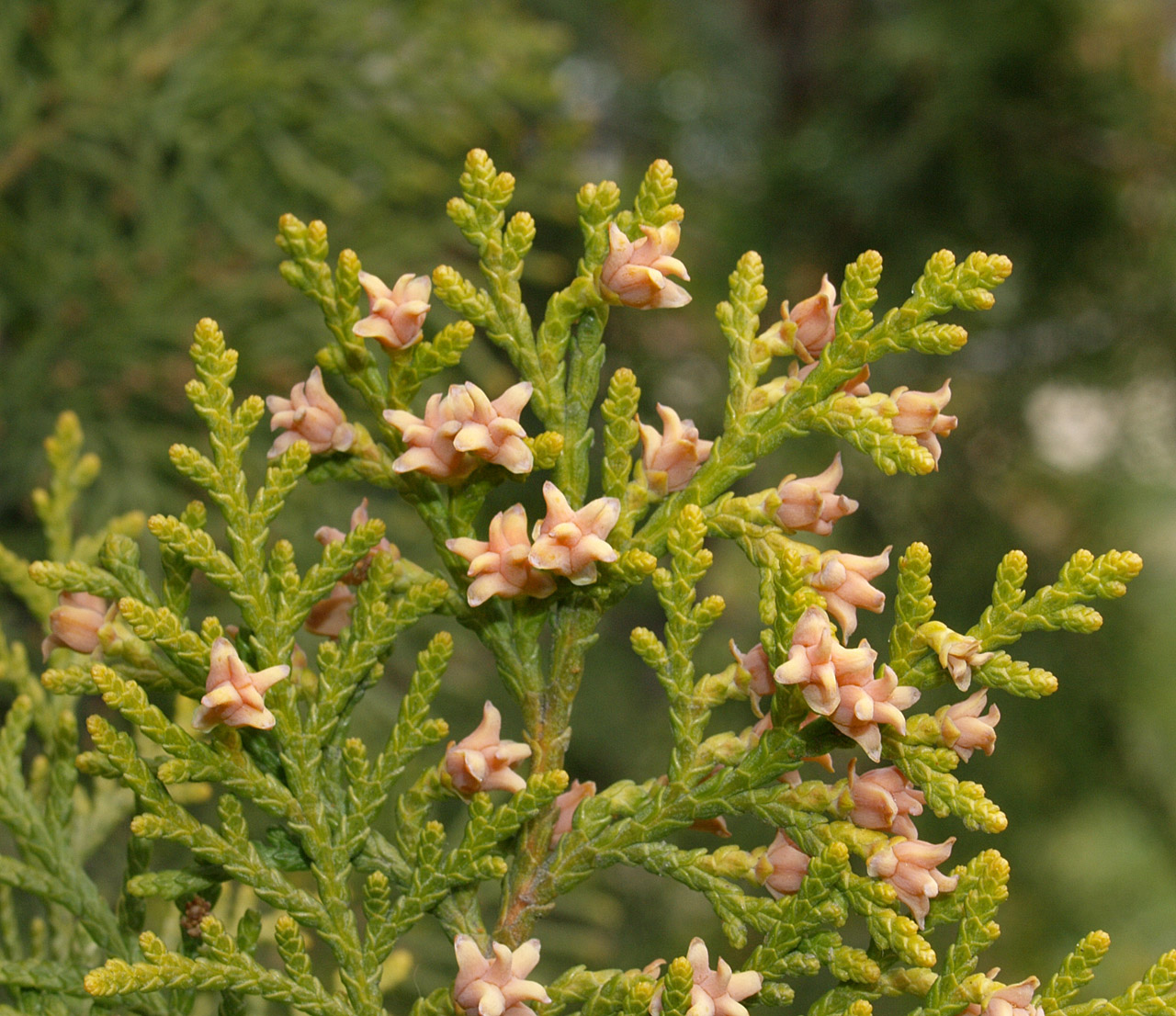
Very young female cones

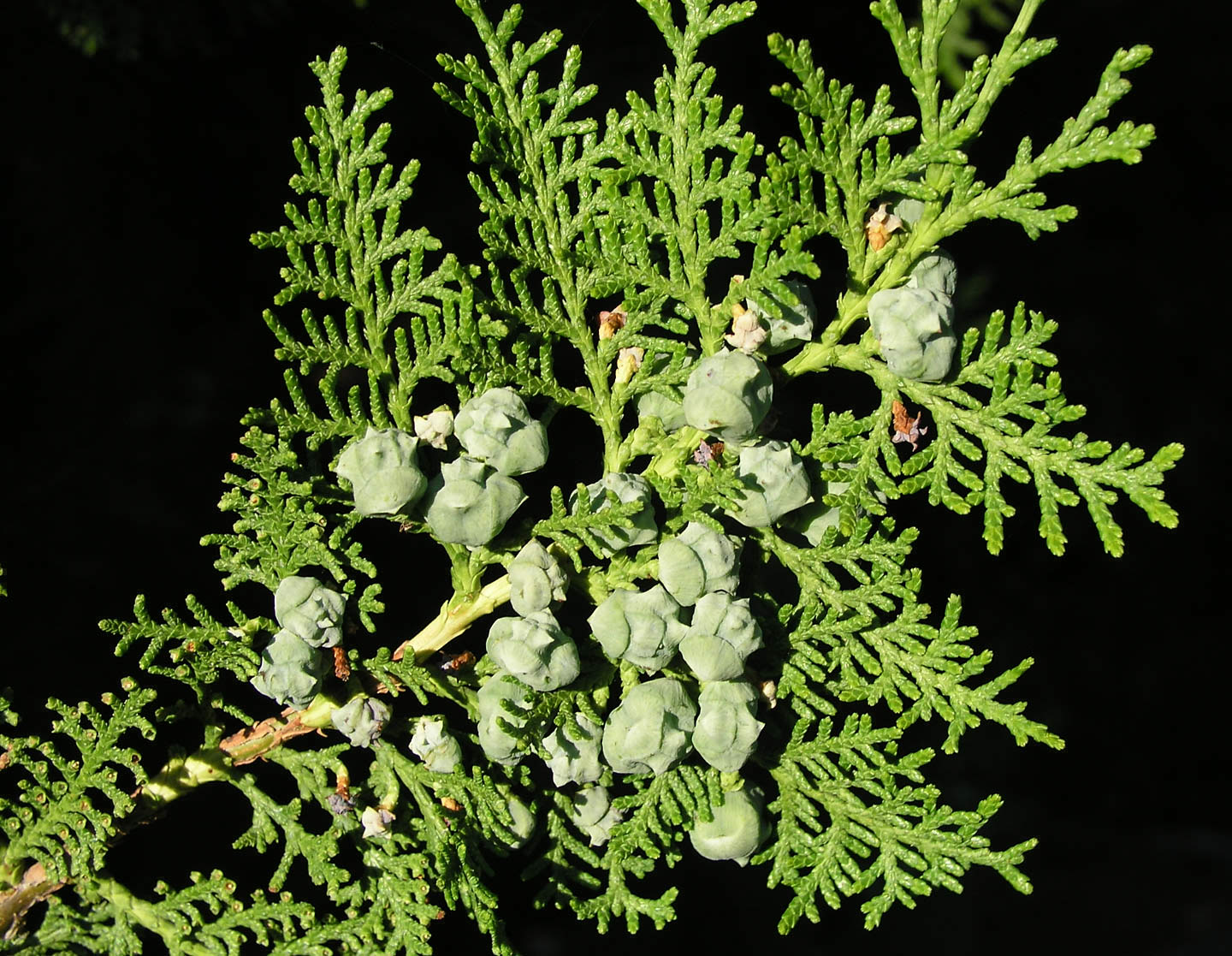
Immature seed cones

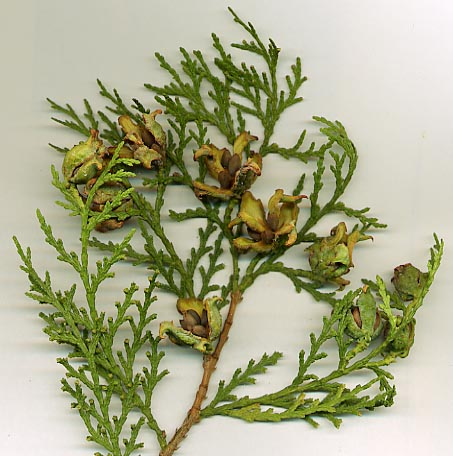
Mature cones, with seeds visible

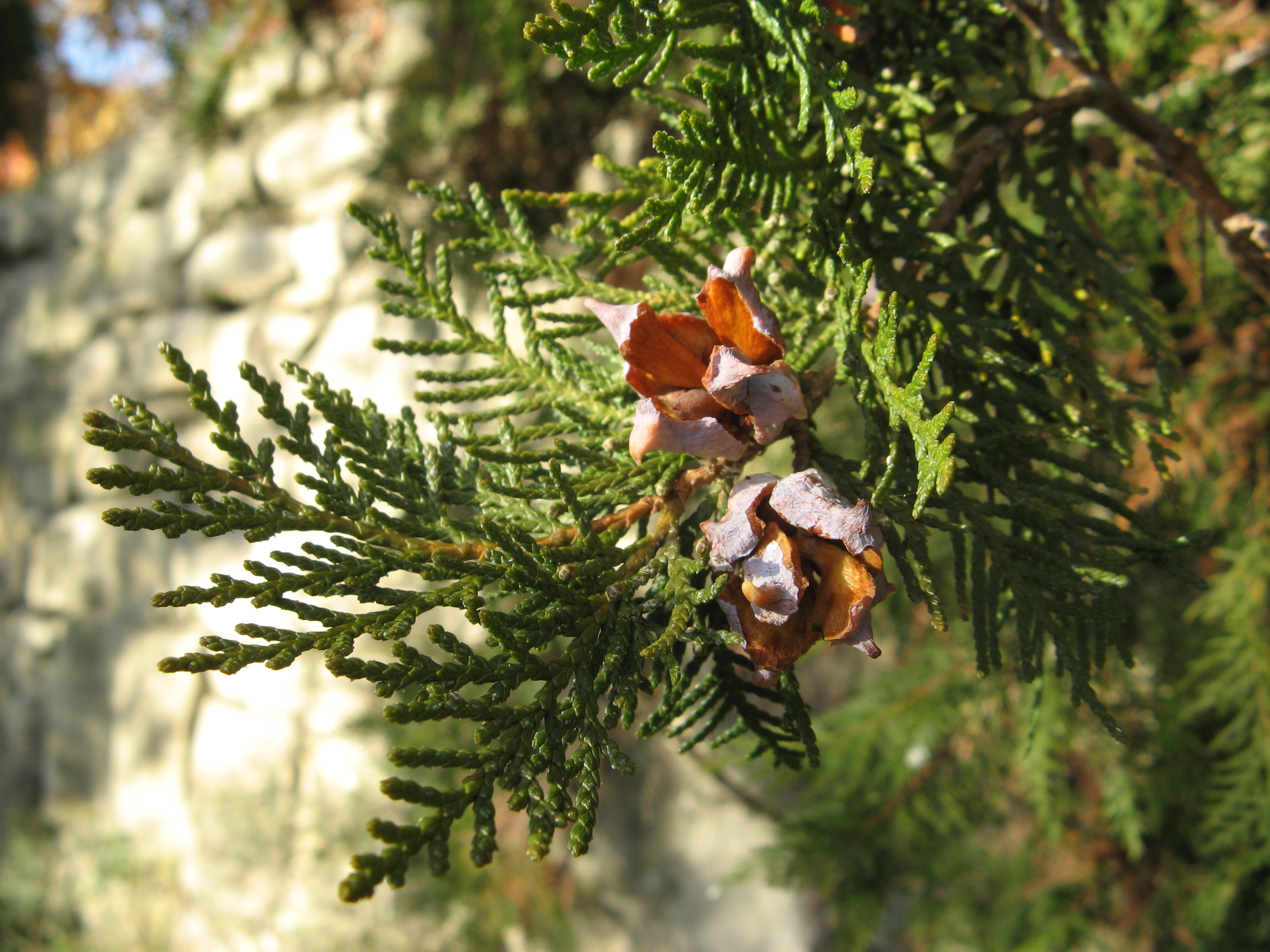
Mature cones

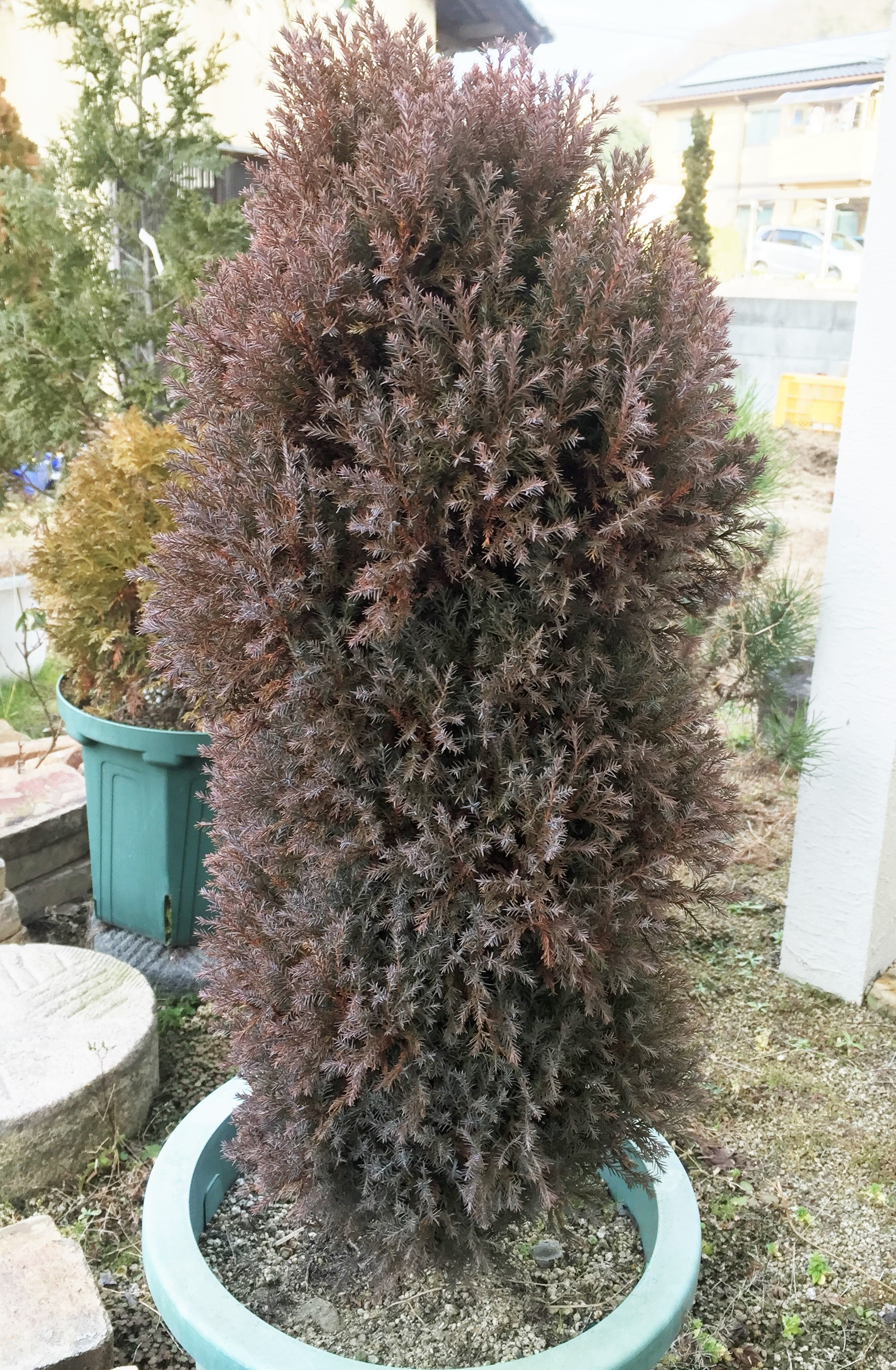
P. orientalis 'Rosedalis'

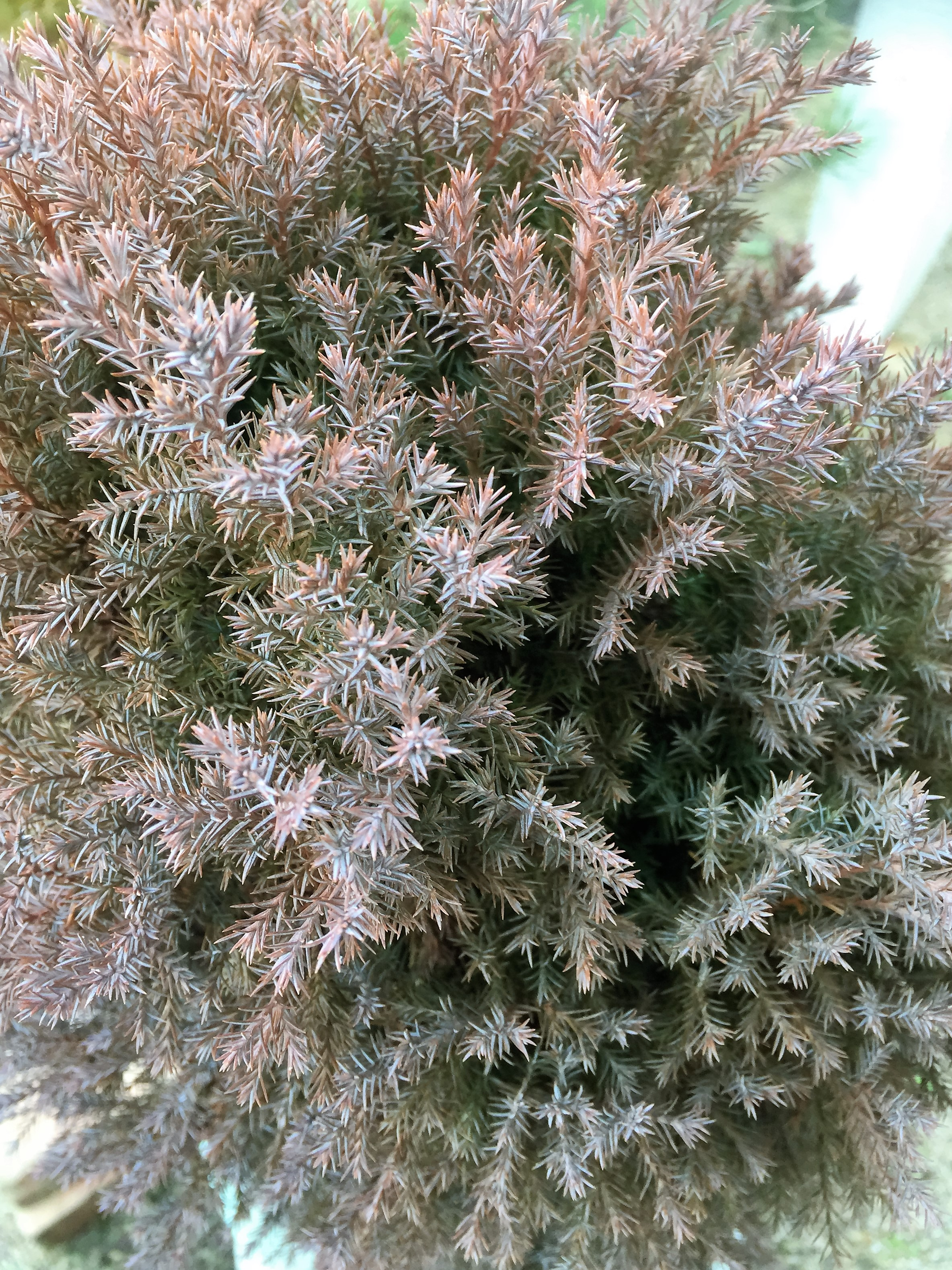
P. orientalis 'Rosedalis' leaf

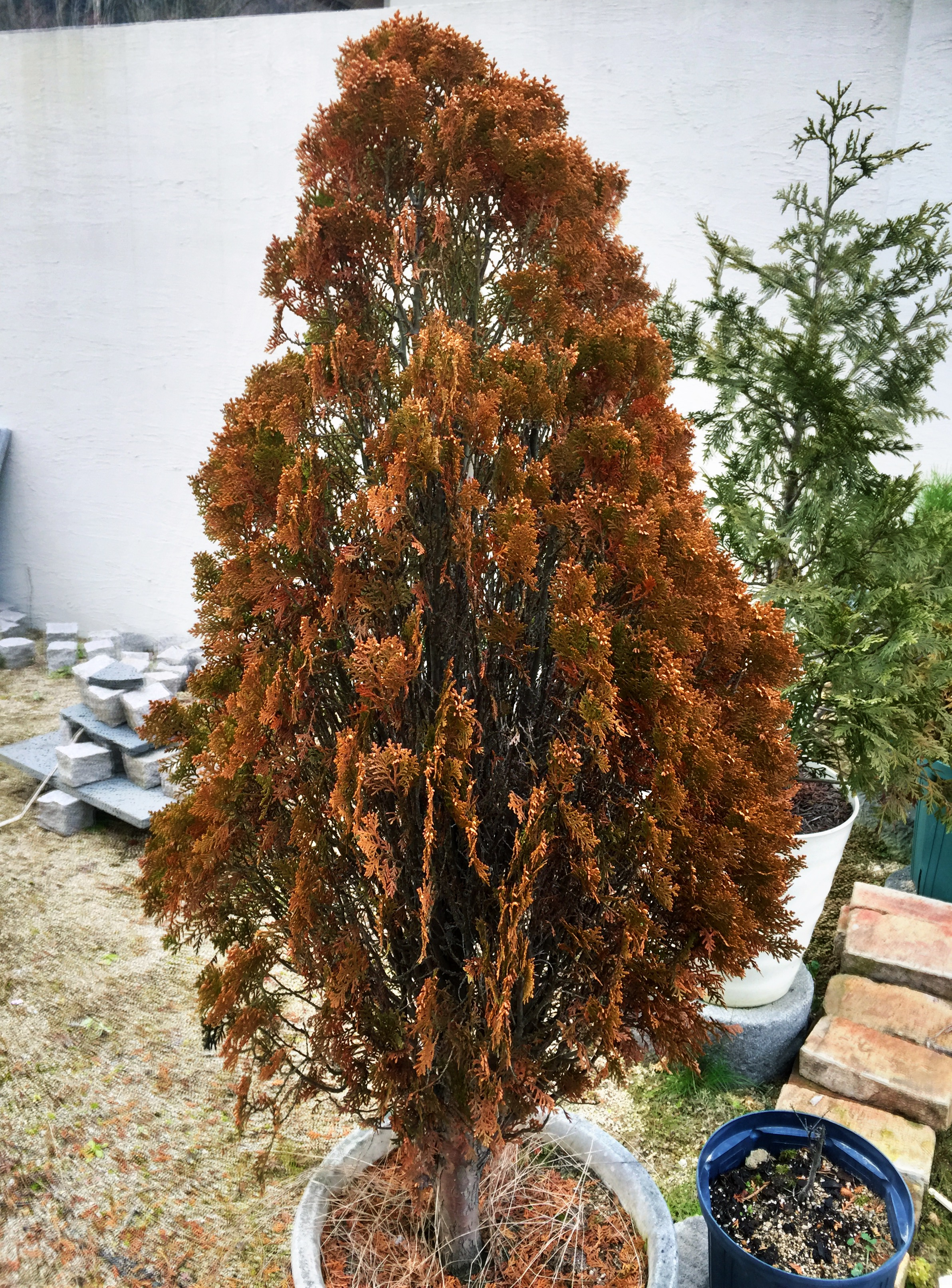
P. orientalis 'Semperaurea' in winter
