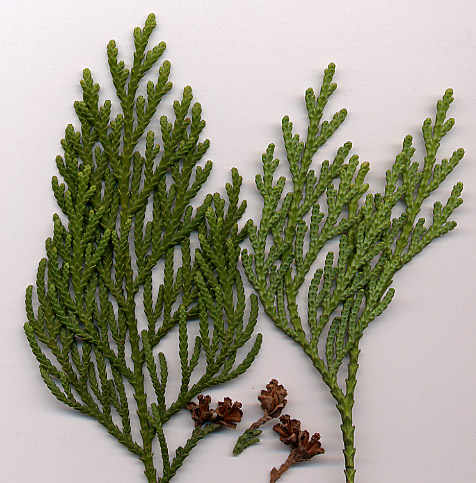
- Thuja standishii foliage and cones upper side left, under side right

Conservation status
- Near Threatened (IUCN 3.1)

Scientific classification
- Kingdom: Plantae
- Clade: Tracheophytes
- Clade: Gymnosperms
- Division: Pinophyta
- Class: Pinopsida
- Order: Cupressales
- Family: Cupressaceae
- Genus: Thuja
- Species: T. standishii

Binomial name
- Thuja standishii (Gordon) Carr.

= Thuja standishii =

Species of conifer

Thuja standishii (Japanese thuja; Japanese: nezuko, kurobe) is a species of coniferous tree in the cypress family, Cupressaceae. It is native to southern Japan, where it occurs on the islands of Honshū and Shikoku. It is a medium-sized tree, reaching 20–35 m tall and with a trunk up to 1 m diameter.

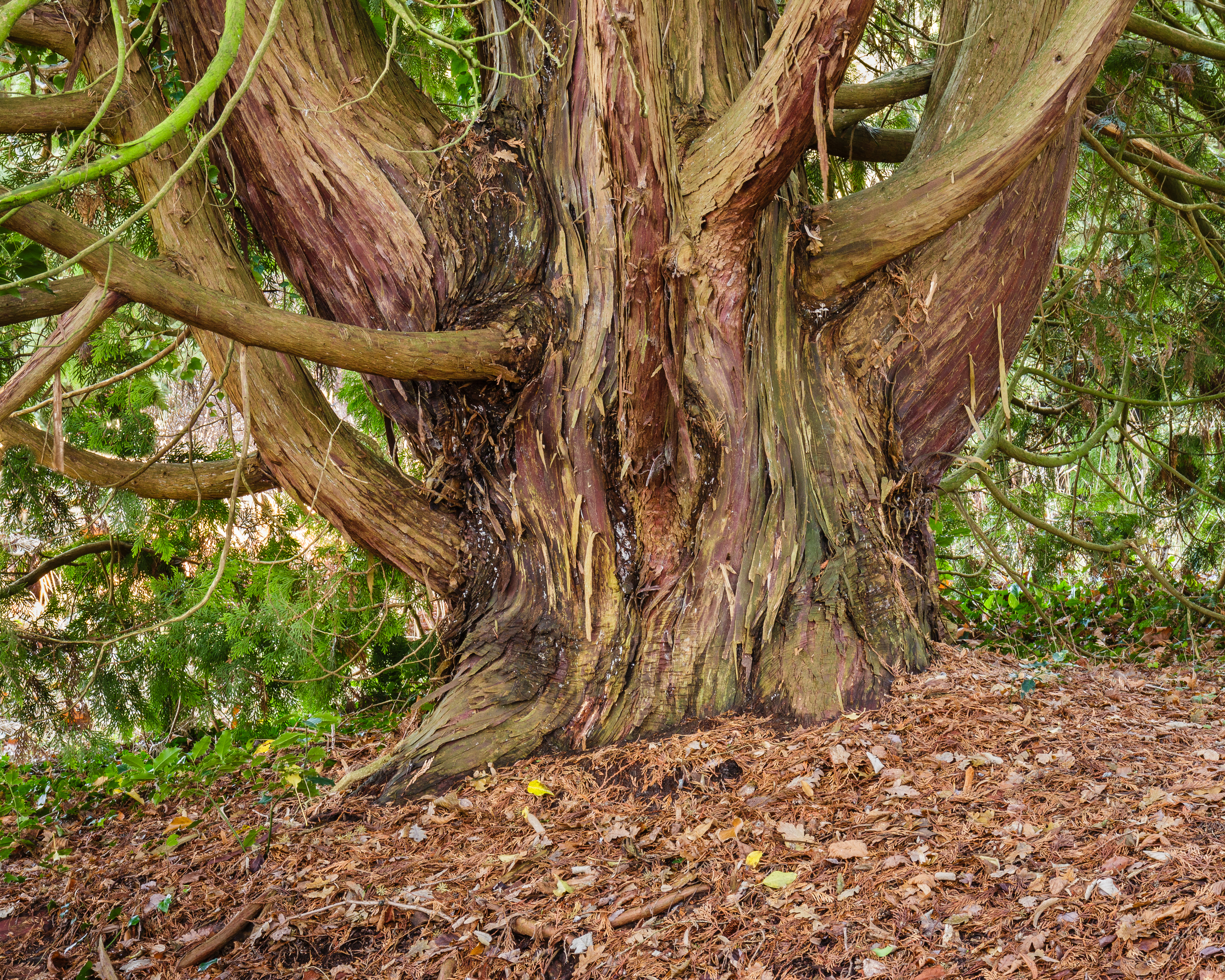
Typical rootstock of a Thuja standishii. (arborvitaes.)

The foliage forms in flat sprays with scale-like leaves 2–4 mm long, matte green above, and with narrow white stomatal bands below. The cones are oval, yellow-green ripening red-brown, 6–12 mm long and 4–5 mm broad (opening to 8 mm broad), with 6–10 overlapping scales.

It is an important timber tree in Japan, grown in forestry plantations for its durable, waterproof, attractively scented wood.

There is some evidence that extracts of T. standishii have biological activity. It contains a compound called standishinal which has shown relatively potent effects on the enzyme aromatase. It acts as an inhibitor, thus decreasing the synthesis of estradiol in the human body. This compound has been used in research and derivatives of it have shown even stronger inhibition of aromatase. It is one of the Five Sacred Trees of Kiso.
