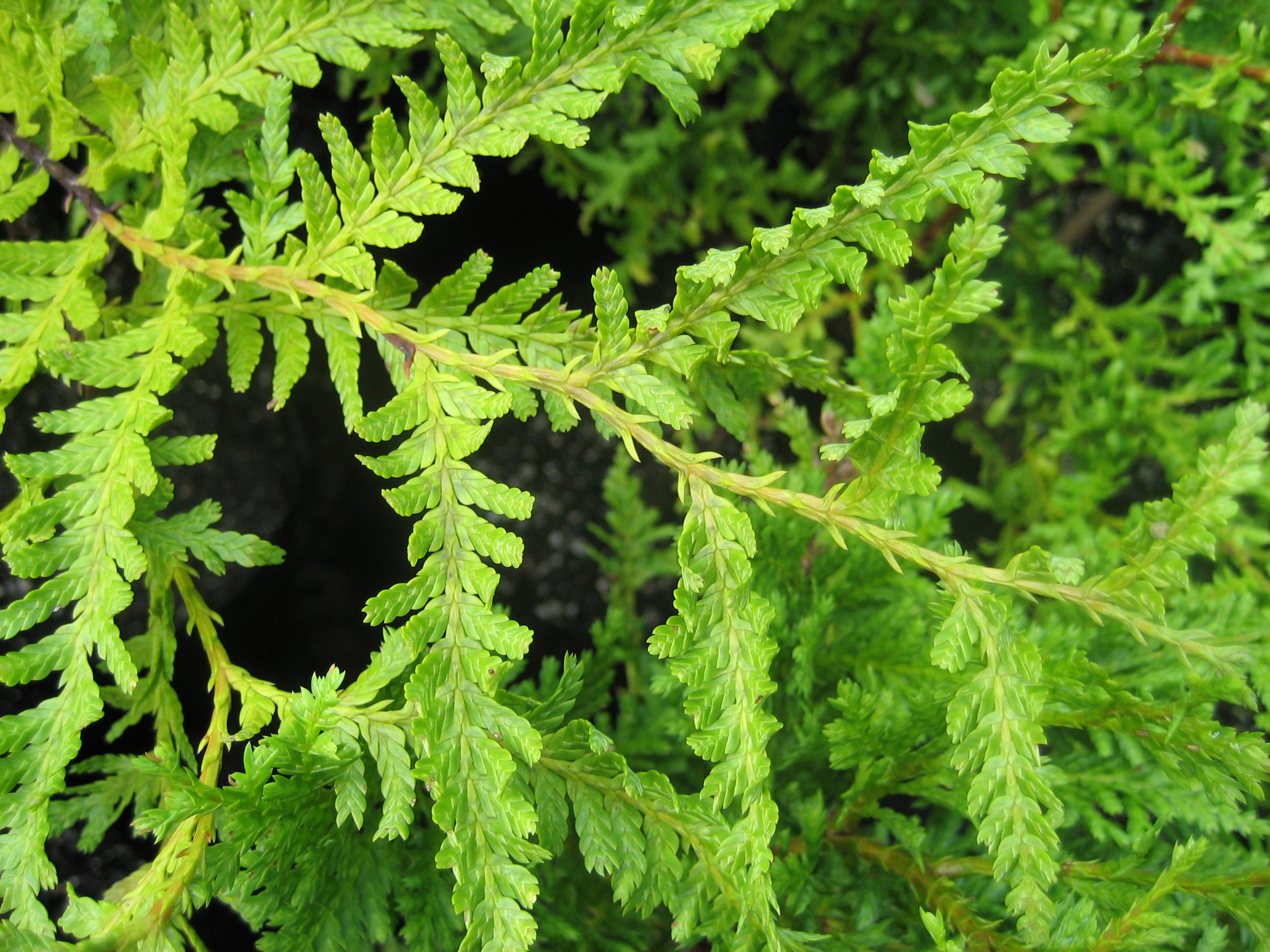
- Foliage showing flat sprays

Conservation status
- Near Threatened (IUCN 3.1)

Scientific classification
- Kingdom: Plantae
- Clade: Embryophytes
- Clade: Tracheophytes
- Clade: Gymnosperms
- Division: Pinophyta
- Class: Pinopsida
- Order: Cupressales
- Family: Cupressaceae
- Genus: Libocedrus
- Species: L. plumosa

Binomial name
- Libocedrus plumosa (D.Don) Sarg.

= Libocedrus plumosa =

Species of conifer endemic to New Zealand

Libocedrus plumosa, the kawaka, is a species of conifer in the cypress family, Cupressaceae, that is endemic to New Zealand.

== Distribution ==
The tree is native to the North Island from south of 35°S and from Cape Farewell to Whanganui Inlet area and locally at the north end of the South Island, near Nelson (41° S).

It grows from sea level up to 600 metres (2,000 ft) in elevation, in temperate rainforests.

It is an IUCN Red List Near threatened species, that is endangered by habitat loss.

== Description ==
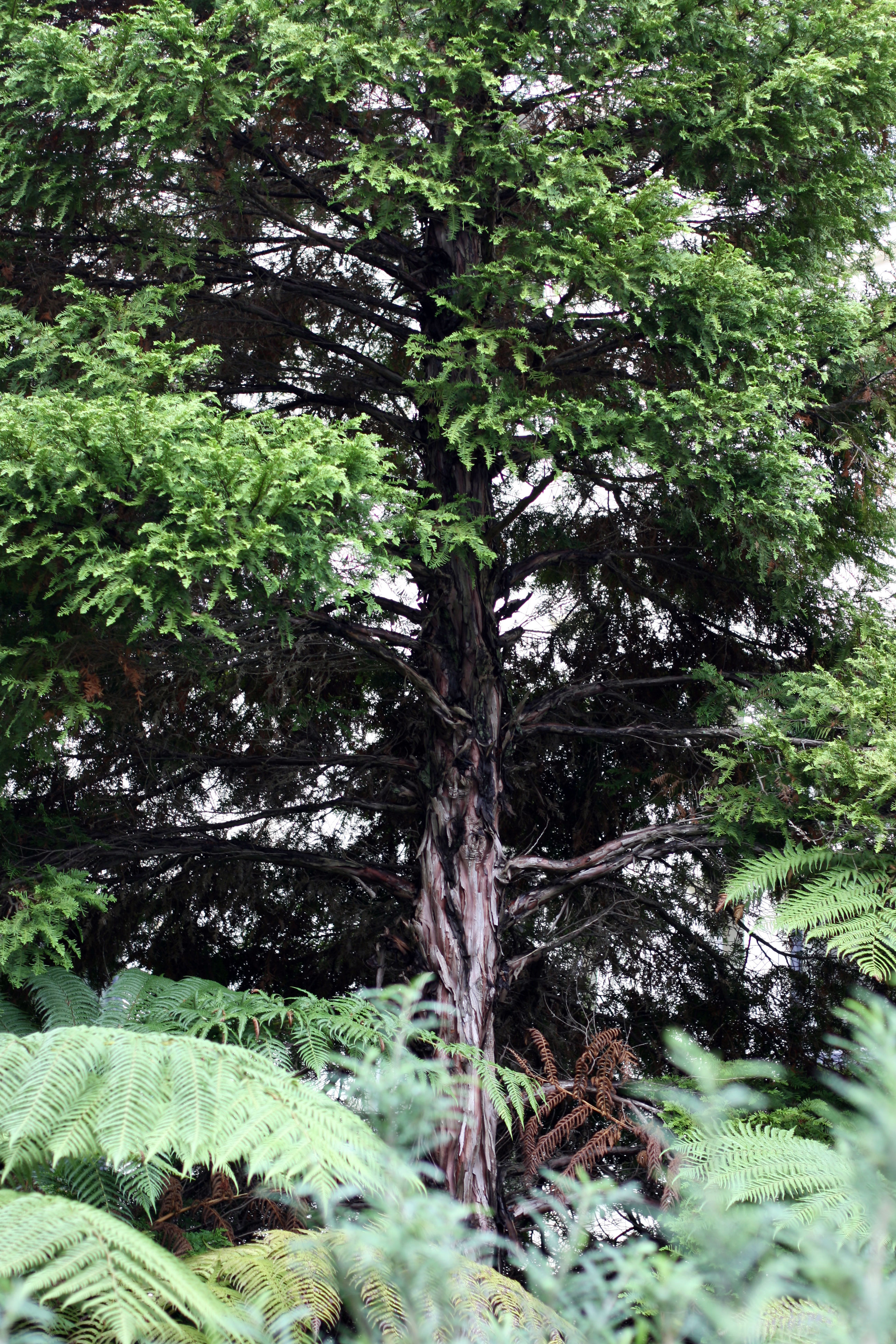
Young 'kawaka' tree.

Libocedrus plumosa is an evergreen coniferous tree growing to 30–35 metres (98–115 ft) tall, with a trunk up to 3 metres (9.8 ft) diameter. The bark is loose, fibrous and light brown.

The foliage is arranged in flattened sprays; the leaves are scale-like, arranged in opposite decussate pairs on the shoots; the facial leaves are 1–2 mm long and 1 mm broad, and the lateral leaves distinctly larger, 2–5 mm long and 1.5–2 mm broad.

The seed cones are cylindrical, 12–18 mm long, with four scales each with a prominent curved spine-like bract; they are arranged in two opposite decussate pairs around a small central columella; the outer pair of scales is small and sterile, the inner pair large, each bearing two winged seeds. They are mature about six to eight months after pollination. The pollen cones are 3–5 mm long.

== Cultivation ==
The kawaka has been planted as an ornamental tree in several parts of the British Isles, including as far north as Castlewellan, Northern Ireland.
