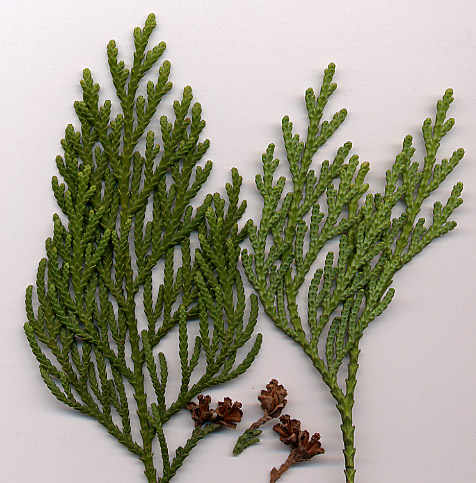
- Thuja standishii foliage and cones

Scientific classification
- Kingdom: Plantae
- Clade: Tracheophytes
- Clade: Gymnosperms
- Division: Pinophyta
- Class: Pinopsida
- Order: Cupressales
- Family: Cupressaceae
- Subfamily: Cupressoideae
- Genus: Thuja; L.

Type species
- Thuja occidentalis L.

= Thuja =

Genus of conifers

Thuja (/ˈθjuːjə/ THEW-yə) is a genus of coniferous trees or shrubs in the cypress family, Cupressaceae. There are five species, two native to North America and three native to eastern Asia. The genus is most closely related to Thujopsis. Members are commonly known as arborvitaes (from the Latin term for 'tree of life'), thujas, or New World cedars.

== Description ==
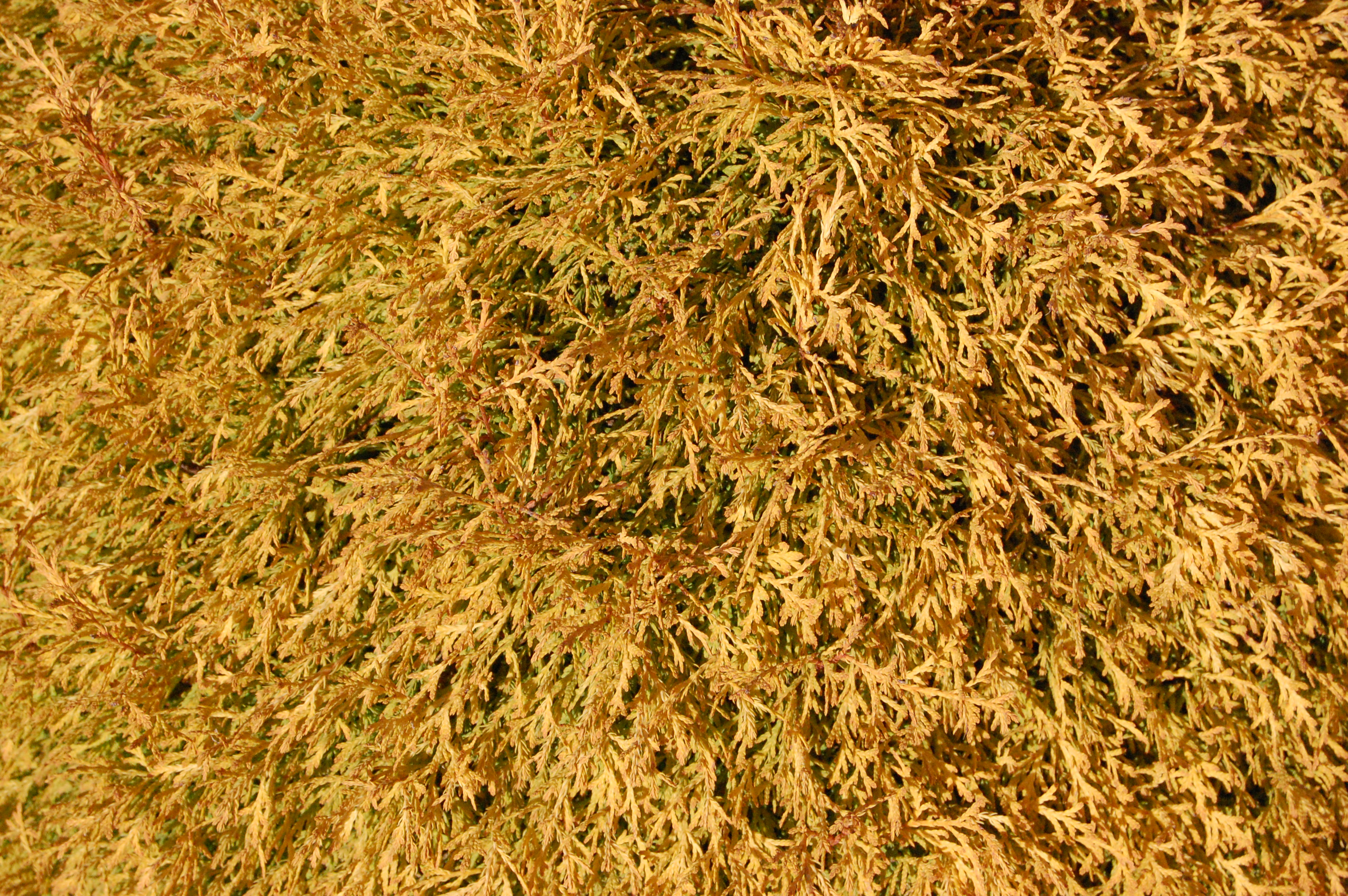
Foliage of the cultivar 'Rheingold'

Thuja are coniferous trees that grow up to 10 to 200 feet (3 to 61 metres) tall, with stringy-textured reddish-brown bark. The shoots are flat, with side shoots only in a single plane. The leaves are scale-like and 1 to 10 mm (0.039 to 0.394 in) long, except young seedlings in their first year, which have needle-like leaves. The scale leaves are arranged in alternating decussate pairs in four rows along the twigs. The male cones are small, inconspicuous, and are located at the tips of the twigs. The female cones start out similarly inconspicuous, but grow to about 1 to 2 cm (0.39 to 0.79 in) long at maturity when 6–8 months old; they have 6-12 overlapping, thin, leathery scales, each scale bearing 1–2 small seeds with a pair of narrow lateral wings.

The species in the genus grow with flattened branchlets. The leaves are arranged in flattened fan-shaped groupings with resin-glands, and oppositely grouped in 4 ranks. The mature leaves are different from younger leaves, with those on larger branchlets having sharp, erect, free apices. The leaves on flattened lateral branchlets are crowded into appressed groups and scale-like and the lateral pairs are keeled. With the exception of T. plicata, the lateral leaves are shorter than the facial leaves (Li et al. 2005). The solitary flowers are produced terminally. Pollen cones with 2-6 pairs of 2-4 pollen-bearing sporophylls. Seed cones are ellipsoid, typically 9 to 14 mm (0.35 to 0.55 in) long, and mature and open the first year. The thin woody cone scales number from 4-6 pairs and are persistent and overlapping, with an oblong shape, they are also basifixed. The central 2-3 pairs of cone scales are fertile. The seed cones produce 1 to 3 seeds per scale, the seeds are lenticular in shape and equally 2 winged. Seedlings produce 2 cotyledons.

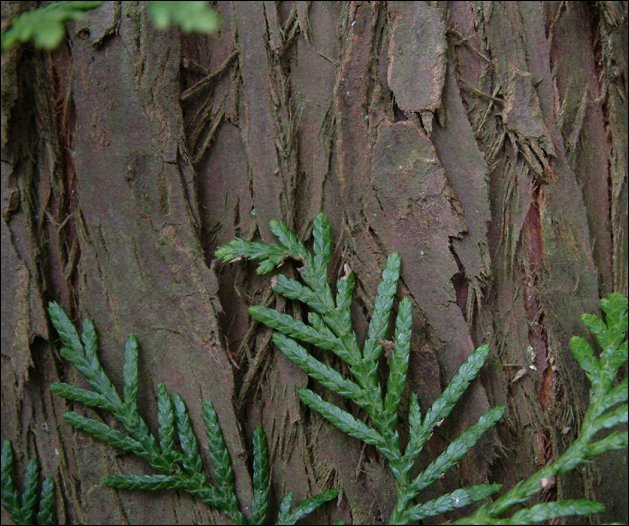
T. plicata bark, foliage

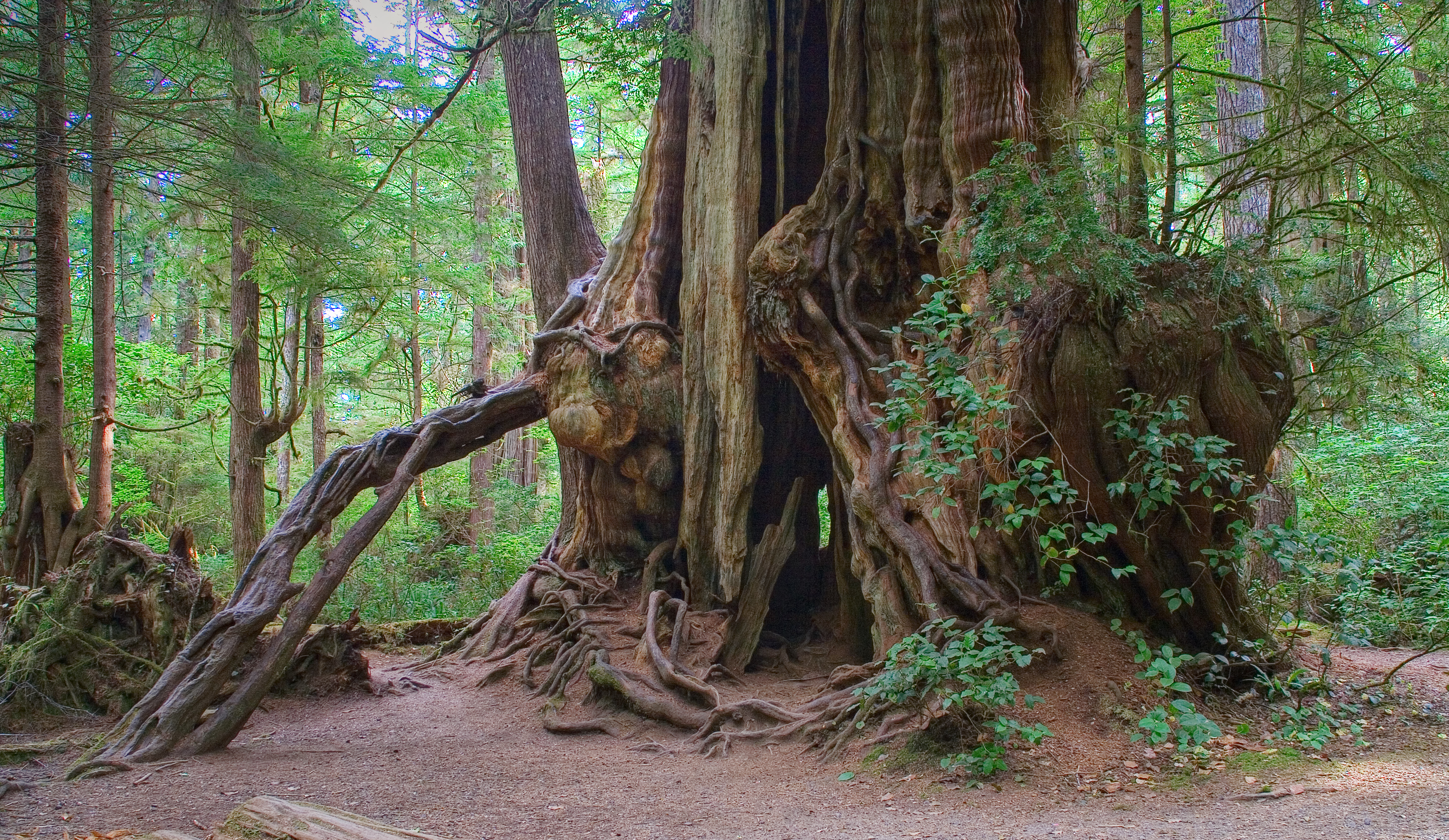
Old growth T. plicata, Olympic Peninsula, USA

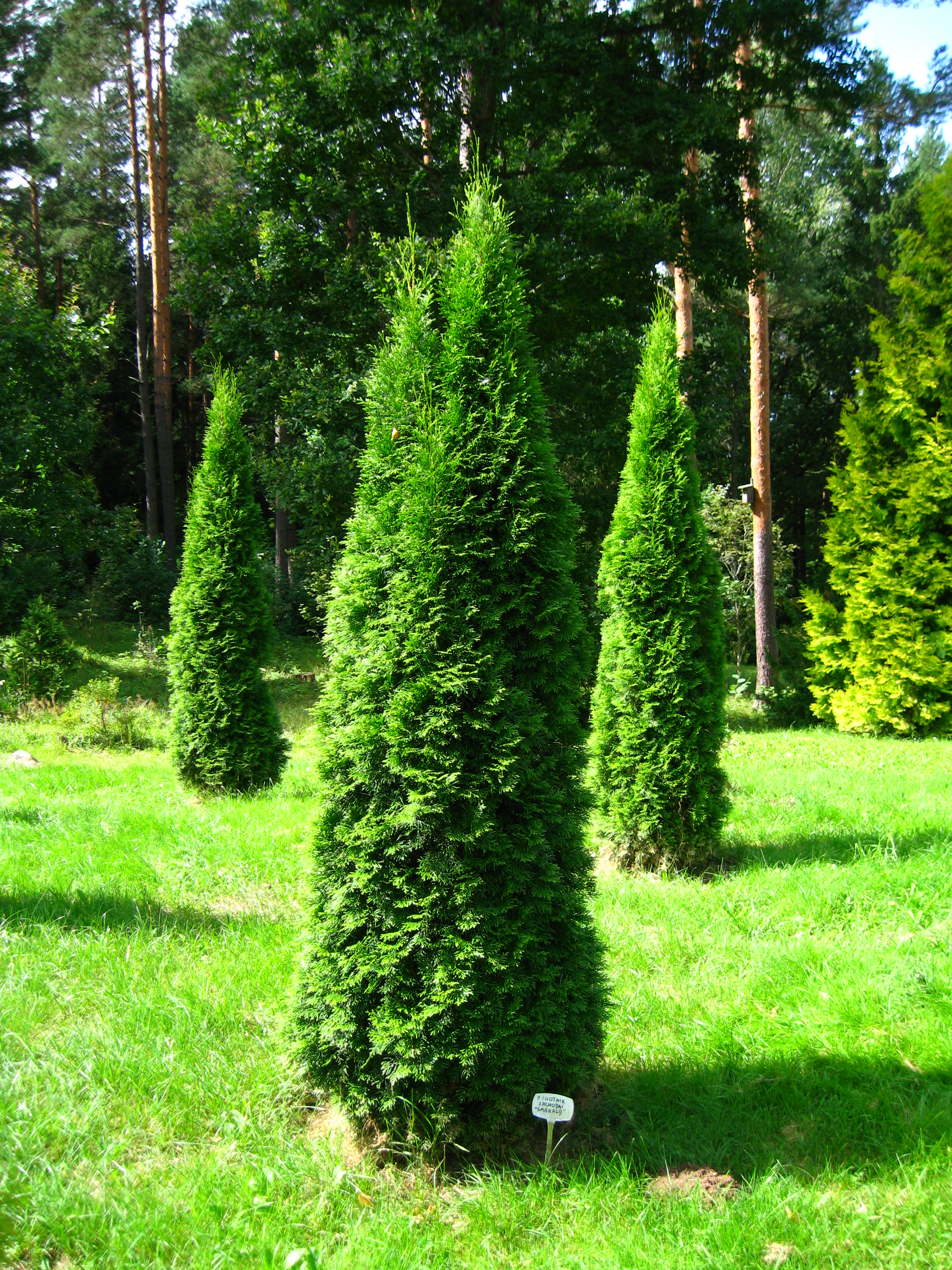
Cultivars of T. occidentalis in an arboretum

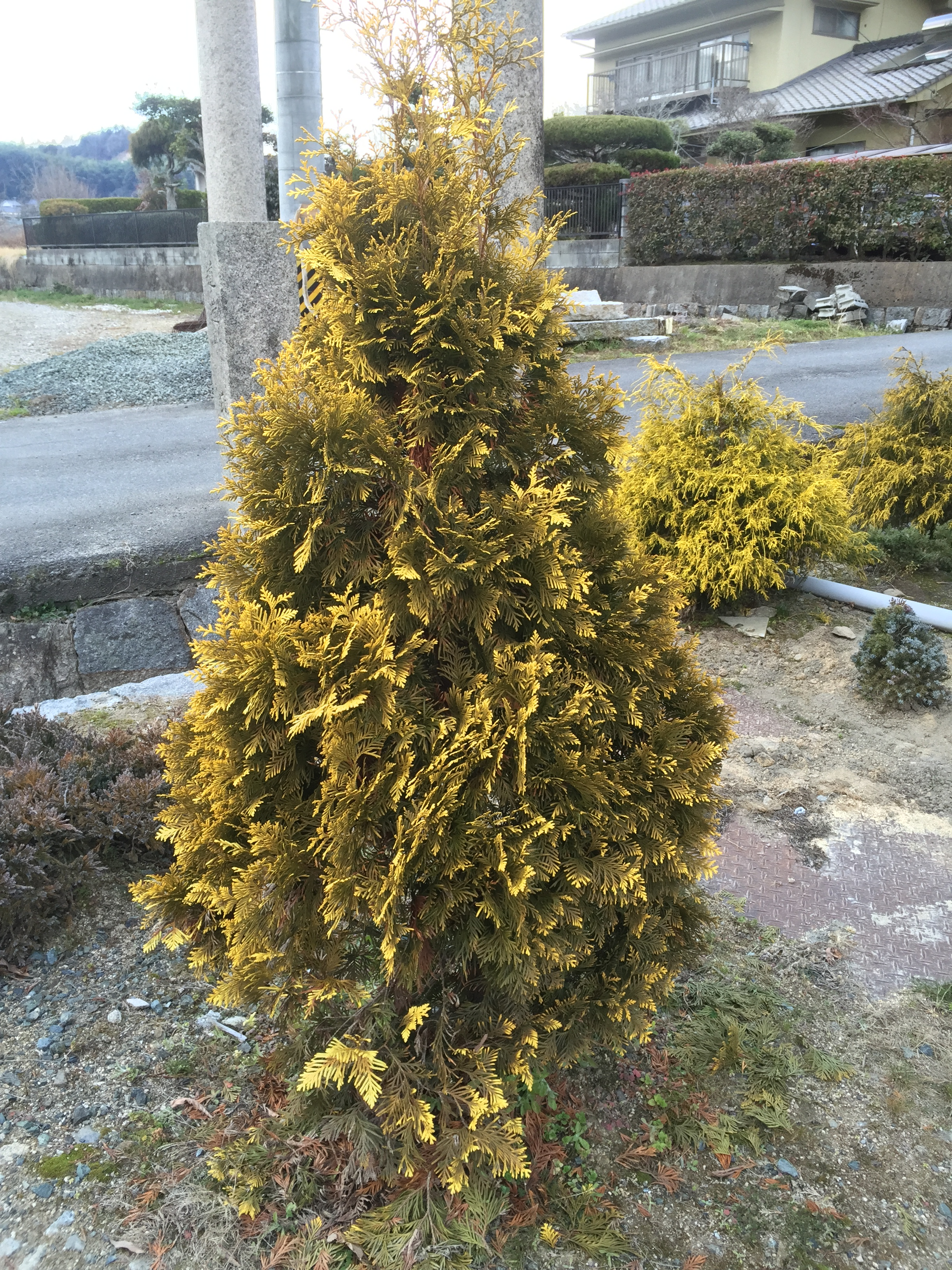
Thuja occidentalis cultivar 'EuropeGold'

A hybrid between T. standishi and T. plicata has been named as the cultivar Thuja 'Green Giant'.

Another very distinct and only distantly related species, formerly treated as Thuja orientalis, is now treated in a genus of its own, as Platycladus orientalis. The closest relatives of Thuja are Thujopsis dolabrata, distinct in its thicker foliage and stouter cones, and Tetraclinis articulata (Ancient Greek θυία or θύα, formerly classed in the genus and after which Thuja is named), distinct in its quadrangular foliage (not flattened) and cones with four thick, woody scales.

The genus Thuja, like many other forms of conifers, is represented by ancestral forms in Cretaceous rocks of northern Europe, and with the advance of time is found to migrate from northerly to more southerly regions, until during the Pliocene period, when it disappeared from Europe. Thuja is also known in the Miocene beds of the Dakotas.

== Taxonomy ==
=== Phylogeny ===
Stull et al. 2021

- Thuja
  - T. plicata
  - - T. koraiensis
    - - T. sutchuenensis
      - - T. occidentalis
        - T. standishii

=== Species ===
The five extant species are:

Image	Scientific name	Common name	Distribution
	Thuja koraiensis Nakai	Korean thuja	Jilin, Korea
	Thuja occidentalis L.	eastern arborvitae, northern whitecedar	E Canada (Manitoba to Nova Scotia), E United States (primarily Northeast, Great Lakes, Appalachians)
	Thuja plicata Donn ex D.Don	western redcedar	Alaska to Washington, east to Northern Idaho and western Montana, and south along coast into Northern California
	Thuja standishii (Gordon) Carrière	Japanese thuja	Honshu, Shikoku
	Thuja sutchuenensis (Gordon) Carrière	Sichuan thuja	Sichuan, Chongqing China almost extinct in the wild

Species formerly placed in Thuja include:

- Austrocedrus chilensis (D.Don) Pic.Serm. & Bizzarri (as T. chilensis D.Don)
- Callitris rhomboidea R.Br. ex Rich. (as T. australis Poir.)
- Cupressus nootkatensis D.Don (as T. excelsa Bong.)
- Dacrycarpus imbricatus (Blume) de Laub (as T. javanica Burm.f.)
- Glyptostrobus pensilis (Staunton ex D.Don) K.Koch (as T. pensilis Staunton ex D.Don)
- Libocedrus plumosa (D.Don) Sarg. (as T. doniana Hook.)
- Platycladus orientalis (L.) Franco (as T. orientalis L.)
- Tamarix aphylla (L.) H.Karst. (as T. aphylla L.)
- Tetraclinis articulata (Vahl) Mast. (as T. articulata Vahl)
- Thujopsis dolabrata (Thunb. ex L.f.) Siebold & Zucc. (as T. dolabrata Thunb. ex L.f.)
- Widdringtonia nodiflora (L.) Powrie (as T. cupressoides L.)

and many more

The extant species Thuja sutchuenensis was believed to be extinct until 1999, when a small population was discovered in southeast China.

The genus is believed to be monophyletic.

== Ecology ==
Thuja species are used as food plants by the larvae of some Lepidoptera species including autumnal moth, the engrailed and juniper pug. The foliage is also readily eaten by deer, and where deer population density is high, can adversely affect the growth of young trees and the establishment of seedlings.

== Distribution ==
The genus Thuja has current populations in both North America and East Asia. T. plicata has wide distribution in the Pacific Northwest from Northern California to Alaska, reaching East into Idaho and central British Columbia. T. occidentalis has populations in the Northeastern United States, reaching north into Ontario and Quebec, with some distribution as far south as Tennessee.

T. standishii has populations in mountainous regions of Honshu and Shikoku islands in Japan, with no recorded population in the north of the country. T. koraiensis is native to both North and South Korea and has a small population in the Northern Chinese province of Jilin. The newly rediscovered species T. sutchuenensis has extremely limited distribution in the mountains of Chengkou county in southeastern China.

== Evolution and paleobiogeography ==
Current research suggests that Thuja originated in the Americas and migrated to East Asia via the Bering land bridge in the Miocene. Fossil records show that Thuja was significantly more widely distributed during the late Cretaceous and early Tertiary than we see today. The oldest known Thuja fossil is of T. polaris (an extinct species) from the Paleocene of Ellesmere Island in present-day Nunavut, Canada.

Other hypotheses of Thuja origin involved an East Asian origin, with the genus migrating twice; once east into North-western America and then west to the North-eastern America, but since no reliable fossil records of Thuja exist in either Western Asia or Europe, the possibility can be eliminated.

== Systematics ==
Thuja is a monophyletic genus that sits within the order Pinales in the Cupressaceae. Thuja is in the Cupressoid clade and is sister to the genus Thujopsis. The sister relationship between Thuja and Thujopsis is supported with 100% bootstrap support and 1.0 posterior probability.

Within the genus the taxonomy is in flux, but most recent research based on molecular analysis of plastomes in the genus Thuja showed evidence for a new grouping, with two sister clades: T. standishii and T. koraiensis together and T. occidentalis and T. sutchuenensis together, with T. plicata sister to T. occidentalis and T. sutchuenensis. This newest grouping is hypothesized to be the result of reticulate evolution and hybridization within the genus.

== Uses of thuja ==
They are widely grown as ornamental trees, and extensively used for hedges. A number of cultivars are grown and used in landscapes. Homeowners will sometimes plant them as privacy trees. The cultivar 'Green Giant' is popular as a very vigorous hedging plant, growing up to 80 cm/year when young.

The wood is light, soft and aromatic. It can be easily split and resists decay. The wood has been used for many applications from making chests that repel moths to shingles. Thuja poles are also often used to make fence posts and rails. The wood of Thuja plicata is commonly used for guitar sound boards. Its combination of light weight and resistance to decay has also led to T. plicata being widely used for the construction of bee hives.

T. plicata is an important tree to the First Nations people of the Pacific Northwest and is sometimes called "Canoe Tree" because of its use as a material for Native American canoes.

Oil of Thuja contains the terpene thujone which has been studied for its GABA receptor antagonizing effects, with potentially lethal properties. Cedarwood oil and cedar leaf oil, which are derived from Thuja occidentalis, have different properties and uses.

The Indigenous peoples of Canada used the scaled leaves of Thuja occidentalis to make a tea that has been shown to contain 50 mg of vitamin C per 100 grams; this helped prevent and treat scurvy.

In the 19th century, Thuja was commonly used as an externally applied tincture or ointment for the treatment of warts, ringworm and thrush, and a local injection of the tincture was used for treating venereal warts.

A 2017 trial showed that its extract effectively killed both gram-positive and gram-negative bacteria.

As with many Cupressaceae, Thuja can induce allergic reactions, including skin, eye and breathing problems.
