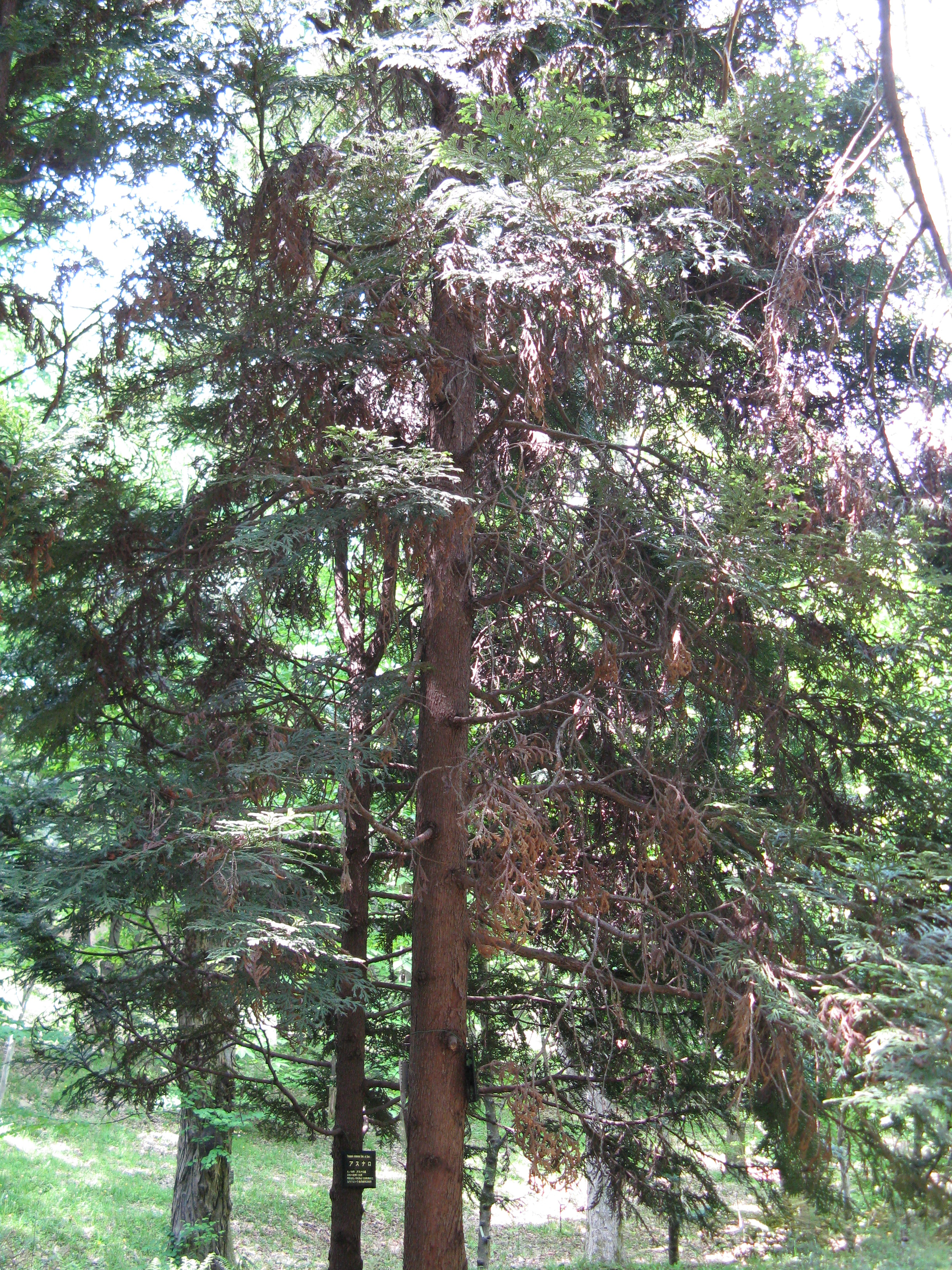

Conservation status
- Least Concern (IUCN 3.1)

Scientific classification
- Kingdom: Plantae
- Clade: Tracheophytes
- Clade: Gymnosperms
- Division: Pinophyta
- Class: Pinopsida
- Order: Cupressales
- Family: Cupressaceae
- Subfamily: Cupressoideae
- Genus: Thujopsis
- Species: T. dolabrata

Binomial name
- Thujopsis dolabrata (Thunb. ex L. f.) Siebold & Zucc.

= Thujopsis =

Genus of conifers

Thujopsis (/θjuːˈdʒɒpsɪs/) is a genus of conifer in the cypress family, Cupressaceae, the sole member of which is Thujopsis dolabrata. It is endemic to Japan, where it is known as asunaro (あすなろ). It is similar to the closely related genus Thuja (arborvitae), differing in its broader, thicker leaves and cones.

== Etymology ==
A popular allegory for the etymology of asunaro is asu wa hinoki ni narou (明日はヒノキになろう), literally "tomorrow it will become a hinoki cypress", i.e. the tree looks like a smaller version of the common hinoki cypress.

In Japan, it is also known as hiba (ひば), among many regional variations: asunaro is called ate (貴, 阿天) in Ishikawa, atebi on Sado Island, among other names. Outside of Japan, it is also known as false arborvitae or hiba arborvitae.

== Description ==
Thujopsis is a medium to large coniferous tree, reaching up to 40 m tall and 1.5 m trunk diameter, with red-brown bark which peels in vertical strips. The leaves are arranged in decussate pairs, scale-like, 3–10 mm long, glossy green above, and marked with vivid white stomatal bands below; they have a distinctive thick, almost fleshy texture. The seed cones are ovoid, 7–15 mm long and 6–10 mm diameter, with 6–12 thick scales, brown with a violet-white wax bloom when fresh. A characteristic extractive, a natural product named as thujaplicinol, has been found in this species, mostly in its needles, outer bark and xylem.

== Taxonomy ==
There are two varieties:

- Thujopsis dolabrata var. dolabrata. Central and southern Japan. Shoots less densely branched with slightly larger leaves, and strongly thickened cone scales.
- Thujopsis dolabrata var. hondai. Northern Japan. Shoots more densely branched with slightly smaller leaves, and less thickened cone scales.

== Uses ==
The asunaro is a valued ornamental tree both in its native Japan, where it is commonly planted around temples as well as in gardens, and also in Europe and North America. In the latter two regions, planting is confined to areas with good rainfall or in gardens with reliable irrigation, as the species is not drought tolerant. In the UK it has gained the Royal Horticultural Society's Award of Garden Merit.

It is also used to a small extent in forestry in Japan, grown for the valuable wood, which is durable and scented, similar to that of Thuja plicata.

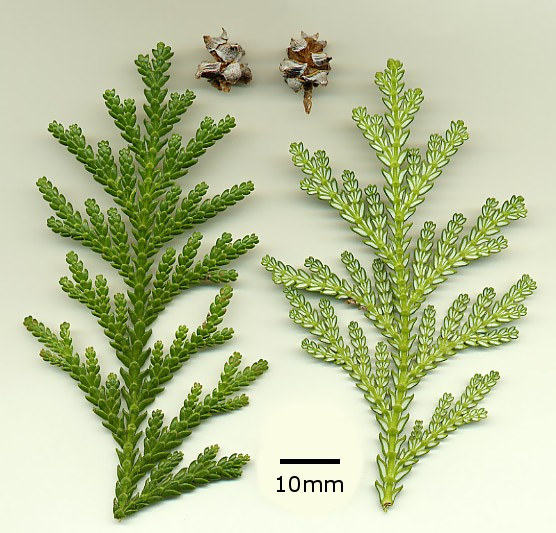
Upper side of shoot, lower side of shoot, mature cones

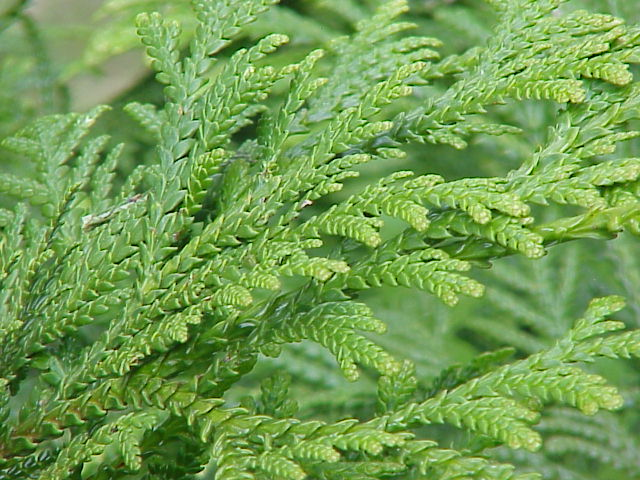
Foliage

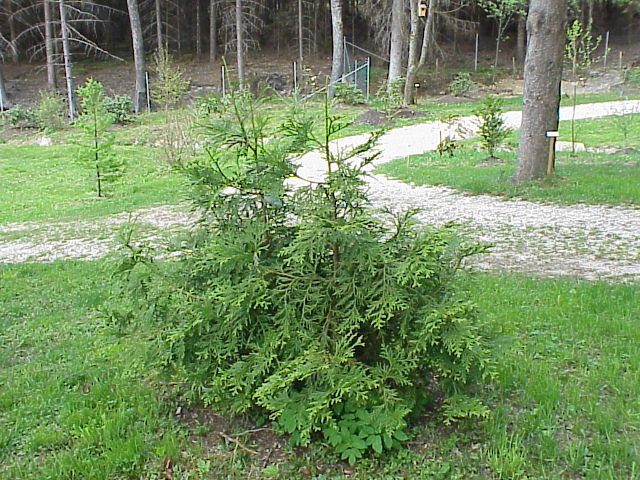
Young plant
