= Ulansuhai Nur =

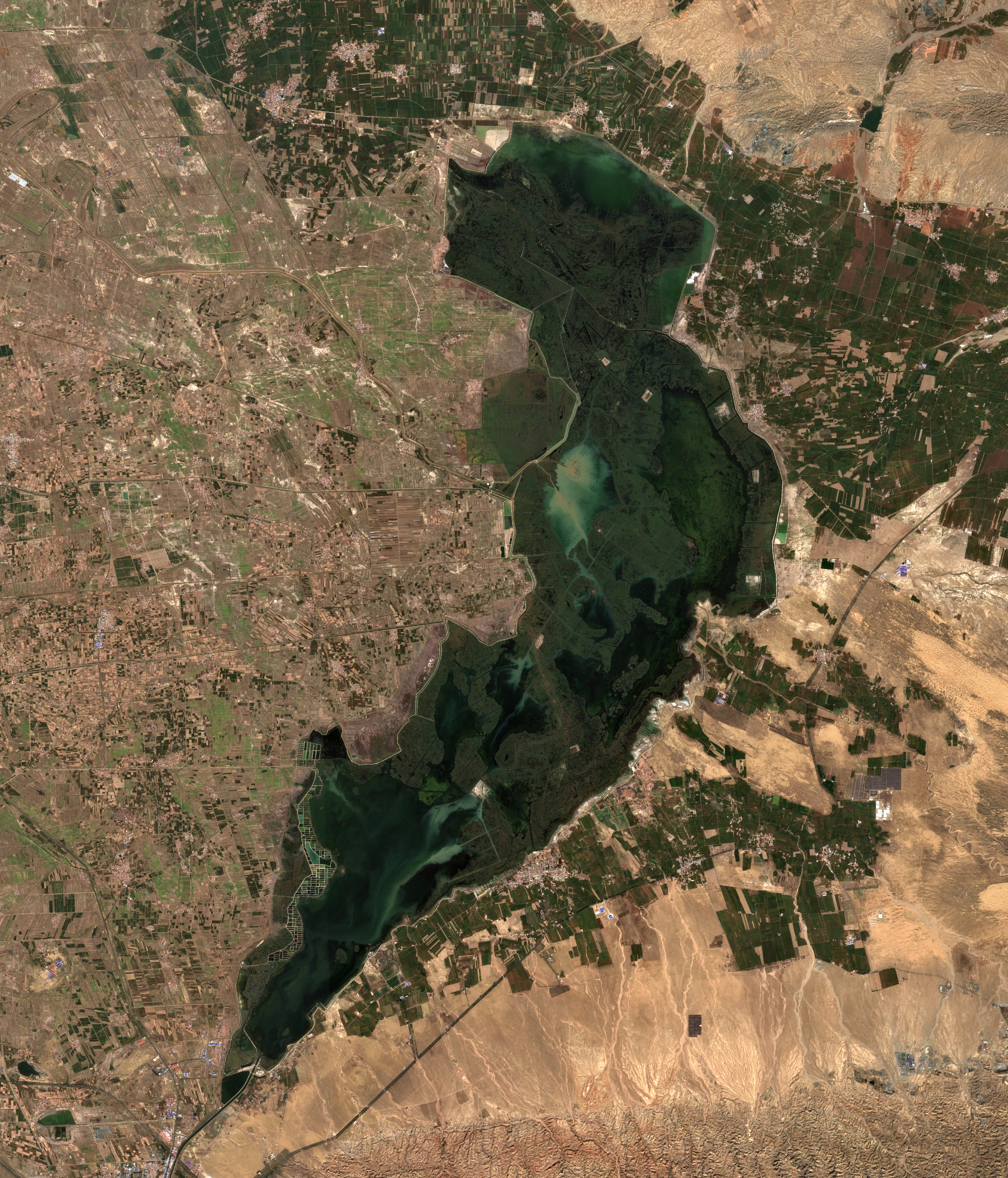

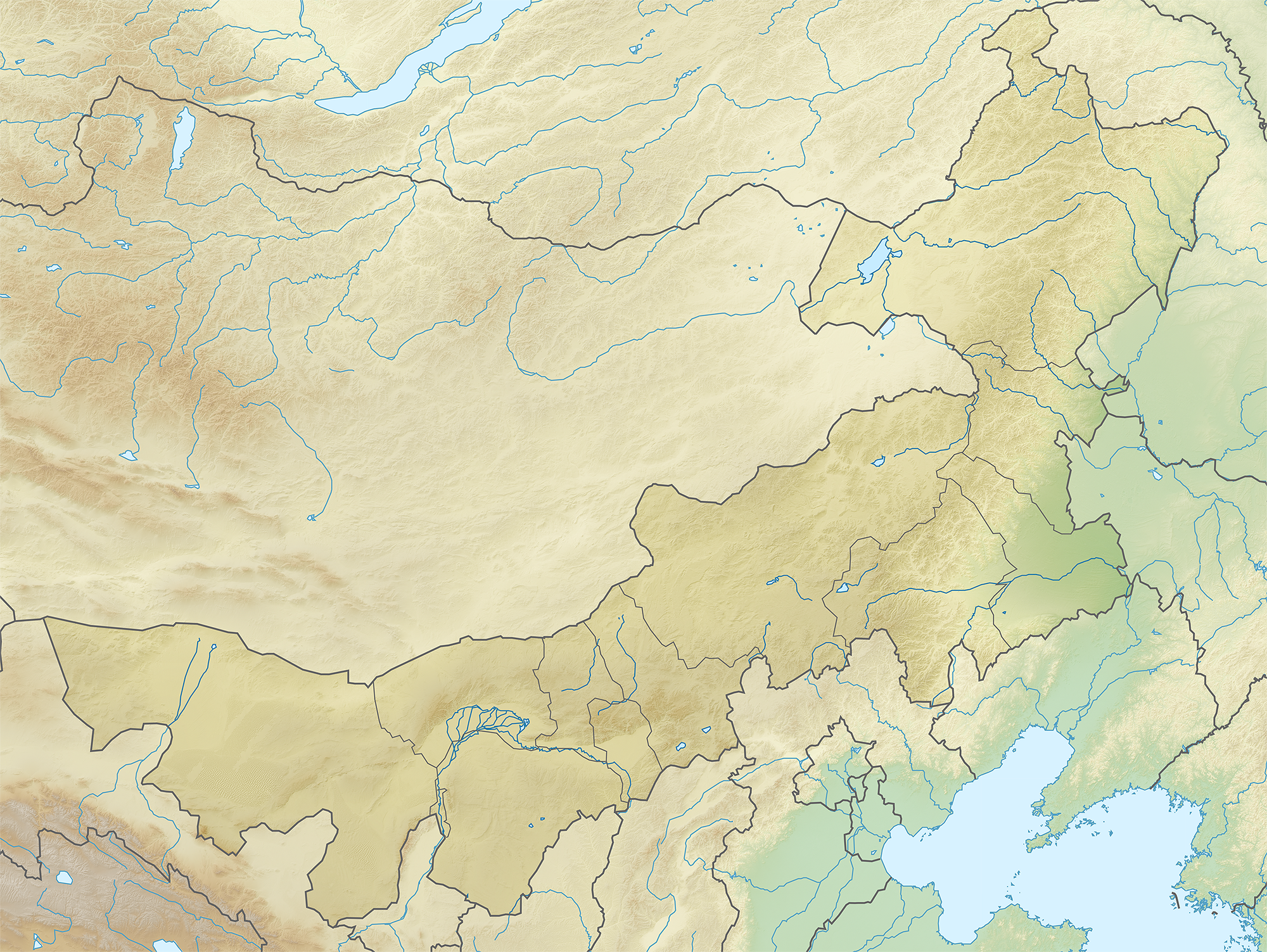
- Location within Inner Mongolia
- Coordinates: 40°56′N 108°52′E
- Lake type: Fresh water lake
- Catchment area: 11,800 km^{2} (4,600 sq mi)
- Basin countries: China
- Max. length: 35.4 km (22 mi)
- Max. width: 12.7 km (8 mi)
- Surface area: 233 km^{2} (100 sq mi)
- Average depth: 1.12 m (4 ft)
- Max. depth: 2.5 m (8 ft)
- Water volume: 328×10^{6} m^{3} (11.6×10^{9} cu ft)
- Surface elevation: 1,018.79 m (3,342 ft)
- Settlements: Urad Front Banner

Ulansuhai Nur or Wuliangsuhai (Chinese: 乌梁素海; pinyin: Wūliángsù Hǎi) is a freshwater lake in located in southwest Inner Mongolia, North China, on the north (left) bank of Yellow River's Ordos Loop. The lake has an area of 233 km^{2} (90 sq mi), a north–south length of 35.4 km (22.0 mi) and mean east–west width of 6.6 km (4.1 mi) (max 12.7 km or 7.9 mi), with a drainage area of 11,800 km^{2} (4,600 sq mi) at an elevation of 1,018.79 m (3,342.5 ft).

Ulansuhai Nur is a rare big multi-functional lake in the desolate and drought-stricken grassland. It has 150 km^{2} (58 sq mi) of bulrush square kilometers with nearly 200 species of birds and over 20 species of fish.
