= Thuja sutchuenensis =

Conservation status
- Endangered (IUCN 3.1)

Scientific classification
- Kingdom: Plantae
- Clade: Tracheophytes
- Clade: Gymnosperms
- Division: Pinophyta
- Class: Pinopsida
- Order: Cupressales
- Family: Cupressaceae
- Genus: Thuja
- Species: T. sutchuenensis

Binomial name
- Thuja sutchuenensis Franch.

Species of conifer

Thuja sutchuenensis, the Sichuan thuja, is a species of coniferous tree in the cypress family, Cupressaceae. It is native to China, where it is an endangered local endemic in Chengkou County (Chongqing Municipality, formerly part of Sichuan province), on the southern slope of the Daba Mountains.

== Description ==
It is a small or medium-sized tree, reaching possibly 20 m tall, though no trees of this size are currently known. The foliage forms in flat sprays with scale-like leaves 1.5–4 mm long, green above, and with narrow white stomatal bands below. The cones are oval, green ripening brown, 5–8 mm long and 3-4.2 mm broad (opening to 7 mm broad), with 8-10 overlapping scales.

== Discovery and rediscovery ==
It was first described in 1899 from specimens collected by the French botanist Paul Guillaume Farges in 1892 and 1900, but was not seen again thereafter, despite many searches, for almost 100 years and was presumed to be extinct due to over-cutting for its valuable scented wood. A small number of specimens were however rediscovered in 1999, growing on very inaccessible steep ridges close to (or at the same site) where Farges had first found it. The area of its occurrence has now been designated a Special Protection Area in order to protect the species.
