= Center for Scientific Studies in the Arts =

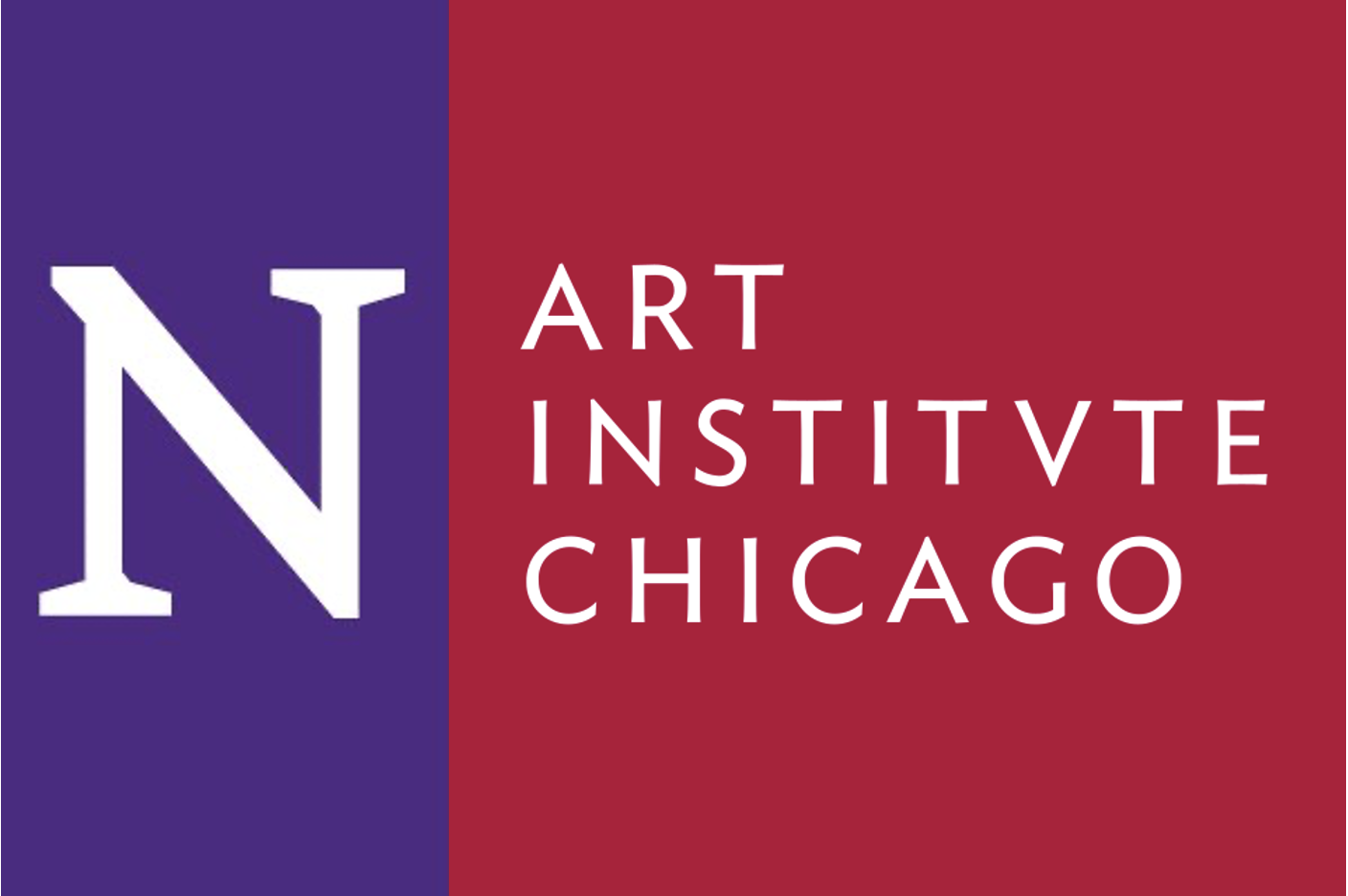
- Established: 2004
- Mission: To conduct object-based research, share Center expertise and foster effective coordination of research efforts, and educate scientists and engineers and their students in conservation science
- Focus: Conservation Science,
- Director: Francesca Casadio; Aggelos K. Katsaggelos
- Address: 2145 Sheridan Road, Tech K111
- Location: Evanston, Illinois, United States
- Website: scienceforart.northwestern.edu/index.html

The Center for Scientific Studies in the Arts (NU-ACCESS) is a collaborative initiative between Northwestern University and the Art Institute of Chicago. The institute is dedicated to the convergence diverse scientific disciplines applied to the realm of art conservation and study. Established in 2004 and supported by the Andrew W. Mellon Foundation, the center employs scientific and technical methods to investigate and preserve artistic and cultural artifacts, helping to uncover details about their creation, history, and conservation.

Researchers and scientists at the center employ a variety of techniques, including imaging, spectroscopy, and materials analysis, to study artworks in a non-invasive and non-destructive manner. The center also works to develop new technologies and methods for art investigation and to train the next generation of researchers in similar fields.

== History ==
The Center for Scientific Studies in the Arts, also known as the Northwestern University-Art Institute of Chicago Center for Scientific Studies in the Arts (NU-ACCESS), functions at the intersection of art and science, aiming to apply various scientific disciplines to the conservation and analysis of art and cultural heritage.

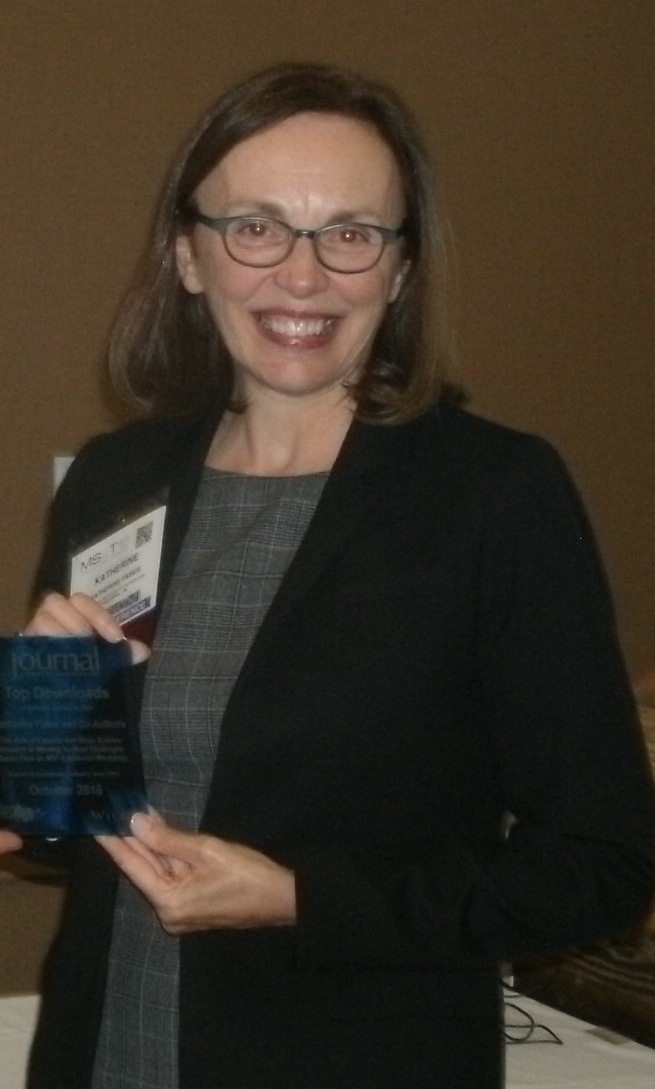
Katherine Faber, co-founder of NU-ACCESS

NU-ACCESS emerged as a response to a growing need for interdisciplinary research in the field of art conservation. It was founded in 2004 by Katherine Faber and Francesca Casadio, who have been instrumental in guiding its research and educational initiatives. Under their leadership, NU-ACCESS grew quickly into a prominent facility for art conservation research, education, and collaboration, furthering its mission to enhance the understanding and preservation of cultural heritage through scientific innovation and interdisciplinary cooperation. It brings together polymer scientists, chemists, electrical engineers, and ceramists to work collaboratively on the analysis and preservation of artworks. The center's activities range from studying the curing processes of artists’ paints to employing advanced digital imaging techniques for analyzing the evolution of color in artworks.

The center’s mission is threefold: "to conduct object-based and object-inspired research, to extend research opportunities to museums and cultural institutions beyond the Art Institute of Chicago," and to foster educational exchanges between the academic community and professionals in conservation and curation. NU-ACCESS is a novel model in the U.S., moving beyond the traditional confines of museum-based scientific research and creating a centralized hub for collaborative art studies.

In 2013, the center’s impact and reach were further solidified with a $2.5 million grant from the Andrew W. Mellon Foundation. This grant enabled NU-ACCESS to expand its partnership, providing access to its scientific tools and expertise to a broader audience across the country. The center, physically based at Northwestern University, facilitates interdisciplinary research partnerships and serves as a collaborative hub for scholars, scientists, and museum professionals.NU-ACCESS has been involved in numerous research projects and has contributed to significant exhibitions at the Art Institute of Chicago, such as “Matisse: Radical Invention, 1913-1917” and “Watercolors by Winslow Homer: The Color of Light.” Its work has played a crucial role in uncovering details about the materials and techniques used by artists, and in some cases, identifying the origins of unmarked artworks.

== Research ==
The research endeavors at the Center represent a multidisciplinary integration of academic expertise, advanced technological infrastructure, and cross-institutional collaboration. The Center garners the collective knowledge and skills of students and researchers from the McCormick School of Engineering, Weinberg College of Arts and Sciences, and the Mary and Leigh Block Museum of Art at Northwestern University. These academic entities synergize with the conservators, curators, and conservation scientists from the Art Institute of Chicago to create an environment for scholarly inquiry and the advancement of conservation practices.

One of the notable projects involves the use of X-Ray Computed Tomography to non-invasively visualize both the internal and external geometries of art objects, enabling precise measurements of size and density calculations. This technique plays a crucial role in preserving the integrity of the artifacts while still allowing for comprehensive analysis.

In the realm of analog holography, the Center has undertaken a significant project to document and technically study these unique art forms. The project utilizes a range of non-invasive techniques to capture the light field of the hologram, enabling a visualization of the dynamic parallax effect. This holistic approach also facilitates a deeper understanding of the chemical and physical structure of the holograms. A substantial focus has also been placed on the scientific investigation of materials and techniques employed by historical artists. This is exemplified in the detailed study of “Danaë” by Orazio Gentileschi, aiming to discern variations in the Italian master’s painting technique and resolve debates regarding the presence of pentimenti. Similarly, there has been an exploration into the painting materials and techniques of James Tissot, bridging the gap between his academic training and avant-garde movements of his era.

Innovations at the Center extend to the development of new methodologies and analytical tools. The discrimination of plant gums through MALDI-MS represents a novel glycemic approach, while the introduction of an X-Ray Fluorescence Super-Resolution scanning method seeks to achieve higher spatial resolution scans with enhanced Signal-to-Noise Ratios.

The Center also harnesses the capabilities of hyperspectral imaging, applying it in innovative ways for art analysis. This includes the use of 3D hyperspectral data cubes, providing a rich dataset for multivariate analysis, and the implementation of hyperspectral microscopy and holography as molecular characterization tools. Technical studies of artworks extend to the examination of bronze sculptures, contributing to a better understanding of sculptural editions and the involvement of different foundries in artists’ practices. Additionally, the technical study of “Poèmes Barbares” by Paul Gauguin aims to elucidate the role of this painting in Gauguin’s oeuvre using non-invasive analytical techniques. The preservation of historical artworks is further addressed through the study of soap protrusions on oil paintings by Georgia O’Keeffe, guiding conservation decisions, and the use of optical imaging for watermark detection, presenting a cost-effective and efficient alternative to beta-radiography.

Interdisciplinary collaborations have also led to external projects, such as the partnership with Museo de Arte de Puerto Rico in understanding the palette and technique of Puerto Rican artists from the 18th to 20th centuries. Additionally, the use of augmented reality has enabled the investigation of an ancient mummy, providing a unique and interactive experience for both researchers and the public.
