= Conservation and restoration of waterlogged wood =

Preservation of archaeological material

The conservation and restoration of waterlogged wood is the process undertaken by conservator-restorers of caring for and maintaining waterlogged wooden artefacts to preserve their form, and the information they contain. It covers the processes that can be taken by conservators, archaeologists, and other museum professionals to conserve waterlogged wood. This practice includes understanding the composition and agents of deterioration of waterlogged wood, as well as the preventive conservation and interventive conservation measures that can be taken.

== History ==
Waterlogged wood is a wooden object that has been submerged or partially submerged in water and has affected the original intended purpose or look of the object. Waterlogged wood objects can also include wood found within moist soil from archaeological sites, underwater archaeology, maritime debris, or damaged wood objects. Conservation of waterlogged wood has changed throughout time. Due to the delicate structure of this organic material, conservators and museum professionals alike have struggled with finding a textbook method. An example of the conservation of wood and how it has changed over time can be illustrated by the conservation treatments of a Kefermarkt altar. The earliest attempt at wood conservation is recorded as late as 1852–1855, A. Stifter treated the Kefermarkt altar in Austria with table salt in an attempt to protect the wood against pests. In around 1916-1918 Councillor Bolle attempted to protect the wood altar from pests included brushing the wood with petroleum and hexachloroethane. Finally, in 1929 the use of hydrogen cyanide relieved the pest problem and preserved the woods longevity. From a conservation standpoint, waterlogged or not, wood has been difficult to preserve because it is an organic material.

=== About wood as a material ===
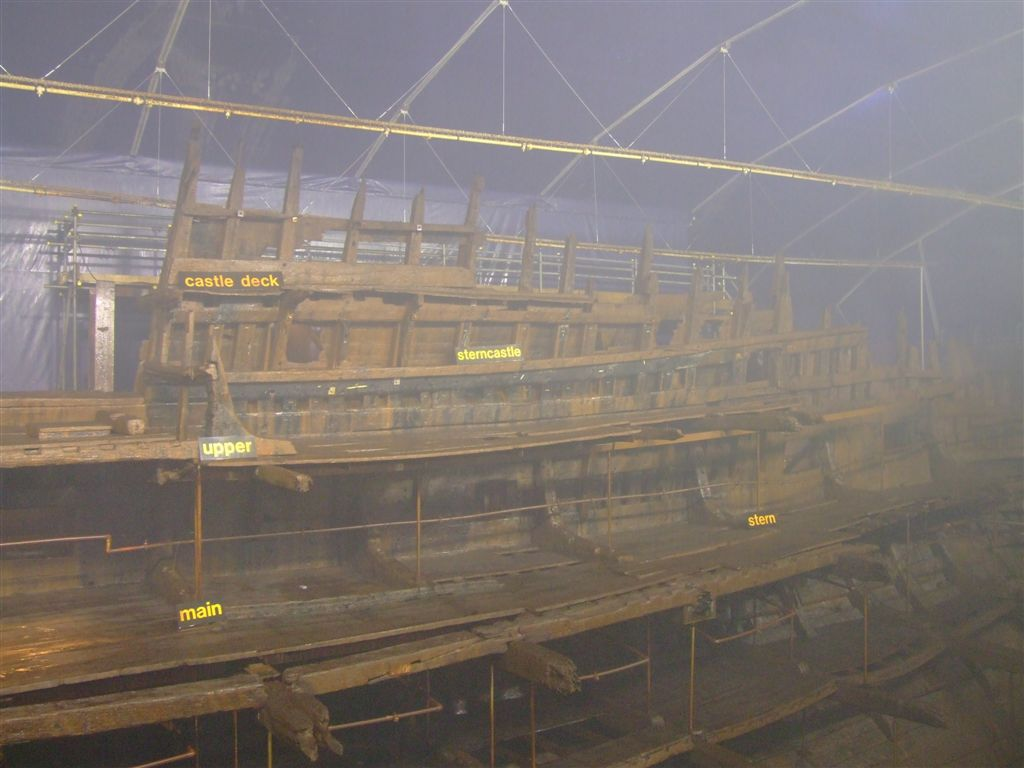
Mary Rose, an English warship, was raised from the ships underwater site on October 11, 1982. Since then there has been extensive conservation and preservation on the vessel. This part of the vessel is almost exclusively wood, making conservation imminent. The extracted vessel is on exhibit at the Mary Rose Museum in the United Kingdom.

Wood is an organic material and decays under biological and chemical degradation when buried or submerged above water or soil. Wood, an organic material produced by plants, are chemically composed of: carbohydrates (cellulose and hemicellulose), lignin and other components (aliphatic acids, alcohols, proteins and inorganic substances) in a smaller amount. The most important composition of the plant is the cellulose. The cellulose accounts for the majority of the cell, about 40% to 50% of the wood's total mass. Hemicellulose represents the second most important carbohydrate and accounts for 20% to 30% of the wood's cell. In cases of extreme wetness or dryness, wood can be preserved until the extreme environment is disrupted. Conservation of wooden waterlogged objects is dependent on the natural wood type and biological structure. Wood is separated into two categories, hardwoods and softwoods. The category the waterlogged wood falls into can determine the amount of porous absorption. Hardwoods are classified as angiosperms. Angiosperms are considered porous woods because of the vessel pores. Softwoods are gymnosperms and are considered non-porous because of the lack of vessel pores. The type of wood and the availability of vessel pores largely affect how conservators treat and preserve waterlogged wood. Waterlogged wood objects can be found in a range of excavations sites. For example, waterlogged wood is something an archaeologist might stumble upon during an excavation either from the wood being submerged or near water or being in moist soil over time. Wood especially survives in archaeological sites that are dark anaerobic environments where bacteria that would cause wood decay cannot live.

== Agents of deterioration ==
There are several agents of deterioration that affect waterlogged wood, mostly due to its environment. The major threats to deterioration include physical forces, pests, incorrect temperature, incorrect relative humidity, and custodial neglect. Attempts at preventive conservation focus on creating a stable storage environment, documentation, and resources to provide the environmental settings that keep an object as stable as possible. The excavation of waterlogged wood removes it from its anaerobic environment, exposing the wood to oxygen which continues the wood's deterioration. An environment with incorrect relative humidity and temperature can encourage bacteria and fungi growth, which adds to the decay and can attract pests. While interventive conservation treatments must balance "remov[ing] the waterlogging water (not the 'bound' water which is part of the wood structure itself) without causing shrinkage or cell wall collapse," preventive conservation tactics include keeping the waterlogged wood in its original state (in water or a solution), with routine maintenance, or reburial of the wood to recreate the anaerobic environment it was once preserved within.

=== Relative humidity and temperature ===
Inconsistent relative humidity and temperature provide the perfect environment for mold and fungi growth on waterlogged wood. Growth of mold or other bacteria requires immediate attention to control damage. Natural cellulosic materials are the best environment for mold spores to grow and mature. "Mold is a microorganism that produces enzymes that convert the cellulose in fibers to soluble sugar that is metabolized as food. Proteins are generally less susceptible, but keratinophilic fungi will feed on, and damage, these fibers as well". Similar to wood found in nature, mold and other feeding organisms are attracted to the material, this includes pests and naturally occurring fungi and bacteria. Mold is a high risk for waterlogged wood even with controlled relative humidity and temperature due to the resilient nature of the organisms and the perfect environment waterlogged wood provides as a food source to the growth of spores.

=== Pests ===
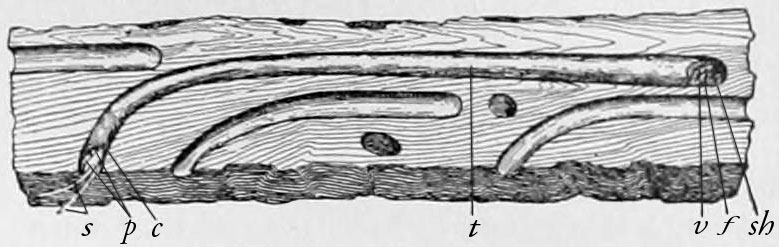
Diagram showing shipworm boring into a piece of wood.

Within maritime environments one of the largest pest threats to waterlogged wood includes shipworms (Teredinidae). Shipworms bore into wood that is immersed in seawater. Within a museum exhibit or storage environment and post treatment of waterlogged wood objects, there are a number of wood-boring pests that feast on wood. Two of which include the wood-boring/powderpost beetle and termites. Wood-boring beetles can include several different types within the board category. Each type of beetle could target a different type of wood. Evidence of pest deterioration includes powder-like frass near entry and exit holes within the wood. Termites also feast on and live below the surface of the wood so they can be more difficult to detect. Termites discharge six-sided fecal pellets and, if found on a wooden object, could be used to determine the type of pest damage

=== Physical ===
Physical deterioration of waterlogged wood can happen immediately through the evaporation of the water. If this happens rapidly, the cells in the wood can shrink and collapse. This damage might be inevitable depending on accessibility to treatment. Additionally waterlogged wood should never be handled extensively or put on exhibit for long periods of time. Most waterlogged wood is such that decayed wood cells in the material fill with water. Depending on the wood type and how long the wood has been in water, removal of the water from the cells too rapidly (in the form of natural drying or other) could apply major stress to the cell walls and cause them to collapse. Improperly dried waterlogged irreversibly shrinks, warps, cracks and there is risk of loss to the original surface.

== Preventative conservation ==
=== Environment and Storage ===
Waterlogged wood should be in the environment that it is found in (and kept wet) until a stable treatment proposal in conversation with a professional conservator is decided. To limit mold growth, waterlogged wood should be stored with proper relative humidity and temperature that does not encourage mold. Waterlogged wood will retain its structure as long as it is wet.

== Conservation treatment ==
The treatment of waterlogged wood should be undertaken by a professional conservator who understands how materials degrade and how the introduction of new materials might affect or at worst accelerate the degradation process. One of the largest issues with treatment on waterlogged wood is finding a way to remove the water in the wood but keep the water that is part of the material. Preventing cell wall collapse (which causes shrinking, cracking, and further damage) of the waterlogged wood while drying is the largest struggle and main goal of treatment. Some commonly used treatments include the polyethylene glycol (PEG) method, sucrose method, acetone-rosin method, alcohol-ether method, camphor-alcohol method, freeze drying, and silicone oil treatment, or various combinations.

=== Evaporation/displacement/replacement of heavily waterlogged wood ===
==== PEG treatment ====
The purpose of the polyethylene glycol is to remove water from the wood while simultaneously bulking the deteriorated wood cells. PEG is applied to the surface, either by spraying or immersing the object in a solution of PEG in water. Over the course of the treatment, PEG is slowly increased in concentration, pushing out the excess water, coating the interior walls of the wood cells with PEG, which, depending on the molecular weight selected, will provide support once the artifact is dried. PEG compounds with different molecular weights may be used depending on the wood type, level of deterioration, and scope of project.

The PEG treatment is often paired with vacuum freeze-drying, as the eutectic point of most PEG solutions is below the freezing point of water. This allows the "free" waterlogging water to sublimate in the process of freeze-drying, which minimizes damage to the wood by preventing ice from forming within the cells and expanding, causing more shrinking and warping. Some artifacts are too large to fit in a commercially available freeze-drier (see the treatment for Vasa or Mary Rose or the Bremen cog).

==== Sucrose treatment ====
Identical to PEG treatment process but sucrose is used instead of PEG solution. The water inside the cell walls of the wood is replaced by sucrose, rather than PEG. Originally recommended as a low-cost method for treating waterlogged wood, sucrose treatments are inconsistent in how much shrinkage they prevent, especially for severely degraded wood.

==== Acetone-rosin treatment ====
Acetone-rosin Treatment is sometimes used on dense wood that cannot be penetrated by PEG. This would include softwoods that are nonporous. The goal of this treatment is to replace cells of wood with natural rosin. Rosin is a natural resin that is produced within some woods, for example pines naturally produce resin and are classified as a softwood. As a volatile solvent treatment option, the impact on the health and safety on the workplace must be considered.

=== Dehydration ===
==== Alcohol-ether treatment ====
This treatment follows the similar treatment of the PEG solution but instead of replacing the cells with another solution, the cells are replaced with alcohol and when the alcohol evaporates the cell and overall object is dehydrated. As a volatile solvent treatment option, the impact on the health and safety on the workplace must be considered.

==== Camphor-alcohol treatment ====
Camphor treatment is similar to the alcohol-ether treatment but instead of a quick evaporation of the alcohol inside of the cells, the camphor alcohol slowly replaces cell walls with camphor which goes from a solid to a gas state over time, keeping walls of cells bulked. As a volatile solvent treatment option, the impact on the health and safety on the workplace must be considered.

=== Desalination ===
Treatment must also take into account the type of water the wood was found in. Waterlogged wood recovered from marine environments may contain high levels of salts, which must be removed from the waterlogged wood to prevent further damage on drying. This can be done by a desalination process. Desalination is often completed in bath changes using clean water. Sometimes disinfectants (fungicides or algaecides) are added to prevent the development of damaging organisms. However, the most commonly used and recommended because of its lesser toxicity is a mixture of boric acid and borax. The desalination process takes a long period of time and is necessary that the water is changed until the concentration of excreted of soluble salts reach its maximum.

== Notable projects ==
=== Alexandria Ship Project ===
In January 2016, a mid-18th century ship was discovered on the waterfront of Alexandria, Virginia. Conservation efforts include keeping the wood submerged and wet since the wooden frame was waterlogged. The conservation of this ship is ongoing. When the waterlogged wooden frame was originally removed from the archaeological site, the timber frames were stored in fresh water vats until June 2017. The framed structure was then packaged and sent to the Conservation Research Laboratory at Texas A&M University for conservation. Documentation and conservation included laser scanning, modeling, X-ray, and wood degradation analysis before the treatment using polyethylene glycol and vacuum freeze drying

=== Mary Rose ===
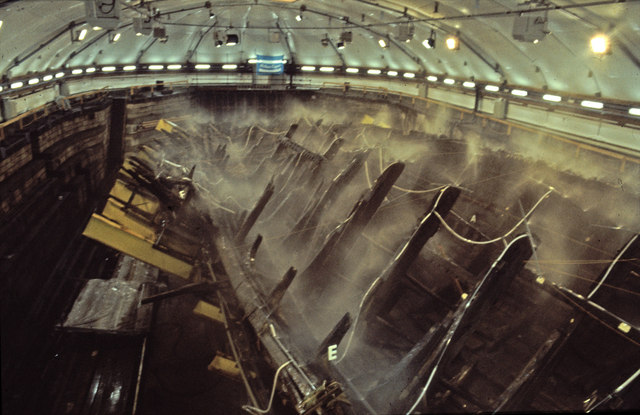
Mary Rose being sprayed with water in a Plymouth conservation facility, March 1984.

After finding the vessel Mary Rose objects and what was left of the ship were placed in a passive storage which slowed down the process of immediate deterioration removing the vessel from its extreme environment. In 1994, an elaborate three phased conservation treatment began on Mary Rose. From 1993 to 2003 was the first phase that consisted of the wood getting sprayed with low-molecular-weight PEG to replace the water in the cellular structure of the wood. The second phase from 2003 to 2010, raised the molecular-weight of the PEG solution with the purpose to strengthen the outer surface layers. The third phase in 2016, included controlled air drying.

=== Vasa ===
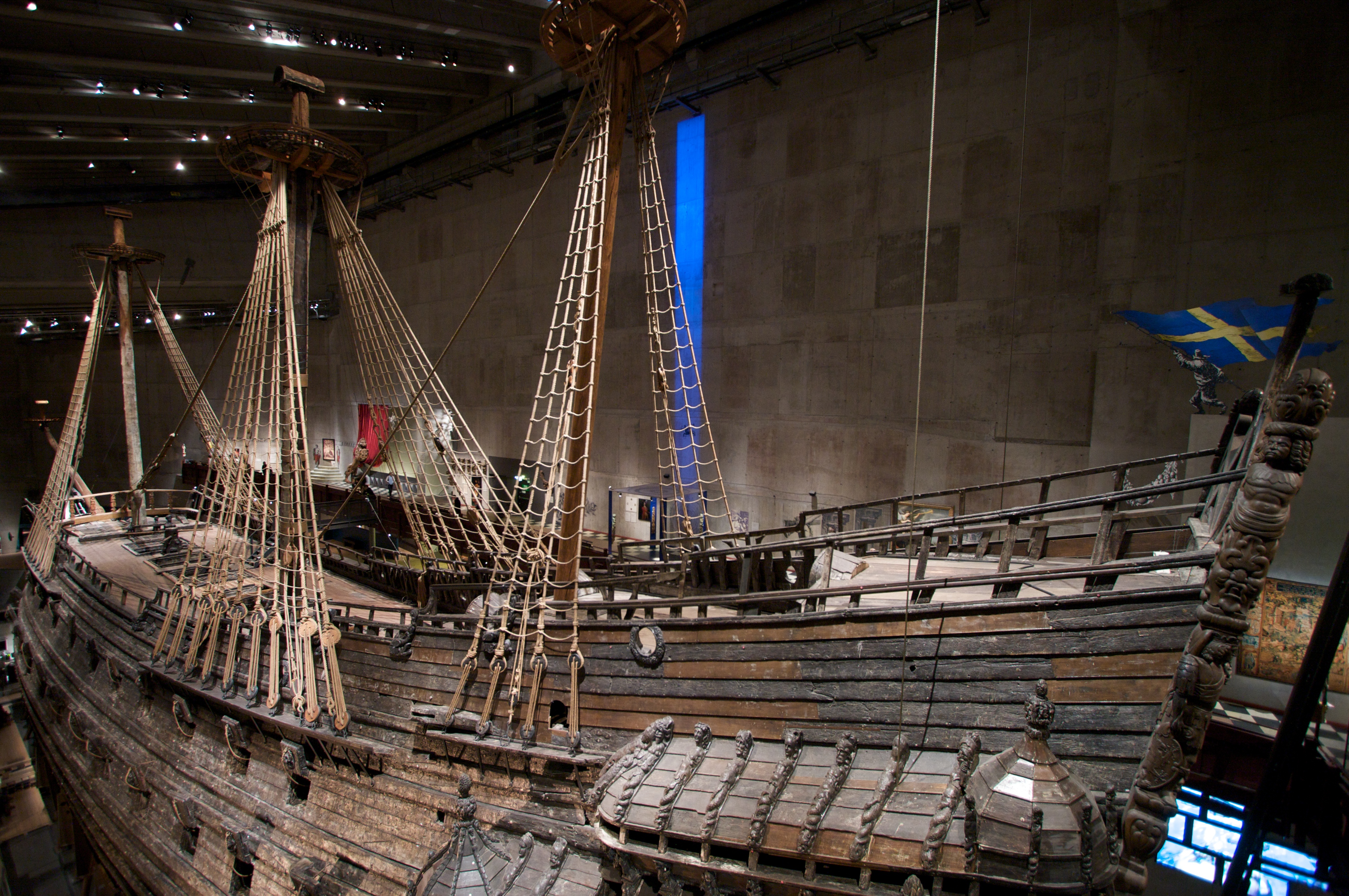
Vasa on exhibit, from the picture you can tell that a large majority of the ship was preserved.

The Vasa is a Swedish 1628 ship found archaeologically and was very well preserved. Completely submerged for 333 years allowed for the wood to be completely waterlogged but pollution in the 20th century off of the city Stockholm was able to kill any microorganisms that would have feast on the wreck, like the shipworm. Vasa was sprayed with a PEG solution for 17 years followed by a period of drying which is ongoing.

== Resources ==
- Wet Organic Archaeological Materials Working Group - International Council of Museum Committee for Conservation (ICOM-CC)
- National Park Service Waterlogged/Water damage wood Conserve O Gram
- Waterlogged Organic Artefacts - Guidelines on their Recovery, Analysis and Conservation - Historic England
- Conserving Waterlogged Wood - Maryland Archaeological Conservation Laboratory
- Mini-Symposium (DeYoung Museum) - Conservation of Pre-European Waterlogged Organic Artifacts and their Context in Aotearoa, New Zealand
- How to deal with waterlogged wood | The Mariner's Museum

== See also ==
- Wood preservation
