= Conservation science (cultural property) =

Interdisciplinary study

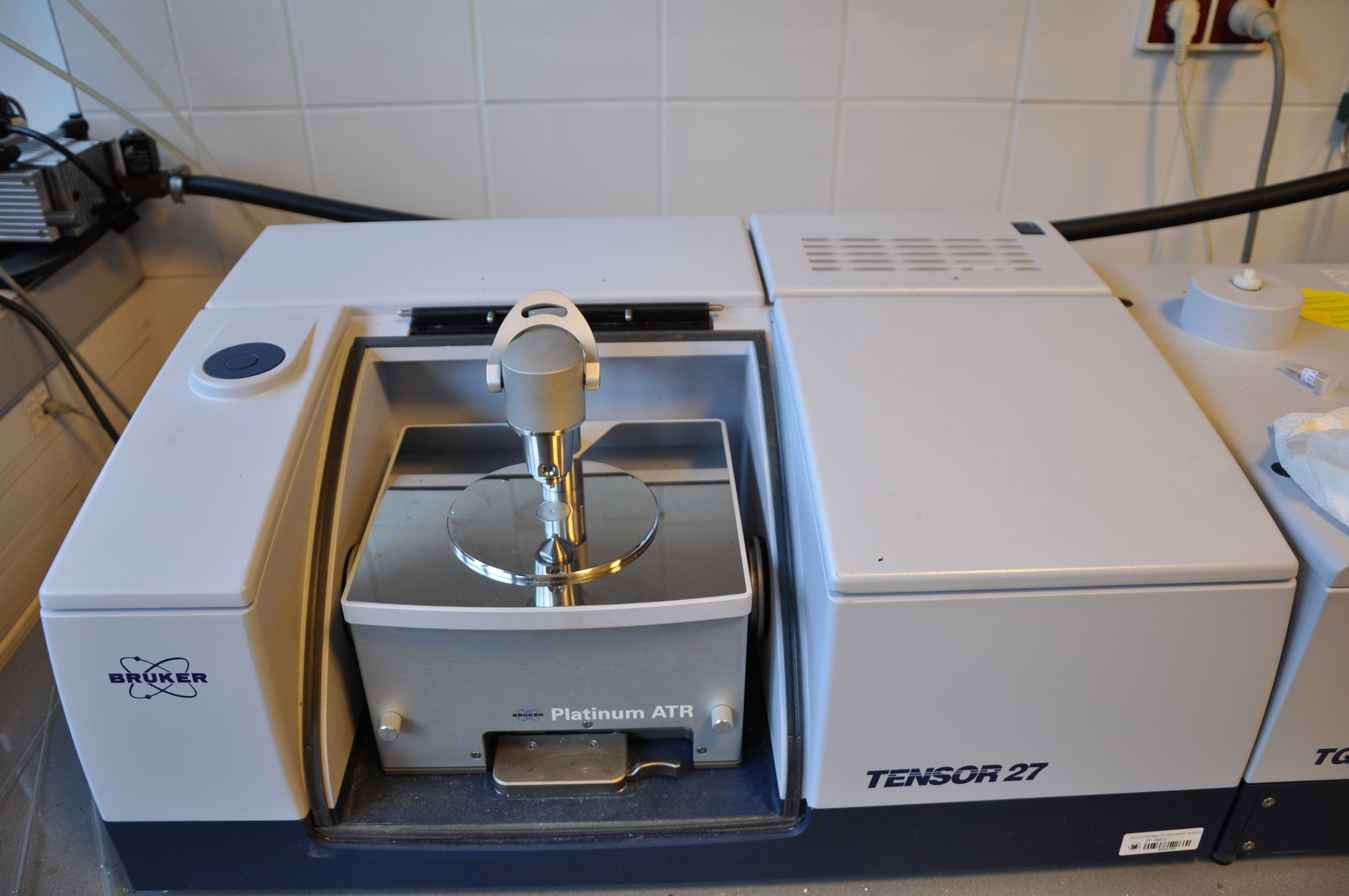
An infrared spectrometer, which can be used for the analysis of cultural heritage materials.

With respect to cultural property, conservation science is the interdisciplinary study of the conservation of art, architecture, technical art history and other cultural works through the use of scientific inquiry. General areas of research include the technology and structure of artistic and historic works. In other words, the materials and techniques from which cultural, artistic and historic objects are made. There are three broad categories of conservation science with respect to cultural heritage: understanding the materials and techniques used by artists, study of the causes of deterioration, and improving techniques and materials for examination and treatment. Conservation science includes aspects of materials science, chemistry, physics, biology, and engineering, as well as art history and anthropology. Institutions such as the Getty Conservation Institute specialize in publishing and disseminating information relating to both tools used for and outcomes of conservation science research, as well as recent discoveries in the field.

== Introduction ==
Prior to thorough scientific analysis, a detailed visual assessment of the object, heritage site, or artwork is necessary in addition to gathering all relevant historic and current documentation. Diagnosing the current state in a non-invasive way allows both conservators and conservation scientist to determine exactly what further analysis would be required and whether the subject of the study will be able to withstand more rigorous examination. Additionally, since the goal of conservation-restoration is to use minimal intervention for the purpose of preservation, this initial assessment falls in line with various codes of ethics which outline best practices for conservators and scientists. Many countries have their own codes of ethics for conservators, such as the following:

- American Institute for Conservation (AIC) Code of Ethics
- Canadian Association of Professional Conservators (CAPC) and the Canadian Association for Conservation of Cultural Property (CAC) Code of Ethics and Guidance for Practice

Along with assessing the current state and potential risk of future deterioration of artworks and objects, scientific study may be necessary to determine if there is risk to the conservators themselves. For example, some pigments used in paintings contain highly toxic elements such as arsenic or lead and could be hazardous to those working with them. Alternatively, previous restoration efforts may have involved chemicals that are now known to have dangerous side effects with prolonged exposure. In these cases, conservation science may reveal the nature of these hazards as well as present solutions for how to prevent current and future exposure.

== Material properties ==
Research into the chemical and physical properties intrinsic to the materials used to create cultural heritage objects is a large part of the study of conservation science. Materials science, in conjunction with the broader field of restoration and preservation, has resulted in what is now recognized as modern conservation. Using analytical techniques and tools, conservation scientists are able to determine what makes up a particular object or artwork. In turn, this knowledge informs how deterioration is likely to occur due to both environmental effects and the inherent traits of that given material. The necessary environment to maintain or prolong the current state of that material, and which treatments will have the least amount of reaction and impact on the materials of the objects being studied, are the primary goals of conservation research. Conservation treatments fall under four broad categories including cleaning, desalination, consolidation, and pest control. Knowledge of the material properties of cultural heritage and how they deteriorate over time helps conservators formulate actions to preserve and conserve cultural heritage.

In many countries, including the United Kingdom and Italy, conservation science is considered part of the broader field called 'Heritage Science' which also encompasses scientific aspects less directly related to cultural heritage conservation, as well its management and interpretation.

=== Paper ===
The majority of paper is made up of cellulose fibers. The deterioration of paper may be the result of pests such as vermin, insects, and microbes, or by theft, fire, and flood. More specifically, paper deteriorates from two mechanisms that alter its hue and weaken its fibers: acid-catalyzed hydrolysis and oxidation. Treatment for paper includes deacidification, bleaching and washing.

Safe environments for the storage and display of paper artifacts include having a relative humidity (RH) of below 65% and above 40% and an ideal temperature between 18 and 20 °C (64 and 68 °F).

=== Textiles ===
Textiles are woven fabrics or cloth that represent culture, material legacy of international trade, social history, agricultural development, artistic trends, and technological progress. There are four main material sources: animal, plant, mineral, and synthetic. Deterioration of textiles can be caused by exposure to ultraviolet (UV) or infrared light (IR), incorrect relative humidity and temperature, pests, pollutants, and physical forces such as fire and water. Textiles may be treated in a number of ways including vacuuming, wet cleaning, dry cleaning, steaming, and ironing. To preserve the integrity of textiles, storage and display environments result in as little light exposure as possible. Safe environments for textiles include those with a temperature of around 21 °C (70 °F) and relative humidity of 50%.

=== Leather ===
Leather is a manufactured product made from the skin of animals. Leather can deteriorate from red rot, excessive dryness resulting in cracking and breakage, fading from exposure to light, mold resulting in odors, stains, and distortion, and insects and dust, both of which can cause holes and abrasions. Corrosion can also occur when leather comes into contact with metals. There are two primary methods for leather conservation: application of dressings or treatments to prolong the life of the leather and improving the means by which leather is stored. The second method is a preventive approach while the first, an older method, is an interventive approach. Leather artifacts are best stored with relative humidity between 45% and 55% and a temperature of 18–20 °C (64–68 °F).

=== Glass and ceramics ===
Glass and ceramics can be maintained for much longer periods of time and are two of the most durable materials. The biggest risk to glass and ceramics is breakage, however improper display and storage can lead to stains and discoloration. Ceramics can become stained from inappropriate cleaning and repair while porous or cracked ceramics can develop stains from being soaked in water during cleaning. Increased temperatures can cause darkening of already existing stains and can lead to cracks. Glass can become damaged from 'weeping glass' wherein droplets of moisture form on glass surfaces. This can lead to a leaching out of unstable components that produce an alkaline solution. If allowed to remain on the glass for an extended period of time, this solution can produce fine cracks known as crizzling. Careful handling and storage is the surest means to preventing damage to glass and ceramics. The below table displays recommended storage conditions for damaged and unstable objects:

Weeping glass	Temperature and relative humidity	18–21 °C (64–70 °F), 40%
Crizzling glass	Temperature and relative humidity	18–21 °C (64–70 °F), 55%
Archaeological ceramics	Temperature and relative humidity	18–21 °C (64–70 °F), 45%

=== Metals ===
Metals are produced from ores that are found naturally in the environment. Most metal objects are made from a combination of individual metals called alloys and exhibit different strengths and colors based on their composition. Metals and alloys commonly found in cultural objects include gold, silver, copper, pewter, tin, and iron. The most common form of deterioration for metal is corrosion. Corrosion occurs when metals come into contact with water, acids, bases, salts, oils, polishes, pollutants and chemicals. Mechanical damage, breakage, dents, and scratches can occur from mishandling metal objects and result in damage to the metal object. Over polishing can lead to deterioration and potentially misidentification by removing plating, decoration, makers' marks, or engravings. Mechanical, electrical, and chemical interventions are often used in the treatment of metals. Appropriate storage of metal objects helps to increase their longevity; it is recommended that metal objects be stored in closed systems with well-sealed doors and drawers with relative humidity between 35 and 55%.

=== Plastics ===
Plastics experience degradation from several factors including light, ultraviolet radiation, oxygen, water, heat, and pollutants. There are no international standards for the storage of plastics so it is common for museums to employ similar methods to those used to preserve paper and other organic materials. A wide range of instruments and techniques can be used in the treatment of plastics including 3-D scanning and printing technologies as a means of reproducing broken or missing parts. Recommended relative humidity for plastics is 50% along with a temperature of 18–20 °C (64–68 °F).

=== Stone ===
Stone objects take on many forms including sculpture, architecture, ornamental decoration, or functional pieces. Deterioration of stone depends on several factors such as the type of stone, geographical or physical location, and maintenance. Stone is subject to a number of decay mechanisms that include environmental, mechanical, and applied decay. Erosion from air, water, and physical touch can wear away surface texture. Carved stone should not be regularly cleaned as cleaning can cause deterioration by opening its pores as well as removing surface features such as engravings, artists' tools, and historical marks. Dirt, moss, and lichen do not usually cause decay to stone but may add to its patina.

=== Wood ===
Wood is a biodegradable, organic material that is susceptible to deterioration from both living organisms and environmental factors. Some ancient wood is recognized for its archaeological value and falls into two categories: dry and waterlogged. The recommended temperature for storage and display of wooden artifacts is 21 °C (70 °F) during the winter months and 21–24 °C (70–75 °F) during the summer months. The recommended relative humidity for storage and display of wooden artifacts during the winter months is 35%–45% and 55%–65% during the summer months. Effective cleaning of wooden artifacts includes waxing, polishing, dusting, and buffing. For the maintenance of the wooden structure of the architectural heritage, fire-resistant coatings can be used to enhance the fire-resistant performance of the structure.

See also conservation and restoration of wooden artifacts.

=== Paintings ===
Painting materials include acrylic paint, oil paint, egg tempera, lacquer, water color, and gouache. Conservation techniques for paintings include dirt and varnish removal, consolidation, structural treatments, in-painting, in-filling, and retouching of losses. It is recommended that paintings be stored with other heritage and art collections.

See also conservation and restoration of paintings.

== Mechanisms of deterioration ==
Conservation science studies the process by which the various mechanisms of deterioration cause changes to material culture that affect their longevity for future generations. These mechanisms may produce chemical, physical, or biological changes and differ based on the material properties of the subject at hand. A large portion of conservation science research is the study of the behavior of different materials under a range of environmental conditions. One method used by scientists is to artificially age objects in order to study what conditions cause or mitigate deterioration. The results of these investigations informs the field on the major risk factors as well as the strategies to control and monitor environmental conditions to aid in long term preservation. Further, scientific inquiry has led to the development of more stable and long-term treatment methods and techniques for the types of damages that do occur.

=== Fire ===
Fire is caused by chemical reactions resulting in combustion. Organic material such as paper, textiles, and wood are especially susceptible to combustion. Inorganic material, while less susceptible, may still suffer damage if exposed to fire for any period of time. The materials used to extinguish fires, such as chemical retardants or water, can also result in further damage to material culture.

=== Water ===
Water primarily causes physical changes such as warping, stains, discoloration, and other weakening to both inorganic and organic materials. Water can come from natural sources such as flooding, mechanical/technological failures, or human error. Water damage to organic material may lead to the growth of other pests such as mold. In addition to the physical effects of water directly on an object or artwork, moisture in the air directly affects relative humidity which can in turn exacerbate deterioration and damage.

=== Light ===
Light causes cumulative and irreversible damage to light-sensitive objects. The energy from light interacts with objects at the molecular level and can lead to both physical and chemical damage such as fading, darkening, yellowing, embrittlement, and stiffening. Ultraviolet radiation and Infrared radiation, in addition to visible light, can be emitted from light sources and can also be damaging to material culture. Cultural institutions are tasked with finding the balance between needing light for patrons and guests and exposure to the collection. Any amount of light can be damaging to a variety of objects and artworks and the effects are cumulative and irreversible. Conservation science has helped establish 50 Lux as the benchmark level of light intensity that allows the human eye to operate within the full range the visible light spectrum. While this is a baseline for many museums, adjustments are often needed for based on specific situations. Conservation science has informed the industry on the levels of light sensitivity of common materials used in material culture and the length of time permissible before deterioration is likely to occur. Control strategies must be considered on an item by item basis. Light, ultraviolet, and thermometers for infrared radiation are some of the tools used to detect when levels fall outside of an acceptable range.

=== Lightning ===
Lightning strikes are the primary natural cause of damage to architectural heritage because ancient buildings generally use timber with high oil content, such as pine. Lightning strikes can cause the timber in the building to catch fire by the heat of the lightning arc. Lightning can also split wood and cause damage to the building structure. The lightning current will generate heat after passing through the timber and generate gas inside, and the impact force formed by the instantaneous expansion of the gas will knock the wood out of damage pits or cracks. Stone decorations on ancient buildings may also suffer physical damage from lightning.

=== Incorrect relative humidity ===
Relative humidity (RH) is the measure of the humidity, or the water vapor content, in relation to the atmosphere and ranges from damp to dry. Material properties determine the effect that different levels of RH can have on any particular item. Organic materials like wood, paper, and leather, as well as some inorganic material like metals are susceptible to damage from incorrect RH. Damage ranges from physical changes like cracking and warping of organic materials to chemical reactions like corrosion of metals. Temperature has a direct effect on relative humidity: as warm air cools, relative humidity increases and as cool air warms up, relative humidity falls. Dampness can cause the growth of mold which has its own damaging properties. Research in the field has determined the various ranges and fluctuations of incorrect humidity, the sensitivity of various objects to each one, and has helped establish guidelines for proper environmental conditions specific to the objects in question.

=== Incorrect temperature ===
Material properties directly determine the appropriate temperature needed to preserve that item. Incorrect temperatures, whether too high, too low, or fluctuating between the two, can cause varying levels of deterioration for objects. Temperatures that are too high can lead to chemical and physical damage such as embrittlement, cracking, fading, and disintegration. Too high temperatures can also promote biological reactions like mold growth. Temperatures that are too low can also result in physical damages such as embrittlement and cracking. Temperature fluctuations can cause materials to expand and contract rapidly which causes stress to build up within the material and eventual deterioration over time.

=== Pests ===
Pests include microorganisms, insects, and rodents and are able to disfigure, damage, and destroy material culture. Both organic material and inorganic material are highly susceptible. Damage can occur from pests consuming, burrowing into, and excreting on material. The presence of pests can be the result of other deterioration mechanisms such as incorrect temperature, incorrect relative humidity, and the presence of water. Fumigation and pesticides may also be damaging to certain materials and requires careful consideration. Conservation science has aided in the development of thermal control methods to eradicate pests.

=== Pollutants ===
Pollutants consist of a wide range of compounds that can have detrimental chemical reactions with objects. Pollutants can be gases, aerosols, liquids, or solids and are able to reach objects from transference from other objects, dissipation in the air, or intrinsically as part of the object's makeup. They all have the potential to cause adverse reactions with material culture. Conservation science aids in identifying both material and pollutant properties and the types of reactions that will occur. Reactions range from discoloration and stains, to acidification and structural weakening. Dust is one of the most common airborne pollutants and its presence can attract pests as well as alter the object's surface. Research in the field informs conservators on how to properly manage damage that occurs as well as means to monitor and control pollutant levels.

=== Physical forces ===
Physical forces are any interaction with an object that changes its current state of motion. Physical forces can cause a range of damage from small cracks and fissures to complete destruction or disintegration of material. The level of damage is dependent on the brittleness or hardness of the object's material and the magnitude of the force being inflicted. Impact, shock, vibration, pressure, and abrasion are a few examples of physical forces that can have adverse effects on material culture. Physical forces can occur from natural disasters like earthquakes, working forces like handling, cumulative forces like gravity, or low-level forces like building vibrations. During an object's risk assessment, the material properties of the object will inform the necessary steps (i.e. building, housing, and handling) that need to take place to mitigate the effects of physical forces.

=== Theft and vandalism ===
Theft, the removal of an asset, and vandalism, the deliberate destruction or disfigurement of an asset, are directly controlled and limited by the security measures put in place at a cultural institution. Conservation science can aid in the authentication or identification of stolen objects. In addition, the research of the field can help inform decisions as to the best course of action repair, minimize, or mitigate damage from vandalism.

=== Dissociation ===
Dissociation is the loss of an object, its associated data, or its value due to outside influence. Adherence to proper policies and procedures is the best defense against dissociation and as such, meticulous record keeping is the basis for all good practice. Conservation science aids in the authentication or identification of misplaced objects and detailed records of all past, present, and future study is necessary for the prevention of dissociation.

== Methods ==
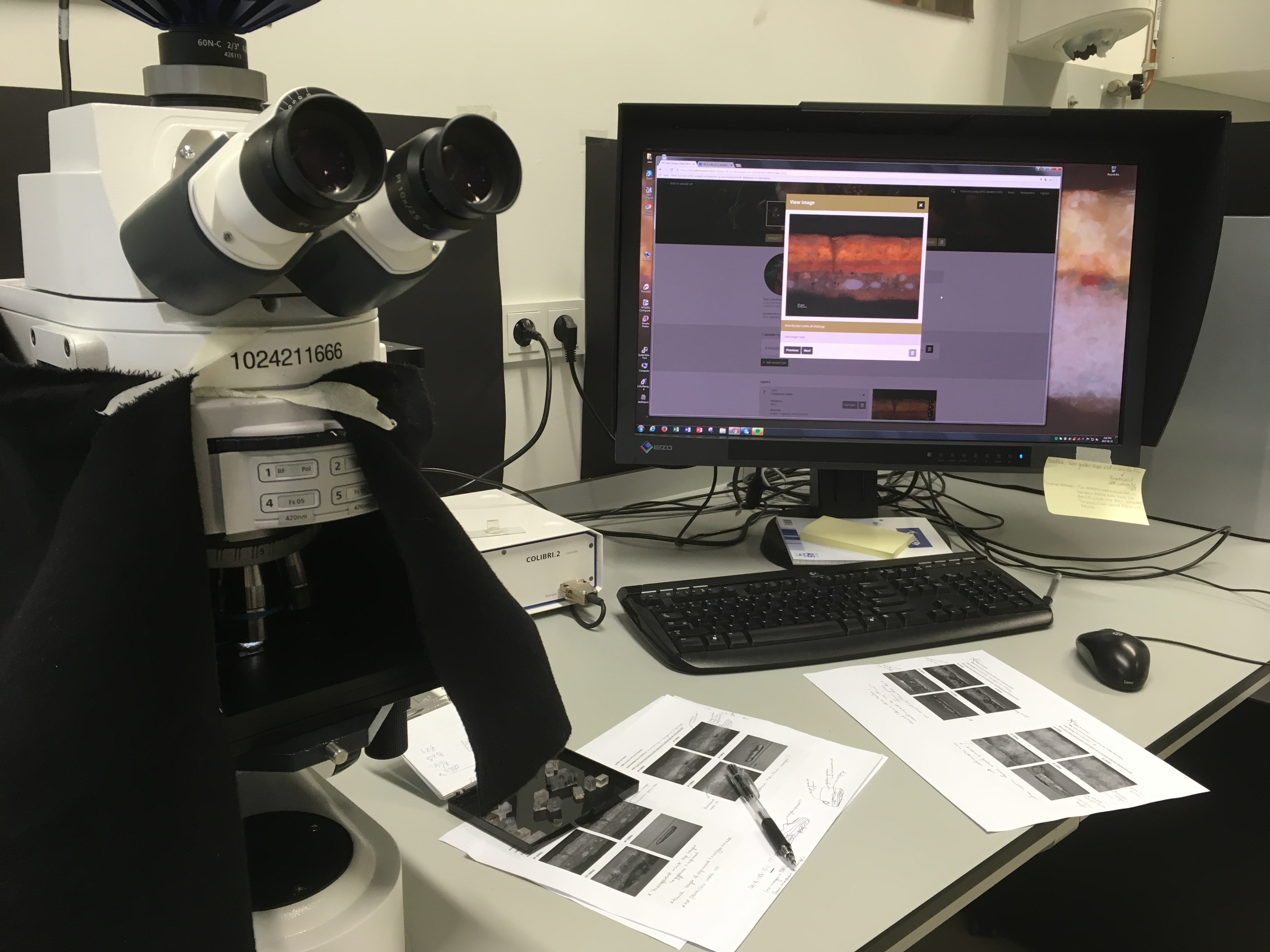
Optical microscope used to visually study very small paint fragments (mounted in epoxy) as a means of identifying paints used by artists.

There are a variety of methods used by conservation scientists to support work in the fields of art conservation, architectural conservation, cultural heritage, and care of cultural objects in museums and other collections. In addition to the use of specialized equipment, visual inspections are often the first step in order to look for obvious signs of damage, decay, infilling, etc.

Prior to any type of scientific analysis, detailed documentation of the initial state of the object and justification for all proposed examinations is required to avoid unnecessary or potentially damaging study and keep the amount of handling to a minimum. Processes such as stereomicroscopy can reveal surface features such as the weave of parchment paper, whether a print was done in relief or in intaglio, and even what kind of tools an artist may have used to create their works. While there are many different specialized and generic tools used for conservation science studies, some of the most common are listed below.

=== Scientific equipment ===
- Scanning Electron Microscopy (SEM)
  - Able to take high resolution and high magnification micrographs to study structural and surface features
  - Also may involve using Energy Dispersive X-Ray Spectroscopy (EDS) to identify specific elements or compounds present in the object
  - Electron Backscatter Diffraction (EBSD) can provide better contrast within the microscope in order to better visualize different phases, materials, and compounds present to identify composition
  - Can help to determine paint composition (specific type of paint used) in art works and compounds that may aid in provenance queries
  - Allows scientists to analyze whether the object's appearance merits preservation or if there are products of deterioration and decay that ought to be removed or cleaned prior to preservation
  - Destructive/invasive method – requires obtaining a sample from an object or artwork and exposing it to X-Ray radiation
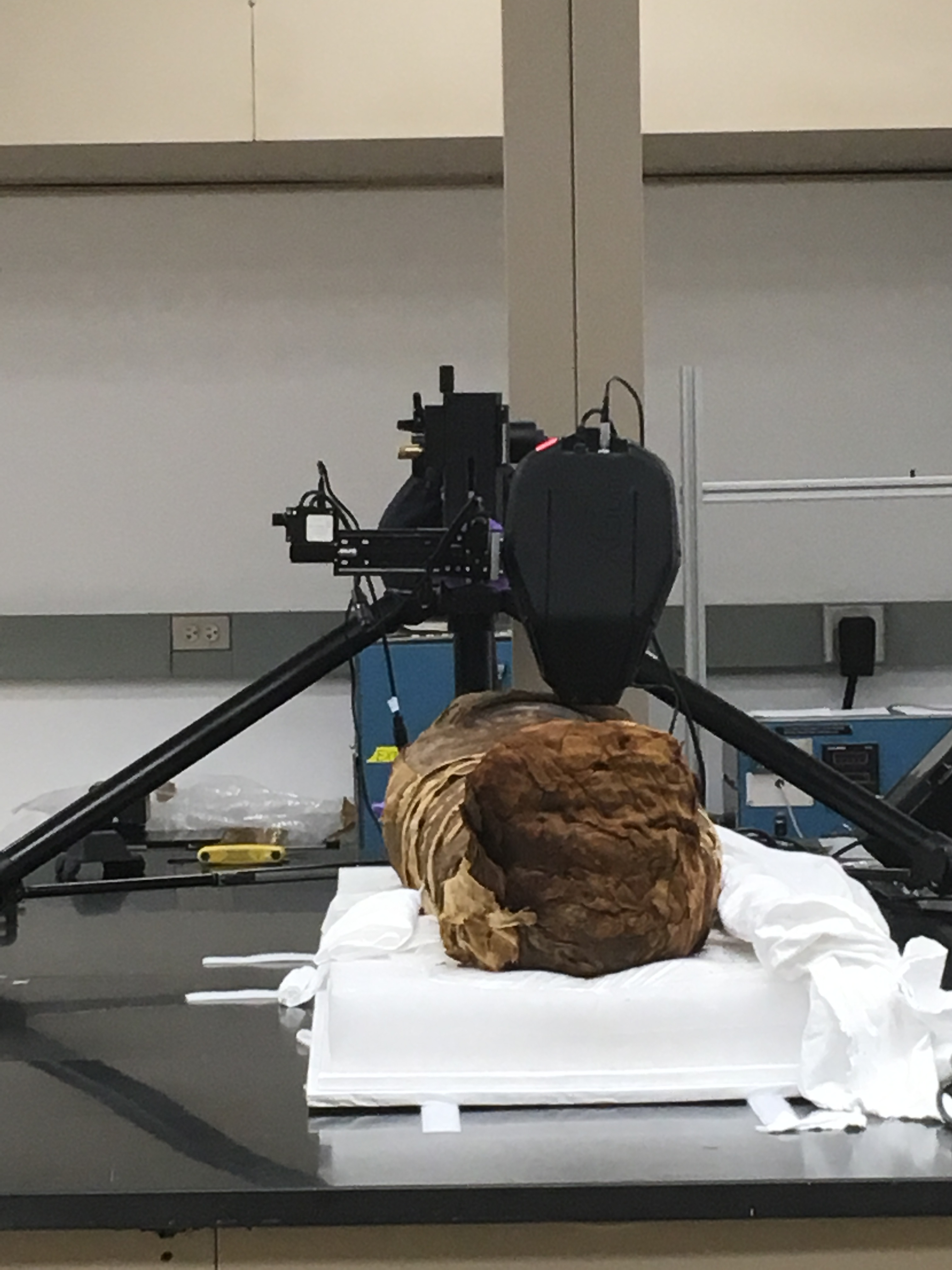
- X-ray fluorescence spectroscopy (XRF) of the wooden, painted portrait of a Roman portrait mummy. The portable tool is hooked up to a rig that allows it to pan left and right, up and down, so as to scan the entire surface of the portrait. The height can also be manually adjusted to ensure focus is maintained. This technique provides information on the paints used which aids in provenance and compositional studies.
  X-Ray Fluorescence Spectroscopy (XRF)
  - Can identify elements both on the surface and sub-surface by performing x-ray scans over the entirety of an artwork
  - Non-destructive/non-invasive method - scans of the object's surface do not require sampling or removal of material
- Computerized Tomography Scanning (CT Scan) and Magnetic Resonance Imaging (MRI)
  - Non-destructive way to image larger objects
  - Can reveal sub-surface structure as well as some composition information
  - Particularly useful for imaging artifacts such as mummified remains to aid in identification and understanding of burial practices
  - When combined with "computational surface flattening" CT can be used to analyze and read rolled, folded or sealed documents without disturbing the artifacts' condition.
- Reflectance Transformation Imaging (RTI)
  - Method of surface imaging whereby the location of the light source can be changed to image so an object or artwork is illuminated from a variety of directions
  - Non-invasive method that yields surface topography and texture to analyze surface features
- Fourier Transform Infrared Spectroscopy (FTIR)
  - Method for identifying materials in works of art based on the fact that each compound or element has a specific combination of atoms, each of which will have a unique peak in the resultant spectra
  - Non-invasive and non-destructive method for chemical analysis that requires very small quantities of sample from inconspicuous locations on artworks and objects
  - Most common IR technique used to obtain spectral information through the constructive and destructive interference of electromagnetic waves using an interferometer
  - Known for their excellent speed, sensitivity, and resolution, better light-gathering power than dispersive instruments, and wavelength precision and accuracy

The type of material present will be the deciding factor in what method will be appropriate for study. For example, organic materials are likely to be destroyed if exposed to too much radiation, a concern when doing X-ray and electron-based imaging. Conservation scientists may specialize with specific materials and work closely with conservators and curators in order to determine appropriate analysis and treatment methods.

== See also ==
- Conservation scientist
