= Francesca Casadio =

American-Italian scientist

Francesca Casadio is an American-Italian conservation scientist and Founding Director of the Scientific Research Laboratory at the Art Institute of Chicago. In 2006 she was awarded the L’Oréal Art and Science of Colour Silver Prize.

== Early life and education ==
Casadio grew up in Turin, and attended Liceo Classico Massimo d'Azeglio. She has said that she was always interested in art and cultural heritage. She studied chemistry at the University of Milan. Her Master's research developed vibrational spectroscopies (Raman spectroscopy and FTIR) to understand pigments used in polychrome art. Her doctoral research used chemical analysis to understand the polymers used to conserve art and architecture. She spent 1995 as an Erasmus scholar at Imperial College London. After earning her doctorate she moved to Rome, where she worked on conservation science and diagnostic spectroscopies. She worked at the Getty Conservation Institute and the Los Angeles County Museum of Art.

== Research and career ==
In 2003, Casadio founded the Scientific Research Laboratory at the Art Institute of Chicago. Her research studies the materials and techniques of artists and public engagement with museum objects. She is interested with the development of non-destructive and non-invasive characterisation techniques.

Casadio founded the Northwestern University Art Institute of Chicago Center for Scientific Studies in the Arts, where she focussed on the analysis of Renoir and Picasso artworks. In 2006 Casadio was honoured with the L’Oréal Art and Science of Colour Silver Prize.

She was awarded an Honorary Doctorate from the Sorbonne University in 2019.

In June 2026 Francesca Casadio was appointed Director of the Getty Conservation Institute. The institute utilizes scientific research, education, and projects to preserve and advance cultural heritage.
