= Conservation scientist =

Person who studies the conservation of cultural heritage

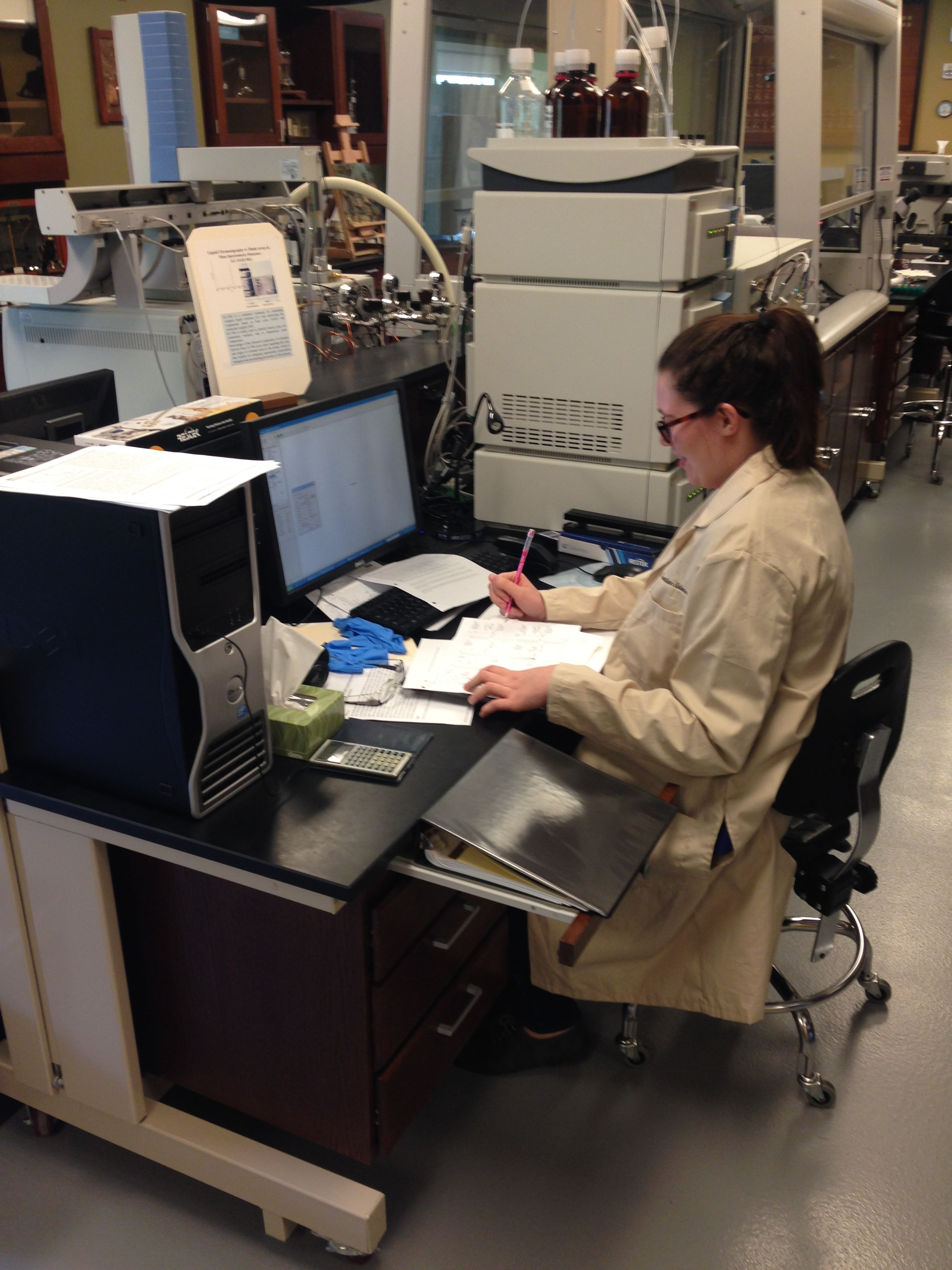
Conservation scientist using a liquid chromatograph-mass spectrometer at the Indianapolis Museum of Art.

A conservation scientist is a museum professional who works in the field of conservation science and whose focus is on the research of cultural heritage (e.g. art, artifacts, buildings, and monuments) through scientific inquiry. Conservation scientists conduct applied scientific research and techniques to determine the material, chemical, and technical aspects of cultural heritage. The technical information conservation scientists gather is then used by conservator and curators to decide the most suitable conservation treatments for the examined object and/or adds to our knowledge about the object by providing answers about the material composition, fabrication, authenticity, and previous restoration treatments.

== Responsibilities and duties ==
The main responsibility of a conservation scientist is to provide analytical and technical support for the preservation and restoration of cultural objects using scientific analysis and techniques. These tasks are accomplished primarily in four ways: 1.) the identification of materials and fabrication of an object, 2.) studying the degradation mechanisms of the objects, 3.) developing and testing conservation-restoration treatments, and 4.) developing and testing new analytical techniques and equipment. Each task is properly documented by conservation scientists with such information as composition, condition, history, and suggested treatments. Additionally, many of these tasks require conservation scientists to collaborate with other museum professionals and industrial/mainstream scientists in order to properly accomplish them, in particular with conservators and curators.

=== Identification ===
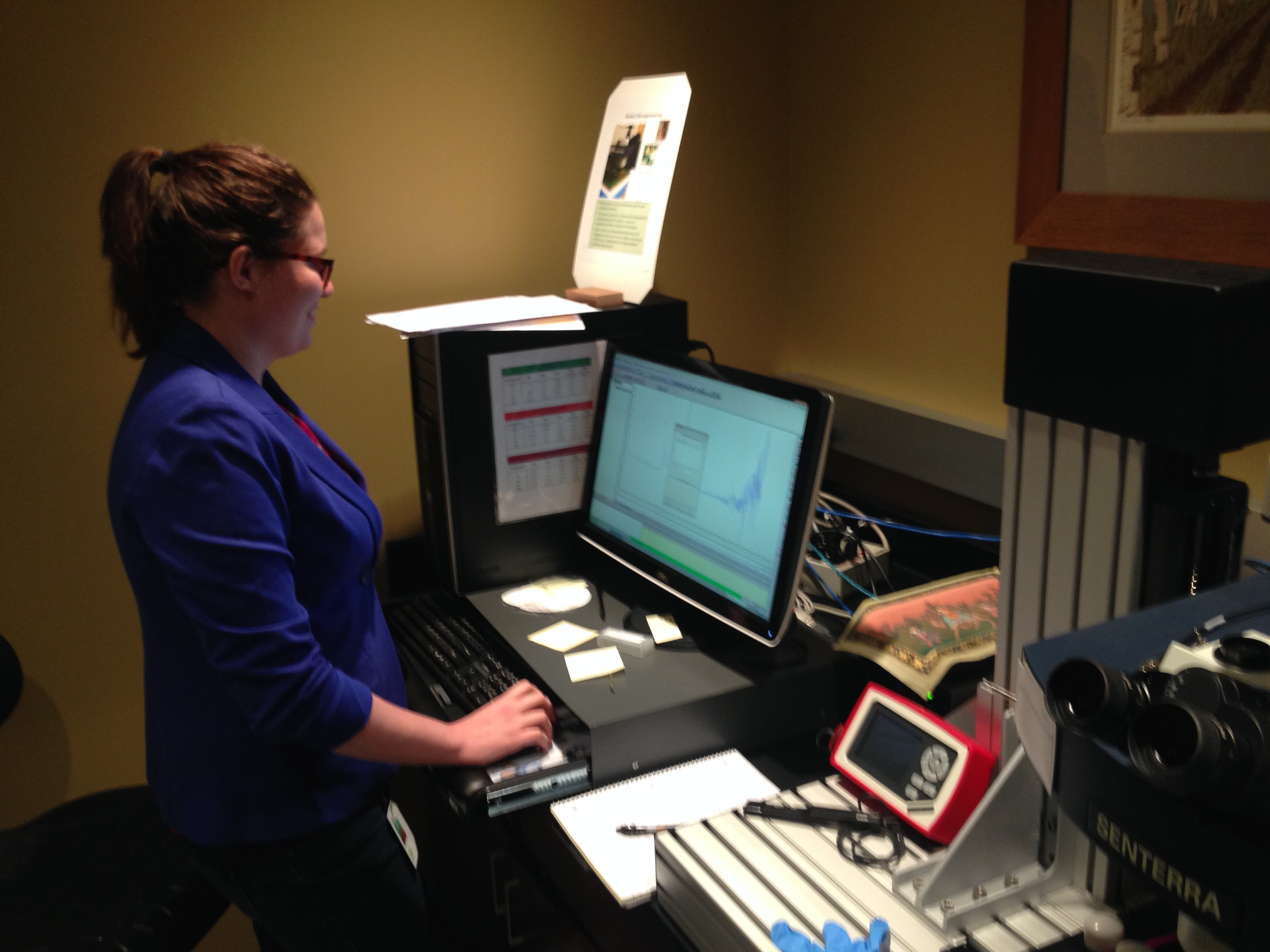
Conservation scientist using Raman spectroscopy at the Indianapolis Museum of Art.

The identification of an object’s component materials is the most basic of conservation science tasks. This is typically accomplished using non-destructive examination techniques or, if necessary, destructive analytical techniques designed for small samples (see Instruments and uses). The information yielded about the object’s material composition aids in the development of preventive conservation measures- such as lighting and humidity controls-and the selection of appropriate restoration treatments. The analysis of materials can also lead to discoveries about the object’s origin and fabrication. Such studies, called technical art history, can provide insight into the time period of an object, its authenticity, the artist, and previous restoration treatments. In addition to leading to new interpretations, this information impacts the selection of treatments by conservators and conservation scientists.

=== Degradation ===
Another key focus of conservation science is studying the degradation or deterioration mechanism of objects. Using chemical analysis, conservation scientists can determine the underlying material processes (i.e. aging and chemical reactions), risk factors, and environmental conditions causing the objects to degrade. This information can then be used by conservation scientists, in collaboration with conservators, to develop appropriate treatments for objects, in particular treatments that can provide long-term stability and preservation for the examined object.

=== Development of conservation-restoration treatments ===
The continuing development of new conservation materials (e.g. cleaning solvents) and techniques is an essential aspect of the conservation of cultural heritage. This research ensures the continued existence of cultural heritage in the best condition possible considering their age and degradation. Conservators often rely on conservation scientists for their scientific knowledge and skills in the development of these materials and treatments. Conservation scientists are asked to evaluate the effectiveness and safety of current materials and treatments, to improve those material/techniques, and to devise new materials and techniques. The goal is to develop conservation treatments and materials that can slow the degradation of materials and further damage effectively and without harming the object.

=== Development of new analytical techniques and equipment ===
In addition to developing conservation treatments and materials, conservation scientists collaborate with industrial scientists and instrument manufactures in the development of new analytical techniques and equipment. Conservation scientists are constantly looking for and developing new techniques and instruments that improve the condition and treatment of objects. To this end, scientists are developing new techniques and instruments to: decrease and eliminate the need for sampling objects to minimize collateral damage, better analyze materials, document results, improve ease (e.g. portability), improve environmental monitoring.

=== Education ===
In addition to their scientific responsibilities, conservation scientists have a duty to help educate new conservations scientists, the conservation field, and the public as part of their ethical code. To ensure the continuation and quality of their profession, conservation scientists are involved in the training of new conservation scientists as members in academic conservation departments, adjunct faculty, and as mentors to those in fellowships, internships, and entry-level jobs. Conservation scientists also help educate the conservation community at large by disseminating their research to promote the growth and use of the best conservation practices and materials. Lastly, conservation scientists educate the public about conservation science to promote awareness of about the field and its importance to the preservation of our cultural heritage.

== Knowledge, abilities, and skills ==
The basic knowledge, skills, and abilities needed by conservation scientists are:

- advance knowledge in a physical or applied science discipline (e.g. physics, chemistry, material science, biology, engineering, and geology)
- basic knowledge of conservation and relevant humanities disciplines (e.g. art history, archaeology, anthropology, history, fine arts, etc.)
- critical thinking and creative problem solving
- the ability to formulate and carry out research
- experience using a broad range of analytical techniques and equipment (see Instrumentation and uses)
- the ability to collaborate and work in a team
- the ability to communicate effectively

== Instrumentation and uses ==
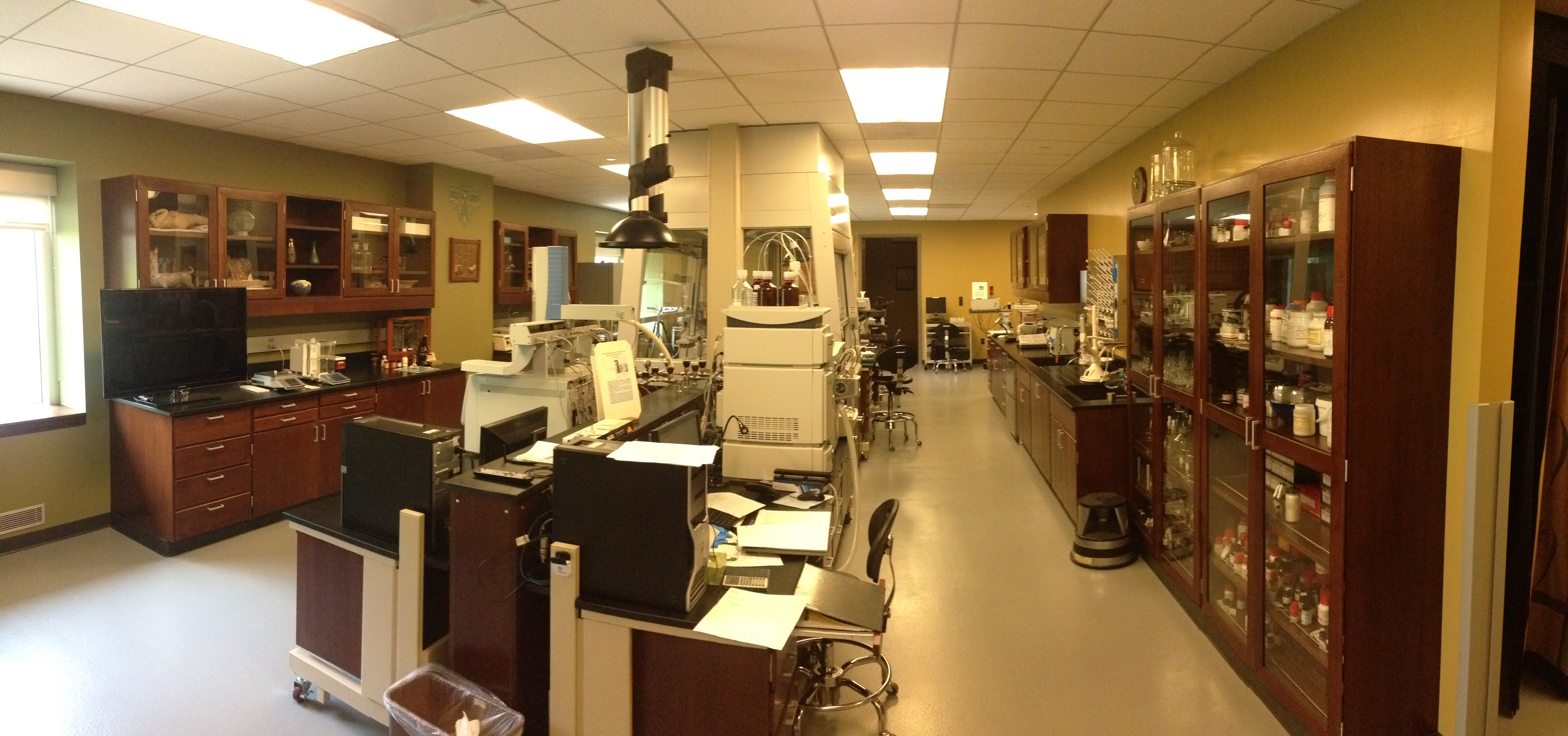
Indianapolis Museum of Art Conservation Science Laboratory.

Conservation scientists use a variety of microscopic, spectroscopic, chromatographic, and other scientific techniques and instruments to physically and chemically examine objects. Non-destructive techniques are favored by conservation scientists so to preserve the originality, integrity, and current state of the object as much as possible. Such non-destructive methods include visual examination, advanced imaging techniques, and X-rays. Sometimes, sampling an object is unavoidable. In these cases, microscopic fragments are removed from the object- rarely visible to the naked eye- and their original location is documented. The scientific and ethical demands of a conservation scientist require a variety of instruments- taken from mainstream science and slightly modified- in order to conduct their research properly. Listed below are some of the most commonly used instruments in museum laboratories today and how they are used by conservation scientists.

Microscopic:

- Fourier transform infrared microspectroscopy (FTIR): Uses the infrared spectrum (IR) to identify the functional groups or covalent bonding information of an object. In conservation science, it is an important technique for the identification of materials, in particular for classifying organic materials. Microscopic samples can provide information on the chemistry of the various materials which comprise the object.
- Raman microspectroscopy: Uses vibrational spectroscopy methods to identify certain materials. In conservation science, it is used to identify and characterize materials of objects such as amber, glass, glazed ceramics, pigments, and polymers.
- Scanning Electron Microscopy with Energy Dispersive Spectroscopy (SEM-EDS): Uses an electronic beam to scan the surface of a sample, producing detailed images at a high magnification/resolution. In conservation science, it is used to study the surface of an object and identify the materials present.

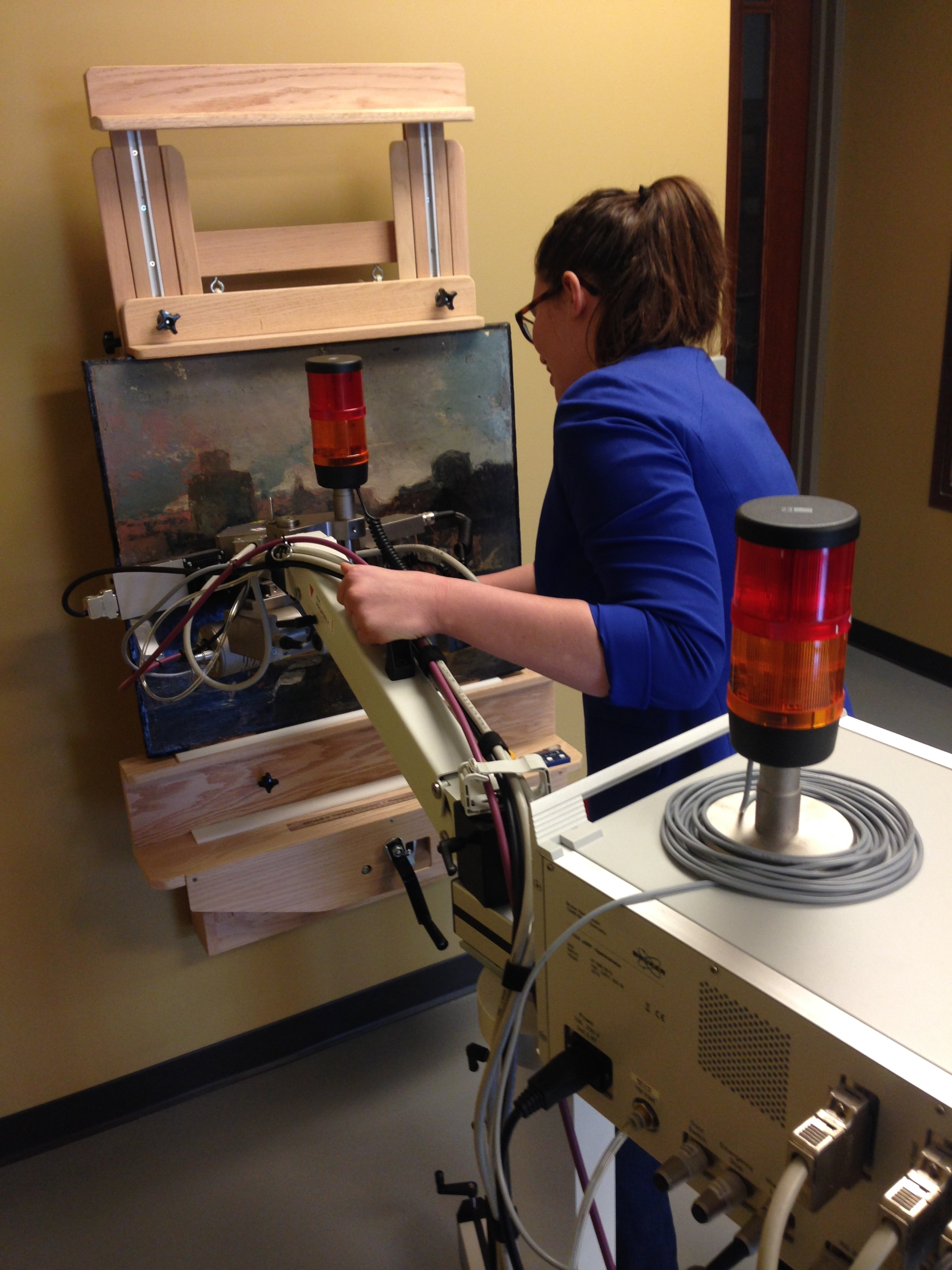
Caitlyn Phipps using micro X-ray fluorescence (XRF) Spectroscopy at the Indianapolis Museum of Art

Spectrometric:

- X-ray fluorescence (XRF) Spectroscopy: Uses an X-ray beam on the surface of an object which produces a characteristic fluorescence X-ray of the elements present. A non-destructive technique, it is used in conservation science to identify the elemental and chemical content of the materials present in the examined area.
- Chromatography: A set of laboratory techniques used to separate mixtures of compounds. Several of the techniques are extremely adept in the positive identification of organic materials.
  - Liquid chromatography–mass spectrometry (LC-MS) Combines liquid chromatography (which uses liquid "to separate complex mixtures of organic materials into their individual chemical components") and mass spectrometry. The combination provides a detailed identification of the components in the examined material.
  - Gas chromatography-mass spectrometry (GC-MS): Combines gas chromatography (which uses gas "to separate complex mixtures of organic materials into their individual chemical components") and mass spectrometry. The combination provides a detailed identification of the components in an object at the low parts per billion level.
  - Pyrolysis-gas chromatography-mass spectrometry (Py-GC-MS): Combines gas chromatography and mass spectrometry on a heated sample. The heat decomposes the sample, producing smaller molecules to be separated by the gas chromatography and detected by the mass spectrometry. The technical is useful in the identification of synthetic polymeric media.

Others:

- X-Radiography: An imaging technique that uses high energy radiation (X-rays) to view the internal structure of an object's component materials that differ in densities. The technique is used in conservation science to examine the structural makeup of objects and identify cracks, manufacturing clues, etc. that are not visible to the naked eye.
- Microfadeometry (MFT): Measures the light sensitivity of an object. In conservation science, it is used to study the deterioration rate of colors when exposed to light and oxygen.

== Education and training ==
There is much discussion and debate in the field of conservation science about the amount and type of education and training that should be required for people entering the field. Currently, there is no one set path to becoming a conservation scientist. A 2013 survey conducted by the International Center for the Study of Preservation and Restoration of Cultural Property (ICCROM) on the education and training paths for conservation scientists worldwide concluded that:

the largest categories of recommend qualifications are the combinations BA+MA (24%) in conservation and BSc+MA in Conservation (23%). The majority, 87%, thinks you need both science and conservation qualifications. 44% of the respondents thing you should have 0-2 years of working experience, and 41% think you need 3 years or more.

This survey demonstrates that there is no worldwide consensus on the type and amount of education and training needed to become a conservation scientist, resulting in regional and institutional variations.

In the United States, the most common route taken is an advanced degree in a physical, natural, or applied science discipline such as physics, chemistry, material science, biology, engineering, and geology. Master’s degrees are acceptable, but most conservation scientists have their PhD. In fact, a doctoral degree is becoming an increasingly common requirement for even entry-level conservation science positions. A basic knowledge of conservation theory and practice, art history, and/or other relevant humanities disciplines (e.g. archaeology, anthropology, fine arts, history, etc.) is also essential. Scientists seeking to enter the field typically gain this experience and knowledge through postdoctoral fellowships. There are several postdoctoral programs in particular for scientists to receive specialized training in conservation science, including those at the National Gallery of Art (the Charles Culpepper Fellowships), Harvard University Art Museum, and the Getty Conservation Institute. Numerous museums and cultural institutions also have individual advanced training fellowships in conservation science through such organizations as the Kress Foundation and the Andrew W. Mellon Foundation. The Northwestern University-Art Institute of Chicago Center for Scientific Studies (NU-ACCESS) is one example of an Andrew W. Mellon funded fellowship.

In Europe, there are two common routes taken to become a conservation scientist. The first path is a postgraduate course in conservation science that includes training, research, and practice/experience with practicing conservators-restorers. The European PhD in Science for Conservation (EPISCON), which is a three-year fellowship program at ten participating institutions, is an example of such a program. The second pathway is on the job training on a conservation science team combined with continuous professional development.

== Professional organizations ==
As a unique mixture of academic disciplines, conservation scientists may join an assortment of professional organizations to suit their varied needs and specializations. These organizations may include those dedicated solely to conservation science, conservation, or a related science field. Many of the general conservation and related science organizations, in fact, have specialized groups for conservation science. The American Ceramic Society, for example, has an Art, Archaeology, and Conservation Science division devoted to advancing the scientific study of ceramics and their preservation.

The following list is by no means comprehensive for possible organizations as there are numerous regional, national, and international associations for each category.

=== Conservation science organizations ===
- Associazione Nazionale degli Esperti di Diagnostica e di Scienze e Tecnologie applicate ai Beni Culturali (ANEDbc)

=== Conservation and preservation organizations ===
- International
  - International Centre for the Study of the Preservation and Restoration of Cultural Property (ICCROM)- Materials and technology
  - International Institute for Conservation of Historic and Artistic Works (IIC)
  - International Council of Museums- Committee for Conservation (ICOM-CC)- Scientific Research
  - The Institute of Conservation (ICON)- Science Group
- Australia
  - Australian Institute for the Conservation of Cultural Material Inc.- Conservation Science Special Interest Group
- Canada
  - Canadian Association for Conservation of Cultural Property (CAC)
  - Canadian Association of Professional Conservators (CAPC)
  - Canadian Conservation Institute (CCI)
- United States
  - American Institute for Conservation (AIC): Research and Technical Studies

=== Scientific organizations ===
- Eastern Analytical Symposium (EAS)
- Infrared & Raman Users Group (IRUG)
- Society for Applied Spectroscopy (SAS)
- American Chemical Society (ACS)
- Materials Research Society (MRS)
- American Society for Testing and Materials (ASTM) International
- Royal Society of Chemistry (RSC)

== Notable individuals ==
- Alan Burroughs (1897 – 1965): Fogg Art Museum scientist who used X-rays and X-radiography to study art, especially old master paintings; his studies were the impetus for more collaborations between curators and conservators and scientists
- Michael Faraday (1791 – 1867): Involved in the development of science in museums and galleries in Britain with analytical and deterioration studies for the National Gallery in London
- Robert L. Feller (1919 – 2018): A pioneer conservation scientist; he was the first scientific technical advisor to the National Gallery of Art (1950), tested and introduced Acryloid B-72 to the field, and contributed heavily to our knowledge about natural and synthetic picture varnish, color, the damaging effects of light exposure, and polymer and paper degradation
- Rutherford John Gettens (1900 – 1974): A pioneer in conservation science; he was the first chemist in the United States to be permanently employed by an art museum (Fogg Art Museum) and a founding member of the International Institute for Conservation of Historic and Artistic Works (ICC)
- William Andrew Oddy (born 1942): Created the Oddy test, which determines the safety of materials to art objects
- Harold Plenderleith (1898 – 1997): A pioneer in conservation science in the United Kingdom; he was one of the first scientists (chemist) hired by the British Museum, authored The Conservation of Antiquities and Works of Art: Treatment Repair, and Restoration (1956), and became the first director of ICCROM
- Alexander Scott (1853–1947): A pioneer in conservation science in the United Kingdom; he was the first scientist (chemist) hired at the British Museum
- Francesca Casadio: American-Italian conservation scientist and Founding Director of the Scientific Research Laboratory at the Art Institute of Chicago.

== Related positions ==
Due to the nature of their job and positions in museums, conservation scientists are also sometimes referred to as "scientists", "museum scientists", "art scientists", or "cultural heritage scientists". They are generally located organizationally in the conservation or science department of cultural institutions; although, some museums do have departments solely dedicated to conservation science (e.g. Kunsthistorisches Museum).

Conservation scientists also collaborate with a variety of museum professionals and industrial scientists -who may specialize in heritage science - in order to accomplish all of their responsibilities and duties. Due to the similar nature of their duties, they most frequently work with conservators (i.e. conservator-restorer and object conservator) and curators to complete technical studies on the objects in their museum’s collection to determine the materials used, the artists' techniques, the authenticity of the work, and previous conservation treatments. These three professions also collaborate to determine conservation treatment goals and the ideal environmental conditions (preventive conservation) for the objects. Exhibition designers, architects, and collection managers also consult with conservation scientists to ensure that environmental conditions are suitable for the objects while either in storage or on display.

Industrial scientists are also consulted by conservation scientists about object materials and chemical studies. The two groups of scientists, along with instrument manufactures, also collaborate "to develop and adapt new non-invasive analytical techniques."

== See also ==
- Conservation science
- Conservation-restoration
- Collection (museum)
- Collections care
- Conservator-restorer
- Cultural conservation
- Curator
- Heritage Science
- List of dates in the history of conservation and restoration
- Object conservation
