= Aggelos Katsaggelos =

Electrical engineer and academic

Aggelos K. Katsaggelos
- Άγγελος Κ. Κατσάγγελος
- Education: Aristotle University of Thessaloniki; Georgia Institute of Technology
- Known for: Iterative image restoration; image and video processing; computational imaging
- Awards: IEEE Fellow (1998); IEEE Signal Processing Society Technical Achievement Award (2010); Fellow of EURASIP (2017); Fellow of Optica (2018)
- Scientific career
- Fields: Electrical engineering, signal processing, image processing, video processing, computational imaging
- Workplaces: Northwestern University
- Website: ivpl.northwestern.edu

Aggelos K. Katsaggelos (Greek: Άγγελος Κ. Κατσάγγελος) is a Greek electrical engineer and academic whose research has focused on image and video processing, multimedia signal processing, computational imaging, computer vision, and machine learning. He is the Joseph Cummings Professor of Electrical and Computer Engineering at Northwestern University, where he has courtesy appointments in computer science and radiology and directs the Image and Video Processing Lab. He was elected a Fellow of the Institute of Electrical and Electronics Engineers in 1998 for contributions to the theory and application of iterative image restoration methods, received the IEEE Signal Processing Society Technical Achievement Award in 2010 for contributions to image and video processing, and has been elected a Fellow of EURASIP and Optica.

== Education and career ==
Katsaggelos received a diploma degree in electrical and mechanical engineering from the Aristotle University of Thessaloniki in 1979, and M.S. and Ph.D. degrees in electrical engineering from the Georgia Institute of Technology in 1981 and 1985, respectively. He joined Northwestern University in 1985.

At Northwestern, Katsaggelos is the Joseph Cummings Professor of Electrical and Computer Engineering and has courtesy appointments in computer science and radiology. His Northwestern profile lists him as director of the Image and Video Processing Lab, co-director of the Center for Scientific Studies in the Arts, and deputy director of computation at the Center for Computational Imaging and Signal Analytics in Medicine.

Katsaggelos has also held editorial and service roles in the IEEE Signal Processing Society. The society's Leo L. Beranek Meritorious Service Award list records that he received the 2001 award for service to the society, including service as editor-in-chief of IEEE Signal Processing Magazine.

== Research and applications ==
Katsaggelos's research areas include image and video processing, multimedia signal processing and communications, computational imaging, computer vision, machine learning, and medical and biological signal processing. His IEEE Fellow citation recognized his work on iterative image restoration methods, and the IEEE Signal Processing Society Technical Achievement Award cited his contributions to image and video processing.

In cultural heritage imaging, Katsaggelos worked on computational methods for analyzing and colorizing historical images of artworks. MIT Technology Review en español described image-processing work by Northwestern researchers that used information from earlier versions of Henri Matisse's Bathers by a River and from the painting itself to help colorize a 1913 black-and-white photograph of the unfinished painting. In a Britannica video transcript about the same project, Art Institute of Chicago curator Stephanie D'Alessandro said the museum came to work with Katsaggelos because he could help visualize how the painting would have appeared at the time of the archival photograph.

His computational imaging work has also been reported in connection with studies of works by Pablo Picasso. In 2018, the Greek newspaper To Vima reported that Katsaggelos contributed computational methods used to reconstruct missing pixels in X-ray fluorescence data to improve imaging of artwork beneath Picasso's La Miséreuse accroupie.

In medical imaging, Katsaggelos was a senior author of DeepCOVID-XR, an artificial intelligence system studied for detecting COVID-19 on chest radiographs. CBS Chicago described Katsaggelos and Ramsey Wehbe as leading a Northwestern team that trained and tested DeepCOVID-XR on 17,000 X-rays. ERT News, Greece's public broadcaster, also covered the project and described Katsaggelos as the artificial-intelligence specialist heading the research team. CIDRAP News, MedCity News, and Fierce Biotech reported on the system's use of machine learning to screen chest X-rays and quoted Katsaggelos on its intended use as a rapid screening aid rather than a replacement for diagnostic testing.

Katsaggelos has also been involved in artificial-intelligence research in astronomy. In 2025, The Daily Northwestern described him as deputy director of the NSF–Simons AI Institute for the Sky and reported that he was involved in SkAI projects using machine learning in astronomy, including work on galaxy distortion and latent-space methods.

== Honors and awards ==
- Fellow of the Institute of Electrical and Electronics Engineers, elected in 1998 for contributions to the theory and application of iterative image restoration methods.
- IEEE Signal Processing Society Leo L. Beranek Meritorious Service Award, 2001.
- IEEE Signal Processing Society Technical Achievement Award, 2010, for contributions to image and video processing.
- Fellow of the European Association for Signal Processing, elected in 2017 for contributions to image and video processing.
- Fellow of Optica, elected in 2018 for broad and enduring contributions to digital image and video processing.
