= Microfadeometry =

Microfadeometry, also more popularly known as Microfading or MFT, is a technique that uses tiny spots of intense light to probe and measure color changes in objects of art that are particularly sensitive to light exposure. This process is completed using a recently designed instrument known as a microfading tester, or MFT. The data from the test is represented by reflectance spectra.

== History ==
Light-fastness testing dates back to as early as 1733. In the late 19th century with early art conservation studies, Russell and Abney published Action of Light on Watercolors in 1888 sparking a concern with light and the aging of cultural materials. Microfading, as a technique, was first identified in Paul Whitmore's lab book entry on September 21, 1994. His work on the topic was later published in 1999.

== Application ==
Before the creation of this technique, recording light-stability information directly from the objects was nearly impossible. Through the use of microfading technology, it is now possible to obtain both information about the chemical characterization of the dyes and the associated kinetics of color change. Benchtop microfaders and microfading testers are used to test and analyze light damage on cultural objects and potential light damage to objects in museum collections.

== Theory ==
Using a powerful xenon arc lamp, 1 lumen of light is focused through an optical fiber onto a 300–400 μm spot of the object's surface. The reflected light is collected by a second fiber optic. The period of exposure is monitored with a probe that transforms the reflectance spectrum into color coordinates in real-time. A typical microfading test is achieved in less than 10 minutes and replicates exposures equivalent to 5–12 years of display at normal museum light levels. The output of the xenon arc lamp is kept at constant by an exposure controller while it is filtered to 400–710 nm using a water filter. The spectrum is then used to quantify the amount of time it would take for the color change to result in a noticeable difference. This information is used to retrofit display conditions and improve the protection of vulnerable objects. Calibration of the instrument is achieved by using internal standards such as the Blue Wool Scale.

== Reliability ==
Concerns associated with microfading techniques include diffusion-limited photo-oxidation reaction rates, dehydration and heating of the sample, the variability of using and measuring ISO Blue Wool Standards, variation in spectral power distribution between lamps used in object display, and the lamp used in accelerated light aging, the small sampling area, the required number of sample the length of fading time and the potential interaction of individual chemical components of the object tested.

== Institutional Use ==
Cultural institutions that house their own instruments for microfadeometry include the Library of Congress and the National Gallery of Art in Washington DC, the Museum of Modern Art in New York, the Canadian Conservation Institute in Ottawa, the Los Angeles County Museum of Art, the Art Conservation Department at Buffalo State College in New York, The National Archives (United Kingdom), the Scottish National Gallery (United Kingdom), Qatar National Library (Qatar), French National Centre for Scientific Research in Paris, Philadelphia Museum of Art in the US, University of Gothenburg in Sweden, National Museum of Art, Architecture and Design in Norway, Kunstmuseum Basel in Switzerland, United States Holocaust Memorial Museum, National Library of Norway, National Taiwan Museum of Fine Arts, State Academy of Fine Arts Stuttgart in Germany, and other institutions.
