= Conservation and restoration of wooden artifacts =

Preservation of heritage collections

The conservation and restoration of wooden artifacts refers to the preservation of art and artifacts made of wood. Conservation and restoration in regards to cultural heritage is completed by a conservator-restorer.

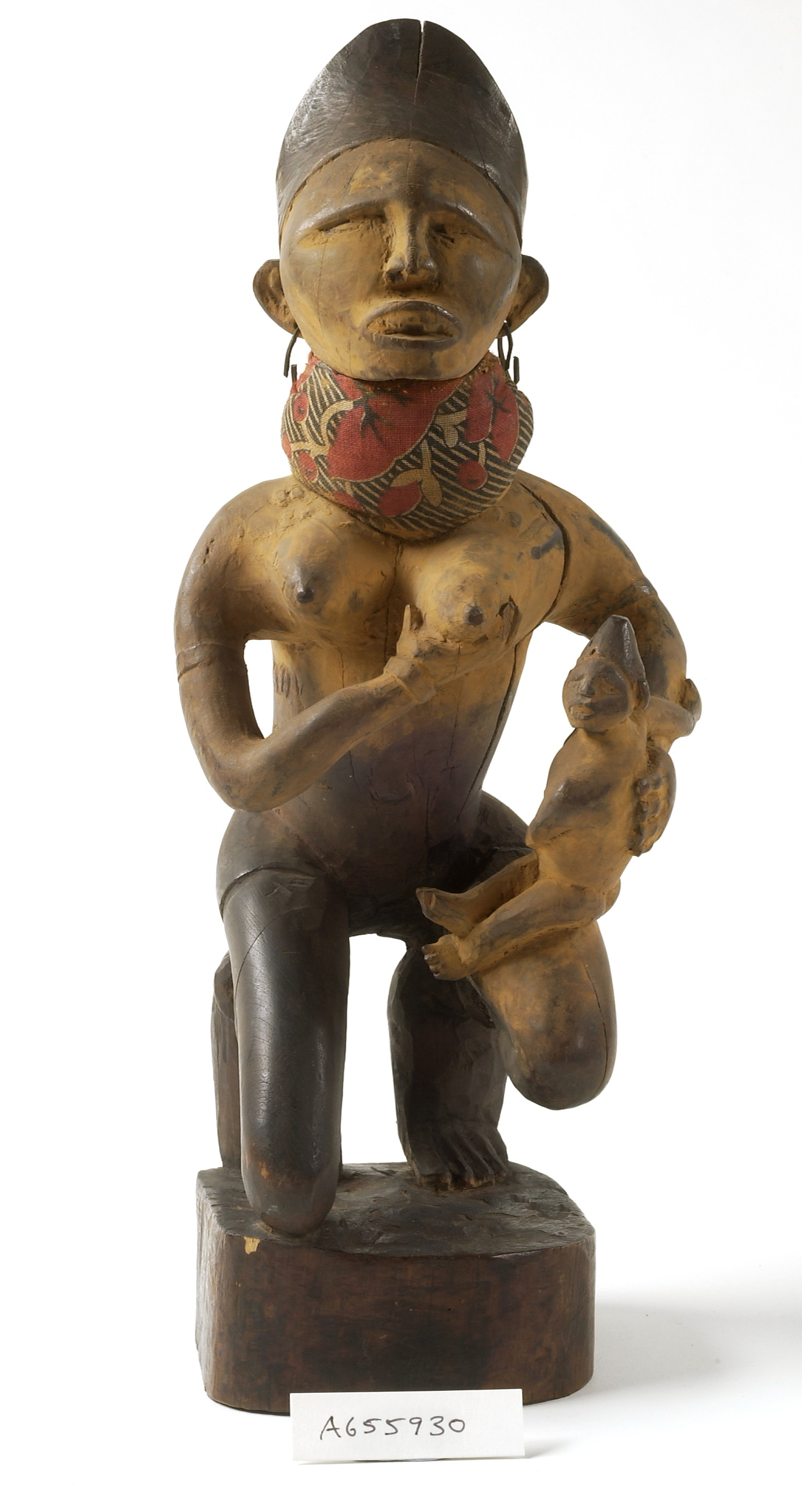
Carved wooden figure; Woman with child Wellcome L0036701

See also Conservation and restoration of wooden furniture

== Nature of the material ==
Wood is a vascular material that comes from the trunk, roots, or stems of over 3,000 varieties of plants. It is a cellular tissue and therefore can be understood by looking into the biological structure.

=== Cell structure ===
Wood is porous and its growth is directional. This is due to the cellular structure of the material. Cellular structure determines factors such as grain, texture, and color. Identification of wood types is undertaken by a conservation scientist.

==== Grain ====
Wood grain is created by the variations in number and arrangement of cells. It specifically refers to the longitudinal alignment of cells, or the direction in which the fibers are going. The six types of grain are: straight, irregular, diagonal, spiral, interlocked, and wavy. The directional of the grain directly corresponds with the strength of the wood.

==== Texture ====
Texture is dependent on the dimensions of the vessels that make up the wood. Large vessels result in coarse wood, while small vessels result in a fine texture.

==== Color ====
Color is determined by the infiltrates in the cell walls of the wood. Infiltrates can be affected by light, air, and heat which cause chemical reactions within the cell wall. These chemical reactions are what give the wood its color or what led to a change in the wood's color.

== Structure of wooden artifacts ==
=== Joinery ===
Joinery refers to any way that two separate components are put together. Joinery in regards to wood can take the form of any of the following:

- Widening joints
- Angle joints
- Framing joints – join two pieces of wood at a right angle
  - Dovetailing
  - Mortise and tenon
- Edge Joints – join two pieces of wood along the long edges of the board
  - Glue
  - Tongue and Groove
- Spline Joints-Lengthen wooden boards
- Mitre and dowel joint
- Hardware

See Woodworking joints

The success of joinery depends on the join chosen, the grain direction of joined parts, the amount of stresses imposed, wood movement in regards to moisture, and the surface quality of joins. If any one of these factors is compromised then the join is not as strong as it could be.

=== Surfaces ===
Wooden objects are often coated a surface protection or ornamentation. The following are common examples of surface treatments for wooden artifacts:

- Inlay
- Paint
- Varnish
- Gilding
- Lacquer

== Agents of deterioration ==
=== Humidity ===
Cracks due to damage from humidity

Humidity influences the deterioration of wooden artifacts through due to too much moisture in the air, too little moisture in the air, or rapid fluctuations in moisture. Because of the composition of wood, careful control of humidity is a factor in preventive conservation. If the relative humidity is too low the wood will release some of its moisture into the air and dry out. Conversely, if the relative humidity is too high, the wood absorbs water from the air and expands. Rapid fluctuations in humidity can lead to warping, loosening of joints, and splitting. High levels of moisture in the air also create an environment that encourages biological deterioration.

=== Weathering ===
Weathering related to the damage of objects caused by the exposure to wind, rain, sunshine, snow, or any other natural occurrence. These natural phenomenon erode away at the surface of the wood, causing damage to surfaces and structure.

=== Chemical agents ===
Chemical deterioration is caused by any agent that creates a chemical reaction within the cellular structure of the wood. The five common chemical agents that damage wood are:

- Light – Creates a chemical reaction within the cell walls of wood, leading to a change in color or texture
- Acids – Cause wood to become brittle.
- Alkalies – Cause the fibers of the wood to separate and break down.
- Salts – Similar to alkalies, salts break down the fibers of wood.
- Fire – Wood is a flammable material that burns easily in most cases when exposed to fire.

=== Biological agents ===
Characteristic checking due to wood rot - fungal attack

Biological deterioration in regards to wooden artifacts is caused by mainly by Insects and Fungi eating away at the surface of the material, which can lead to further problems if left untreated.

==== Insects ====
Insects damage wooden artifacts by feeding on the organic material, leaving waste behind, or tunneling into the wood. Insect damage can be controlled by understanding their life cycle and needs. Because they rely on environment to regulate their body temperatures, insects will slow down activity the colder the temperature is and will not breed or develop if temperatures are under 50 degrees Fahrenheit, or 10 degrees Celsius. Aside from requiring high temperatures, insects also thrive on environments with high levels of relative humidity. Wooden artifacts can provide just the right environment for insects to feed, tunnel, breed, and reproduce, leading to a variety of damages to the wood, including, boring holes, waste material, chew marks, and exit holes.

==== Fungi ====
Fungi cause damage to wooden artifacts by eating away at the wood and causing it to rot. Growth occurs on wooden artifacts when the environment is damp due to high levels of humidity and poor ventilation.

==== Other pests ====
- Birds – Mainly, woodpeckers, will cause damage to wooden objects left outdoors
- Marine Organisms – Can be problematic for artifacts that have recently been recovered from a maritime environment.
- Rodents – Will gnaw at the surface of wooden objects to obtain food. This is mainly a problem for objects that were once storage vessels.

== Preventive conservation ==
Preventive conservation is a form of collections care that acts to prevent damage to artifacts. This type of conservation can be undertaken by any person who is trained as a collection manager, registrar, art handler, or conservator.

=== Environmental control ===
One of the most basic forms of preventive conservation is through environmental control, which includes the regulation of temperature, humidity, and light. Through environmental control, most forms of deterioration to wooden artifacts can be prevented relatively easily.

==== Temperature ====
Temperature affects wooden objects through its correlation with humidity. Generally lower temperatures increase the amount of moisture in the air, while higher temperatures decrease the amount of moisture in the air. As such, recommended temperature for storage and display of wooden artifacts is 70 °F (21 °C) during the winter months and 70–75 °F (21–24 °C) during the summer months.

==== Humidity ====
Recommended relative humidity for storage and display of wooden artifacts during the winter months is 35–45% and 55–65% during the summer months. Any percentage above 70 can lead to fungi or insect infestations. Careful control of relative humidity can reduce the risk of damage caused by loss or absorption of water. Equipment that can help in the regulation of humidity is air conditioning, a humidifier or dehumidifier depending on needs, or by implementing RH buffers.

==== Light ====
Light can cause cumulative damage to wooden artifacts, leading to discoloration of the surface. Long exposure to light can result in darkening of light woods and bleaching of dark woods. Infra red radiation and heat from light can also damage any finishes to the object, causing cracking of paint or varnish, brittleness, or softening of the surface.

To reduce the damage inflicted by light, it is recommended that the three following steps be taken:

- Eliminate UV radiation – This can be done simply by keeping objects out of direct sunlight and displaying them behind UV filtering plexiglas.
- Reduce the amount of time the object is exposed to light – Most cultural institutions limit the amount of time a light sensitive object is on display by rotating it in and out of the galleries. Light exposure can also be controlled by having motion activated lights with timers, so objects are only illuminated when visitors are present and then only for a short amount of time.
- Keep light at minimal light levels comfortable for viewing-When an object is illuminated for viewers, it should be lit at the minimum level for comfortable viewing.

=== Cleaning ===
With wooden artifacts exposed to open air, it is important to remove particulates from the object's surface on a regular basis. The buildup of particulates can result in biological deterioration, encourage the growth of micro-organisms, and impair the qualities of an object's surface. Regular cleaning can reduce the long-term damage caused by the build-up of particulates. The most basic and effective method for regular cleaning of wooden artifacts is to dust off the surface with a dry cotton cloth.

=== Storage ===
Wooden artifacts should be kept out of direct sunlight and in a space where they will not get bumped or jostled around.

=== Pest eradication ===
Treatment for ridding wooden artifacts of insects usually involves a combination of the following techniques:

- Insecticidal treatment – Insecticides can be placed directly on areas of an object, or be used to treat large areas within the space where the objects are housed
- Temperature-based treatment – Since insects need specific temperatures to thrive, placing objects in a freezer that is -25 to -30 degrees Celsius for three days will kill off any remaining insects. Alternatively, placing objects in a space that is heated to 50 degrees Celius for an hour will also kill all stages of insect growth.
- Low oxygen atmostpheres-Keeping wooden artifacts in an air-tight space filled with nitrogen or argon for a 21-day period will end the insect life cycle and can be used as an alternative to pesticides.

== Object treatment ==
=== Surface cleaning ===
Surface cleaning refers to the removal of particulates from the surface of an object. To clean the surface of wooden artifacts, conservators generally use a soft brush or a vacuum cleaner with a soft brush. If wet surface cleaning is necessary, a dilute detergent can be applied with the use of a cotton swab or soft cotton cloth.

=== Drying ===
If a wooden artifact has sustained water damage, then the object must be dried slowly so as not to cause splitting of the wood as it dries. Similar to relative humidity, a rapid fluctuation in moisture from water damage can cause further damage to wooden objects. Slow controlled drying can be achieved by lower the relative humidity and creating a tent for the artifact so that it does not lose moisture too quickly.

=== Consolidation ===
If a wooden object has been damaged by insects or fungi, one treatment method is to consolidate the damaged fibers using a liquid resin or solvent to strengthen the material. This method can lead to visual changes in the object and is not always reversible.

Consolidation can also refer to the treatment of painted wood surfaces. Because of the complicated nature of wood as a material, consolidation of paint on a wooden artifact must be carefully undertaken. As wood expands and contracts with fluctuations in temperature and humidity, damages can occur to paint on the wood's surface.

=== Structural repair ===
Structural repair to wooden artifacts, as with the conservation of any artifact, should be as unobtrusive as possible. One method for mending separated pieces of wooden artifacts is the use of hot or liquid hide glue. To reverse warping of wooden artifacts, conservators often treat artifacts using pressure. Treatment methods can be broken down into three categories: Direct Woodworking, Indirect Woodworking, and Moisture-Related Methods.
