= Holger Militz =

German professor and wood scientist (born 1960)

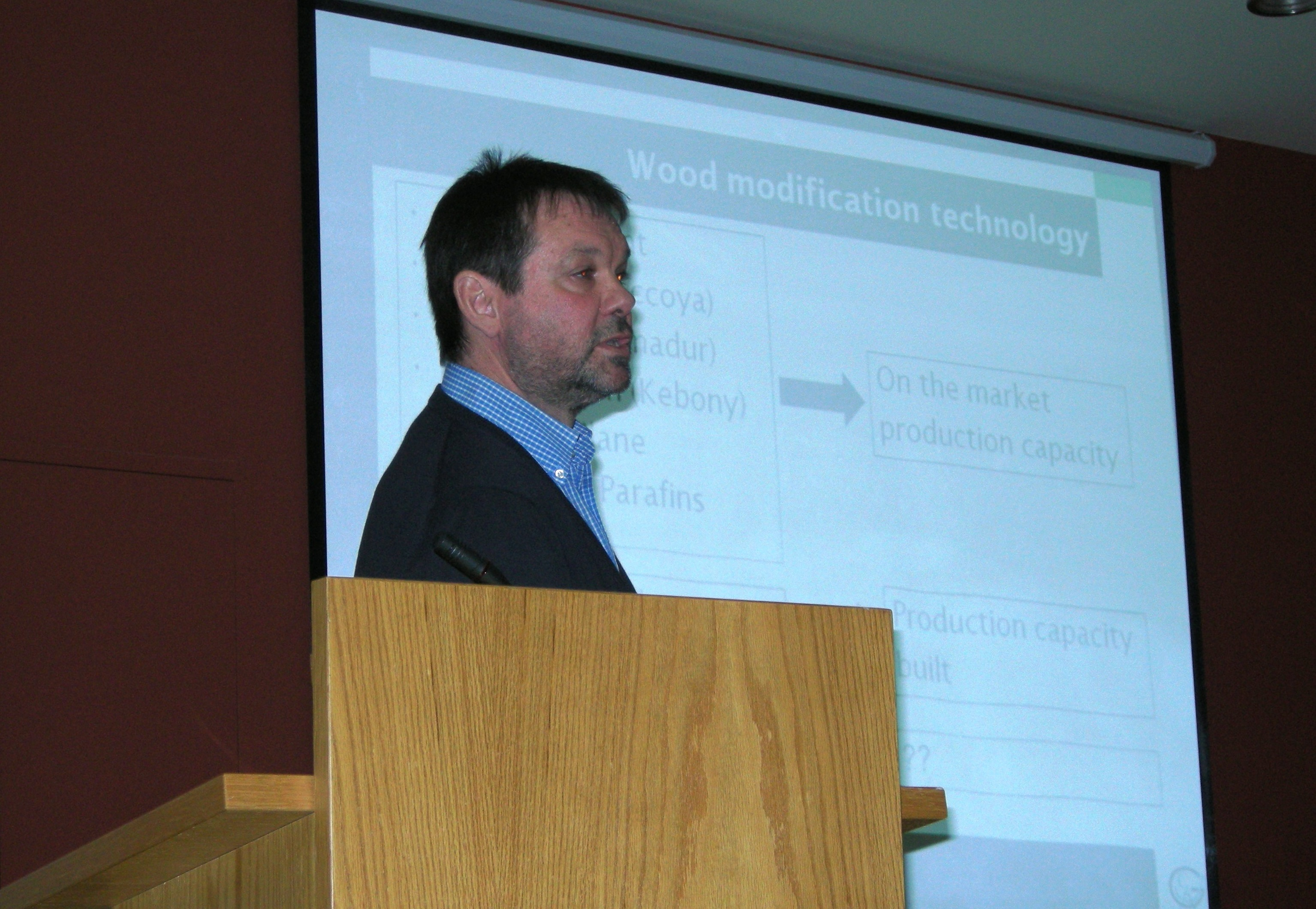
- Born: March 25, 1960 (age 66); Waldbröl, West Germany
- Education: University of Wageningen
- Occupations: Researcher; educator; wood scientist
- Years active: Since 1987
- Known for: wood acetylation, wood modification technologies

Holger Militz (Waldbröl, 25 March 1960) is a German wood scientist, senior researcher and professor at the University of Goettingen.

He is an elected fellow (FIAWS) and distinguished member of the International Academy of Wood Science, and recipient of both the Schweighofer Prize and the Marcus Wallenberg Prize.

He has made key contributions to the understanding of wood’s physical and chemical properties and to the development of chemical modification technologies, such as acetylation, furfurylation, and resin impregnation, which are well documented in the scientific literature of wood science. His yearlong research work has held a worldwide recognition.

== Early years ==
Militz was born in 1960 in Waldbröl, a small town in North Rhine-Westphalia, Germany.

== Career ==
He pursued his studies in wood science at the University of Hamburg. He then completed his PhD work in 1990 at the University of Wageningen in the Netherlands, focusing on enhancing the impregnation of wood through anatomical cell wall changes.

Between 1987 and 2000, he held positions in the Netherlands, initially serving as the head of wood technology at TNO Timber Research and later becoming the director of SHR Timber Research in Wageningen.

Militz along with his research corkers started up during the 90's at SHR the first feasible pilot plant, leading thus to the scaling-up of the today-commercial wood acetylation process, that had been initiated by American chemist, Alfred J. Stamm during the 1940's at Forest Products Laboratory.

Since 2000, he has held the position of a full professor at Wood Biology and Wood Products in the Georg-August-University in Göttingen. He has been a part-time professor at the Norwegian University of Life Sciences from 2010-2018.

His main research interests include wood technology, wood decay, wood protection and especially, wood modification applying green technologies. He possesses over 600 publications in many scientific journals and book articles in the area of wood science and technology.

Militz has won several awards for his novel work in the area of wood products and wood modification. He has been an active member of the editorial boards of the international wood journals, Holzforschung, European Journal of Wood and Wood Products, Wood Research, and Holztechnologie, while he is the chairman of the ECWM - Wood Modification in Europe since 2001.

In October 2023, a meta-research carried out by John Ioannidis et al.,. at Stanford University included Holger Militz in Elsevier Data 2022, where he was ranked in the top 2% of researchers in wood science (forestry – materials), having a c-score of 3.495, one of the highest three in this scientific area. In August 2024, Militz has acquired the same high international distinction for his research and scientific work in wood sciences (Elsevier Data 2023).

In April 2026, the Marcus Wallenberg Prize was awarded to Holger Militz for his contributions to research and industrialisation of wood modification technologies, most notably, the Accoya (acetylation process), the heat-based Plato process, and the Belmadur process.

== Personal life ==
Militz lives permanently in a small town outside of Goettingen. He has been married with Ute Militz, with whom he has two grown-up daughters.

== Awards ==
- Marcus Wallenberg Prize (2026)
- Honorary award, IRG Wood Protection, Australia (2023)
- Ternryd prize university Växjö, Sweden (2016)
- Josef-Umdasch Forschungspreis, Vienna (2012)
- Schweighofer-Prize for the development of an innovative new material (2007)
