= Alex Wiedenhoeft =

Alex C. Wiedenhoeft
- Alex C. Wiedenhoeft in 2023
- Born: Alex Charles Wiedenhoeft; 1976 (age 49–50)
- Education: University of Wisconsin–Madison
- Known for: Wood anatomy, forensic wood identification, XyloTron
- Scientific career
- Fields: Botany, wood anatomy, Forensic wood science
- Workplaces: Forest Products Laboratory, USDA Forest Service

Alex C. Wiedenhoeft (born in 1976) is an American botanist and wood anatomist, who is the current team leader at the Center for Wood Anatomy Research, housed within the Forest Products Laboratory of the USDA Forest Service in Madison, Wisconsin, USA.

He is an elected fellow (FIAWS) of the International Academy of Wood Science (2018), and recipient of the Forest Stewardship Council Leadership Award (2017) for his research work.

His research focuses on wood anatomy, wood identification, and forensic wood science, including the identification of wood evidence from crime scenes and illegally harvested timber. His recognised work also includes the development of machine-vision and molecular methods for wood identification.

== Research career ==
Wiedenhoeft earned his bachelor's, master's, and doctoral degrees in botany from the University of Wisconsin–Madison. His research work focuses on the anatomical structure and identification of wood, both for scientific classification and forensic investigation. He is considered as a leading expert in the field of forensic wood science, frequently working on cases involving illegal logging and timber trade violations.

He co-developed the XyloTron, a portable, open-source imaging system that enables macroscopic wood identification in field conditions. The system uses machine learning models to assist law enforcement and customs agents in identifying wood species, helping to combat global timber trafficking.

He also holds an adjunct associate professor position at the University of Wisconsin–Madison Department of Botany.

Additionally, he is presently an adjunct assistant professor in the Department of Forest Ecology and Management at Purdue University, and a professor estrangeiro in the Botany Department in the State of São Paulo University – Botucatu, Brazil, where he teaches graduate short courses in forensic wood science.

He has authored several scientific publications, including a widely cited book chapter titled Structure and Function of Wood in the Handbook of Wood Chemistry and Wood Composites. In 2024, he received -along with other three fellows from MSU- the George Marra Award by the International Society of Wood Science and Technology.
