= Acetylated wood =

Accoya, a type of modified wood

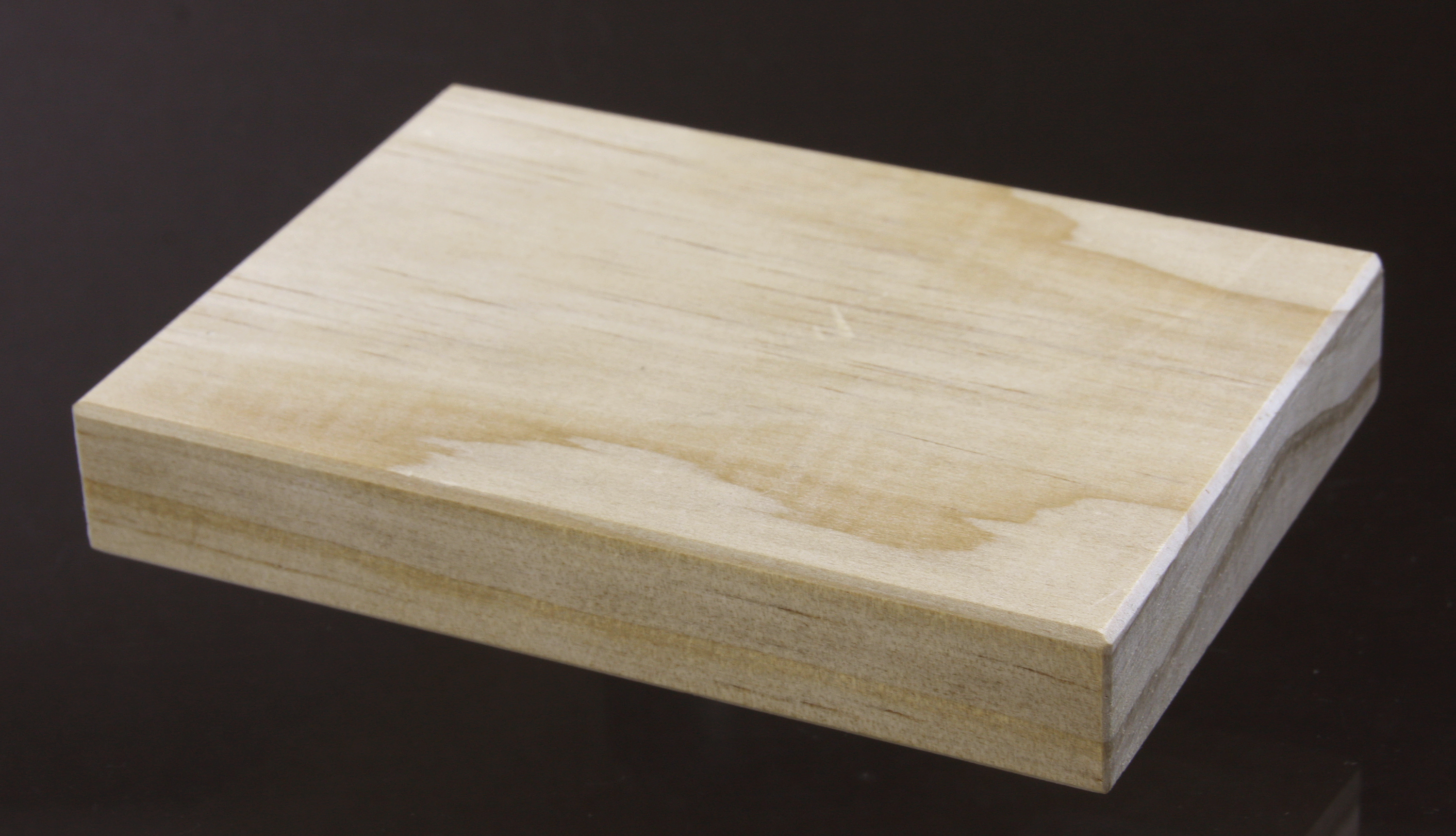
Sample of acetylated wood (Accoya)

Three-laminated acetylated wood specimen

Acetylated wood, or commercially known as Accoya, is a type of chemically modified wood that is produced through a chemical modification process.

It is produced from a chemical reaction (named as acetylation), involving acetic anhydride and a modification process to make wood highly resistant to biological attacks by fungi and wood-boring insects and durable to environmental conditions. It is a new wood product in the field of wood science, following decades of research and experimentation. It is increasingly known as Accoya which is the brand name of the primary maker.

The chemical modification occurs through the reaction of wood polymers especially the free hydroxyl groups present in lignin and hemicelluloses, without the need of a catalyst, forming bonds between them. The substances used, such as anhydrides, modify the structural components of wood without leaving toxic residues. This process prevents approximately 80-90% of hydroxyl (-OH) groups from forming hydrogen bonds with water molecules, effectively "locking" the cellular walls with the material. The chemical reagents employed are non-toxic, and the potential of recycling and disposal of acetylated wood can be accomplished without any restrictions.

Acetylated wood is characterized by its very light colour and has been shown to possess high durability and strong hydrophobic properties, as various research studies have indicated. This wood is suitable for outdoor wooden structures, as well as exterior flooring and decks. It is primarily produced from pine wood (Radiata pine), although beech is also occasionally used with this technology. Acetylated wood has minimal moisture absorption, significantly enhancing dimensional stability and natural resilience.

== Development of the technology ==
The first patent for wood acetylation was filed in 1930 by H. Suida, an Austrian chemist. Further fundamental research was conducted in the United States at the Forest Products Laboratory by the researchers Alfred J. Stamm and Harold Tarkow during the 1940s.

The primary material for acetylated wood is one that contains lignocellulose. Since wood acetylation aims to produce durable wood for outdoor use, wood, which typically contains lignin and cellulose, is usually the material of choice. Acetylation is typically performed using acetic anhydride in specialized reactors made of stainless steel. Given that acetic anhydride decomposes to produce acetic acid when it comes into contact with water, the moisture content of the raw material significantly influences the consumption of acetic anhydride. Therefore, it is advantageous to use raw materials that are as dry as possible (2-4%). In essence, any type of wood can be acetylated. However, since each type of wood behaves slightly differently during acetylation, the process needs to be adjusted to suit the specific wood type to achieve the desired product properties.

=== Production process ===
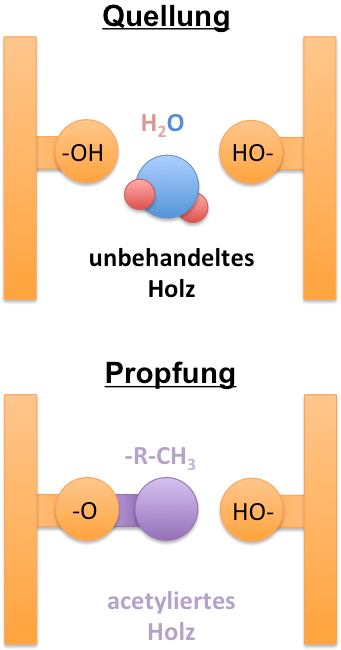
Diagram showing the blocking of free hydroxyl groups after the acetylation reaction

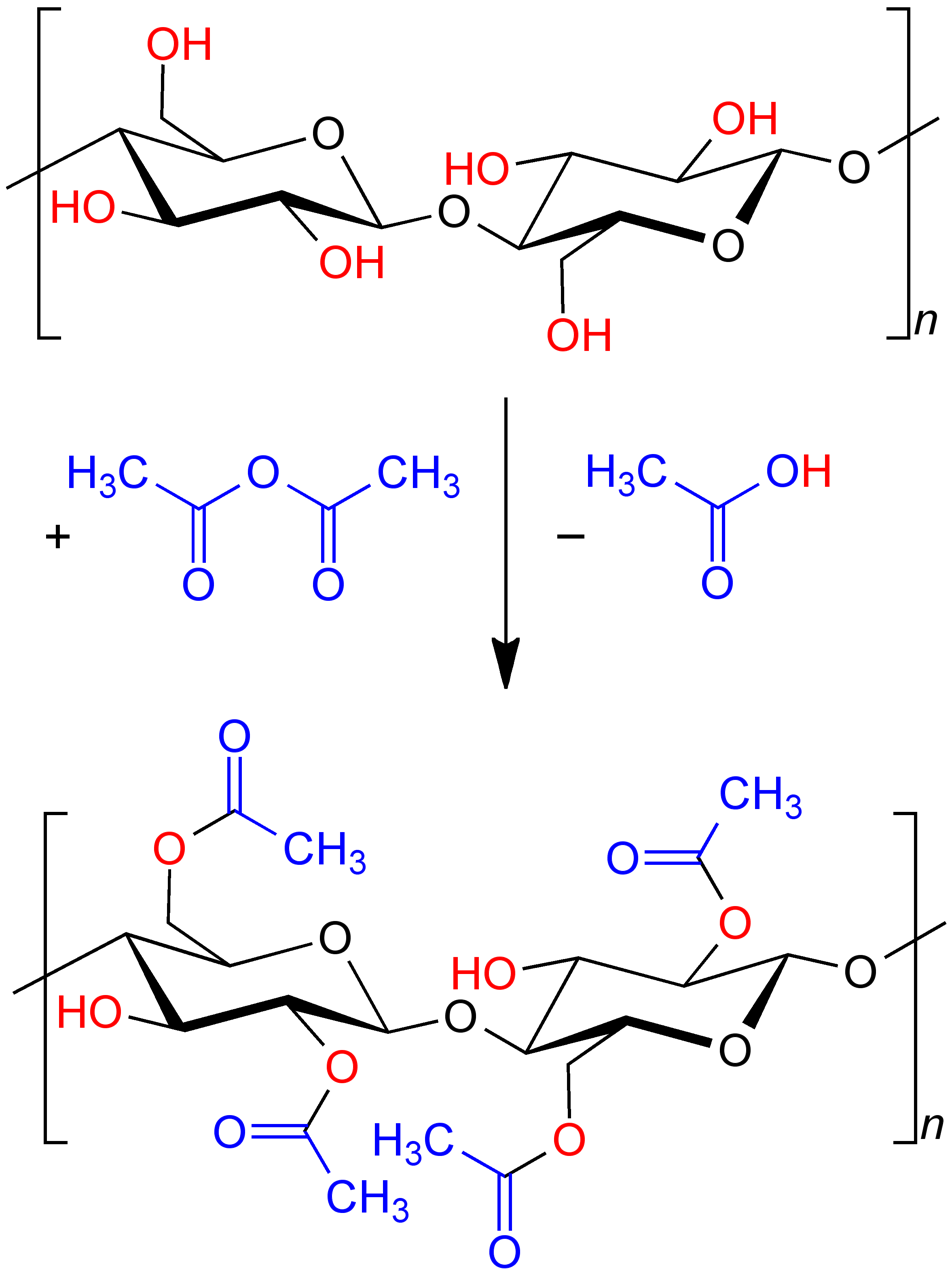
Diagram of cellulose acetylation: The red hydroxyl groups (-OH) of cellulose (see above) are partially acetylated by acetic anhydride, forming ester groups, while the resulting acetic acid is decomposed. The degree of acetylation varies; for example, two out of three hydroxyl groups are acetylated for each glucose structural unit.

The process begins with the introduction of chemical reactants into wood raw material, and the injection of the acetic anhydride solution. The solution can be introduced under vacuum, excess pressure, or at atmospheric pressure.

The acetylation process of wood involves impregnating the wood with an acetic anhydride solution under pressure or vacuum, heating the solution and the wood, and achieving a temperature of around 120 °C to allow the actual acetylation reaction between the wood and the reagent. The excess acetic anhydride solution that is not absorbed by the wood can be removed either before or after the acetylation reaction. To extract unreacted acetic anhydride and the resulting acetic acid from the wood, a final step involving distillation with water or steam is carried out to ensure that the wood is essentially free from acetic anhydride and acetic acid. This step is mainly to prevent the release of acetic acid odors from the final product into the environment, which is undesirable. The solution resulting from dehydration, vacuum extraction, and post-processing is collected and separated. The entire production process is time-consuming.

=== Degree of acetylation ===
The degree of acetylation (i.e., acetyl content) needs to be estimated by various methods to achieve successful results. A minimum acetylation degree of at least 20%-22% is required for high-strength wood. Due to the incorporation of acetyl groups, similar to water molecules, causing swelling of wood, the increase in volume can serve as a parameter for the degree of acetylation. On the other hand, the percentage increase in weight, known as WPG (weight percent gain), can be used after acetylation. This also allows for conclusions to be drawn regarding the quantity of anhydrous oxalic acid that ultimately becomes chemically bound to the wood in the cell walls.

Further parameters that can be used to assess the degree of acetylation include resistance to water leaching, electrical conductivity, or methods such as HPLC analysis or spectrophotometry.

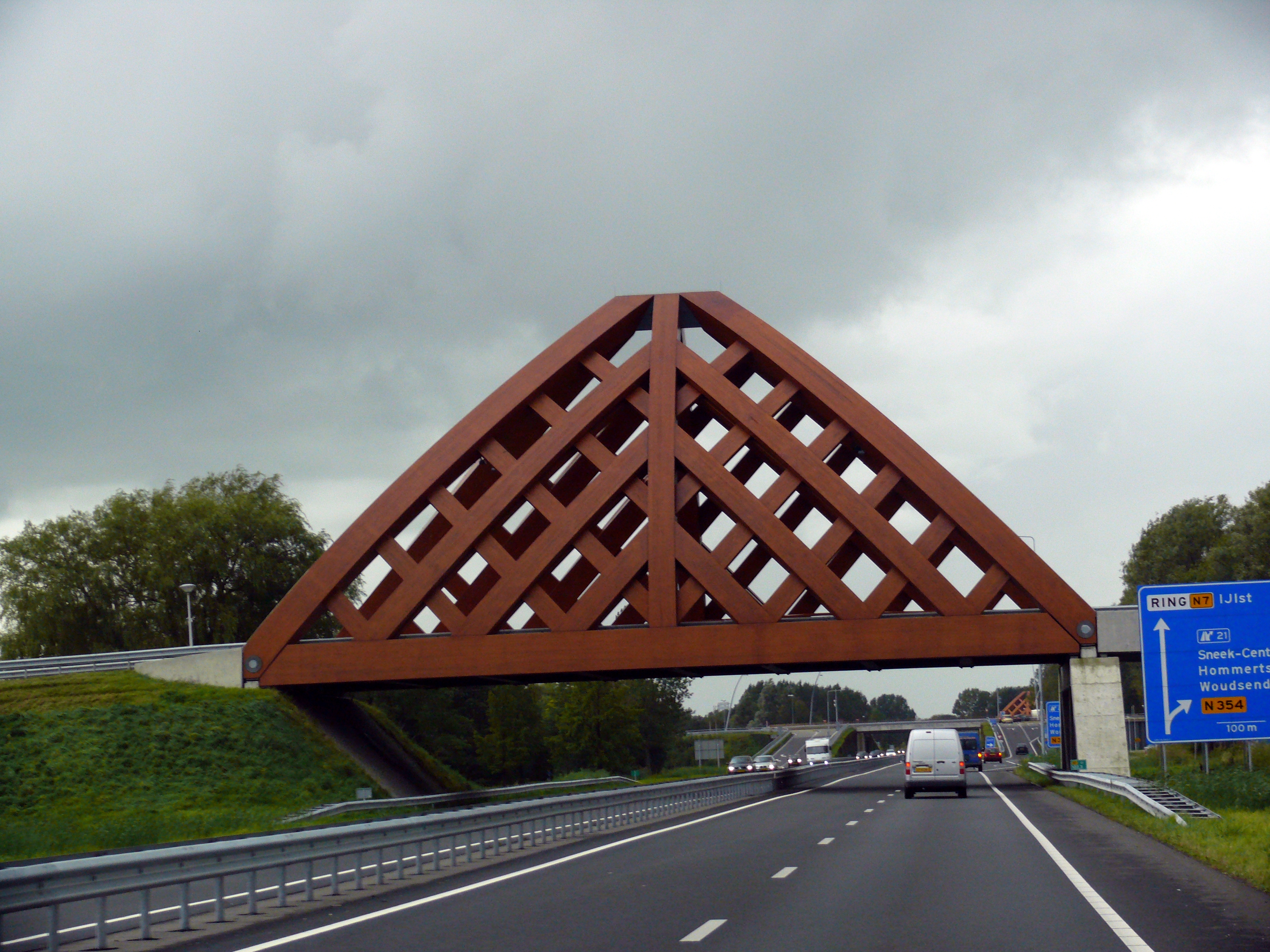
Timber bridge in the Netherlands, which was constructed with glulam of acetylated pine wood

== Properties and characteristics ==
Acetylation permanently alters the chemical composition of wood. This chemical modification positively affects various mechanical and physical properties, as well as the wood's resistance to insects and microorganisms that degrade it.

Depending on the type of wood and the extent of modification, acetylation typically results in wood discoloration and an increase in density and hardness. Depending on the level of post-processing, the final wood product may have a more or less pronounced acetic acid odor, easily detectable during cutting.

=== Water absorption ===
During the acetylation process, the hydrophilic hydroxyl groups within the polymer structure of the wood's cell walls chemically react to form highly hydrophobic acetoxy groups. As a result, the hydrophobic nature of wood significantly limits its ability to absorb or release water. This means that acetylated wood exhibits a much lower equilibrium moisture content compared to natural, non-acetylated wood.

The maximum equilibrium moisture content of regular wood is typically around 30% (referred to usually as fiber saturation point of wood), while wood that has undergone acetylation treatment (with a WPG of 20%) has a final equilibrium moisture content of only 10-12%. Furthermore, water absorption rate is greatly reduced during the acetylation process.

=== Dimensional stability ===
Replacing the hydrophilic hydroxyl groups within the polymer structure of wood's cell walls, e.g., cellulose, lignin, hemicelluloses, with hydrophobic acetyl groups also positively impacts its dimensional stability. This refers to the wood's ability to maintain its dimensions in changing climatic conditions. Acetylated wood exhibits approximately 70 to 80% greater dimensional stability compared to untreated natural wood. Consequently, it experiences significantly reduced swelling and shrinkage.

=== Biological resistance ===
Acetylation enhances the biological (natural) resistance of wood. Its resistance to decay by fungi, insects, and other factors is significantly improved. The reduction of maximum equilibrium moisture content to the range of 10-20% in acetylated wood prevents the minimal moisture required for fungal growth. Additionally, the molecular structures of the cell wall, which are easily degraded by fungi, change with acetylation in such a way that fungal hyphae can no longer penetrate through the porous cell wall and break it down.

=== Resistance to weathering ===
Various wood species can be fully protected from brown, white, or soft rot through acetylation and upgraded to the highest resistance class, Class 1, such as exceptionally durable tropical species like teak, merbau, azobe, and iroko. Acetylation can also improve wood's resistance to decay by bacteria and termites.

=== Resistance to environmental conditions ===
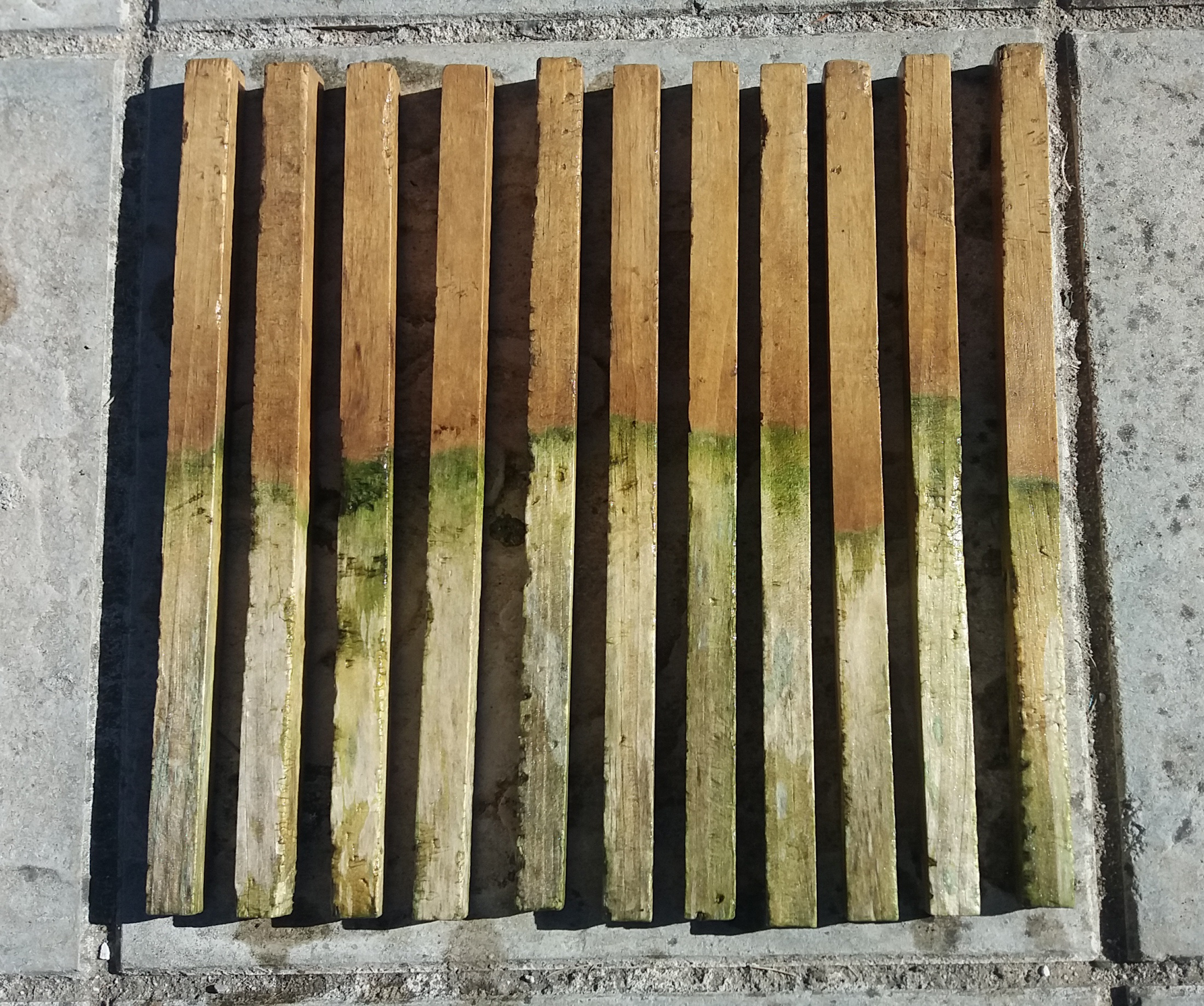
Acetylated wood specimens which have undergone a 10-year soil test.

In addition to wood decay caused by fungi, wood exposed to sunlight and rain-hail-snow undergoes photochemical degradation and gradual decomposition. On the wooden surface exposed to sunlight, low molecular weight degradation products from photo-oxidative reactions are slowly and gradually produced, primarily triggered by ultraviolet radiation. These degradation products are washed away by rain over time, resulting in either wood bleaching and a change in surface structure or localized dark spots.

Because acetylated wood has a much lower equilibrium moisture content than untreated wood, the degradation products are washed away more slowly. Additionally, the photooxidative degradation of acetylated wood's polymers occurs more slowly. Acetylation cannot stop the process of photochemical degradation in wood, but it can significantly slow it down. Recent research has shown that acetylated wood is best treated with surface finishes or even paints.

== Industrial producers ==
The first trials to scale up the process during the decades of 1960 and 1970 were fully unsuccessful. However, the wood scientist, Dr. Holger Militz along with his research coworkers started up during the 90's at SHR, in the Netherlands, the first feasible pilot plant with successful trials. Thus, this led to the scaling-up of the acetylation process.

Afterwards, the company named "Accsys Technologies," based in London (formerly "Titan Wood"), was the sole industry producing acetylated wood. In 2007, the production of this product on a larger scale began using radiata pine (Pinus radiata) sourced from Australia and New Zealand, under the brand name Accoya at the company's manufacturing facilities in Arnhem, in the Netherlands.

Eastman Chemical began producing acetylated wood again in 2024 at its Kingsport location, through a joint venture with Accsys Technologies, after having taken a decade long break in production for unknown reasons from 2014 to 2024.

== Types of modified wood ==
- Furfurylated wood (Kebony), which is also produced from radiata pine but can also come from American southern yellow pine and ash.
- Thermally Modified Wood - wood that has undergone thermal modification in a kiln without the use of chemicals.
- Impregnated wood, which is wood that has been pressure-treated with protective chemical compounds.
