= Thermally modified wood =

Type of engineered wood

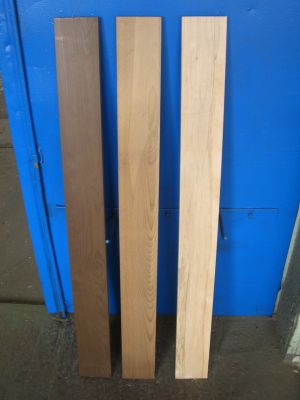
Beechwood processed at different temperatures. From left to right: 200 °C, 190 °C, untreated

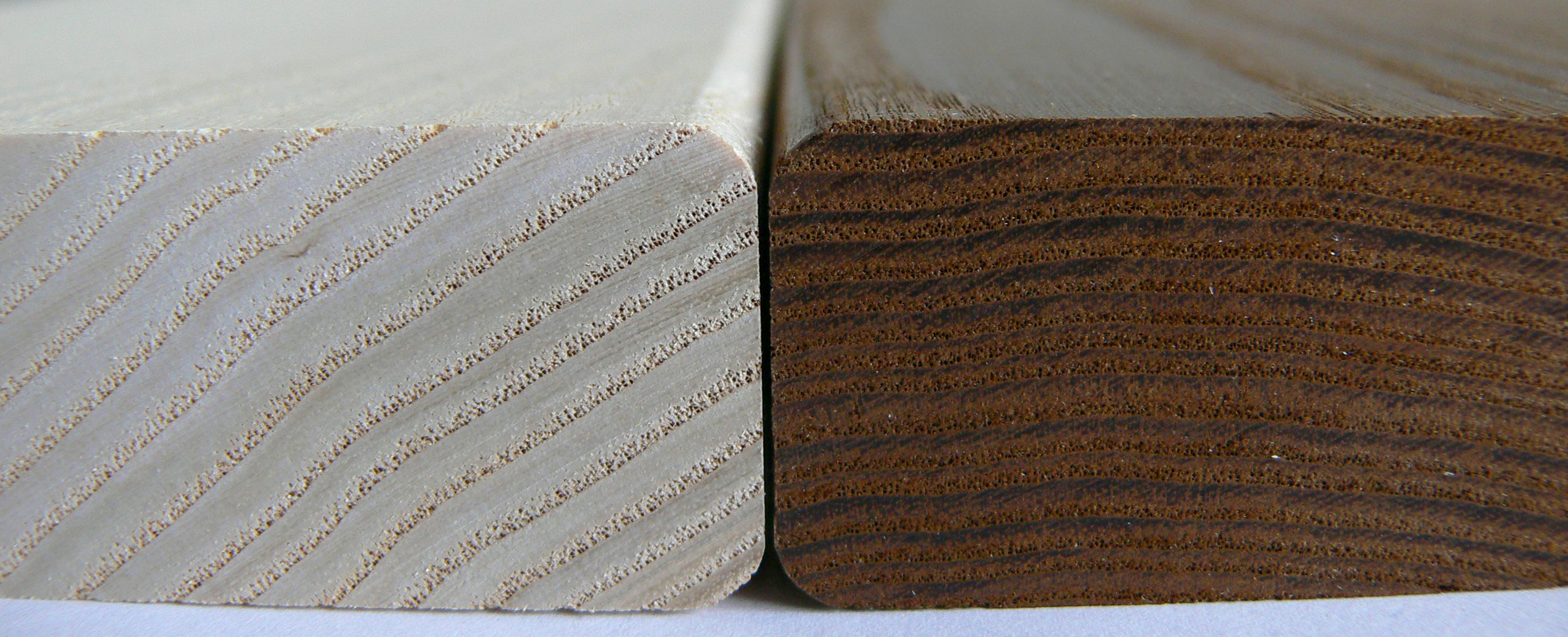
comparison European Ash, left= untreated, right= thermally modified

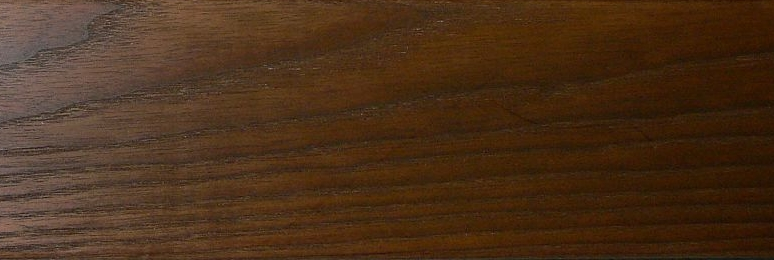
wood surface, thermally modified European Ash wood

Thermally modified wood is any thermally-treated timber that has been modified by a controlled process of pyrolysis, in which it is heated to temperatures above 180 °C in an oxygen-free atmosphere. This process changes the chemical structure of the wood's cell wall components – lignin, cellulose and hemicellulose – which decreases its hygroscopicity and thus increases its dimensional stability. Low oxygen content prevents the wood from burning at these high temperatures. Several different technologies use different media including nitrogen gas, steam and hot oil. All processes degrade strength and toughness of the treated lumber to some degree.

== Modification processes ==
In 1946 the US Forest Service conducted partially successful experiments by submersing wood in a liquid metal alloy (zinc, lead and cadmium) to produce a heat stabilized product (proposed to be named staybwood) and concluded:

"An appreciable degree of dimensional stabilization and decay resistance can be imparted to wood by dry heat, This can be accomplished over a broad range of temperatures and times, the time of heating decreasing rapidly with an increase in temperature,
This heat treatment causes a serious loss in strength properties, especially toughness and abrasion resistance. When the wood is heated beneath the surface of a molten metal the strength loss for any antishrink efficiency is less than when heated in air. The strength loss is still too great to make this a commercially applicable method for obtaining dimensional stabilization of wood, except perhaps for some abnormal use where strength is of relatively little importance."

A process of thermal modification of pressurized wood with a medium moisture content was described in a paper by Burmester in 1973.

Today there are five different thermal modification processes. Finland produced Thermowood also known as Premium wood. France uses the Les Bois Perdure Retification process, the Netherlands uses the Plato process while Germany uses Oil-heat treatment. Westwood Process and the AlphaInterloc processes are proprietary process technologies in the USA.

== Description of the process ==
Three of the processes are performed in one step, using oil (oil-heat treatment), nitrogen (Reti wood) and steam (Le-Bois Perdure). The Thermo wood process consists of drying, heat treatment and finally cooling/conditioning, and takes up to 72 hours. The Plato process consists of hydrothermolysis, dry curing and conditioning, and can take up to 7 days. The required time depends on wood species, width and initial moisture content.

=== Westwood Process ===
Westwood is the most advanced modern thermo-modification process, patented in 2004. The process has initially developed for treatment hardwoods, which are more complicated compared to softwoods due to thermo-chemical reactions appeared in hardwoods during thermo-treatment. The fully automated Westwood control system allows to manage thermo-treatment of any hardwoods and softwood species.

=== AlphaInterloc Process ===
AlphaInterloc process is an advanced thermo-chemical, Exothermic reaction proprietary process pending and Copyright 2022. This process uses specialized thermo-mechanical process. The AlphaInterloc process is entirely green technology.

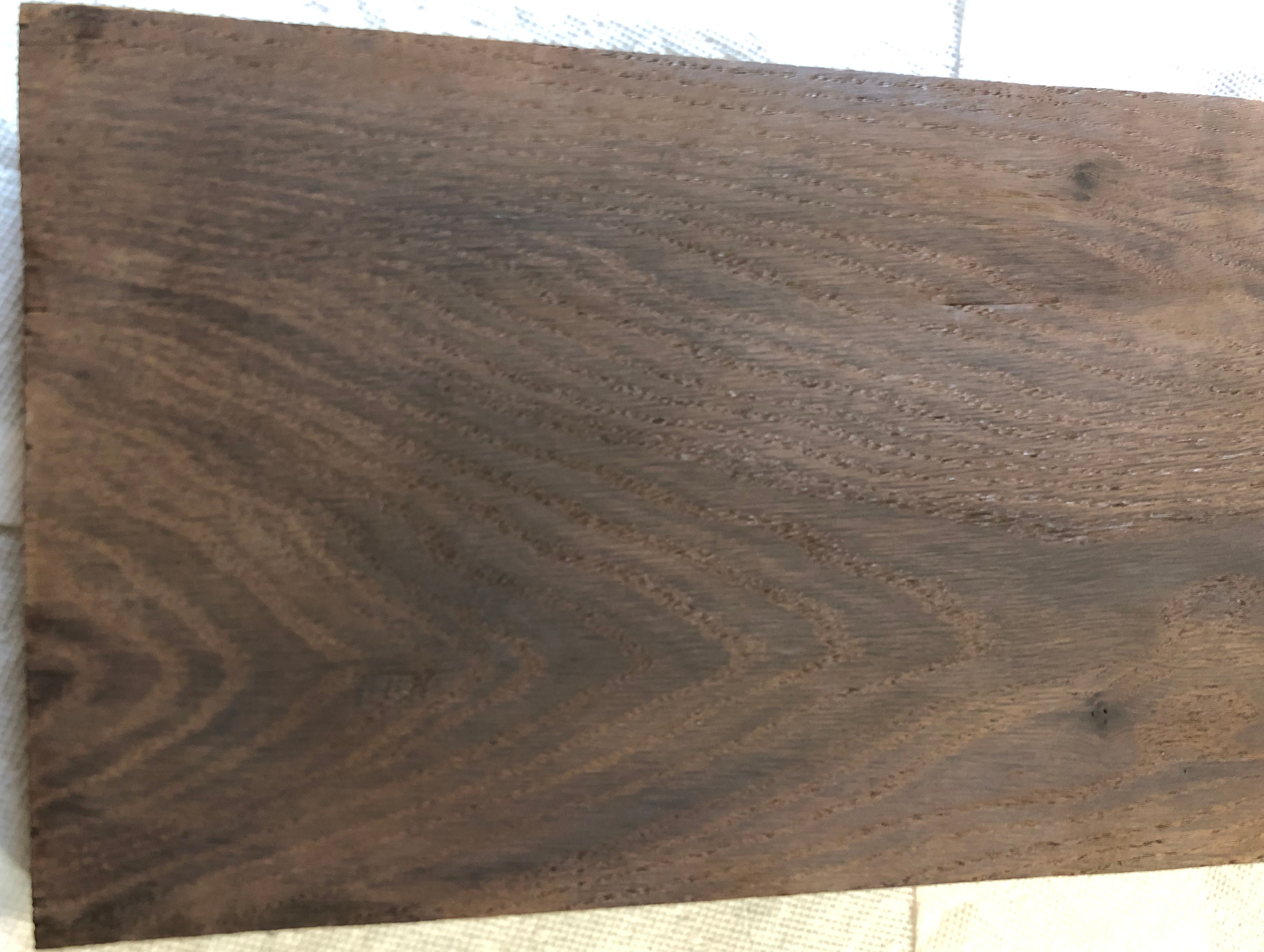
Oak wood thermally treated

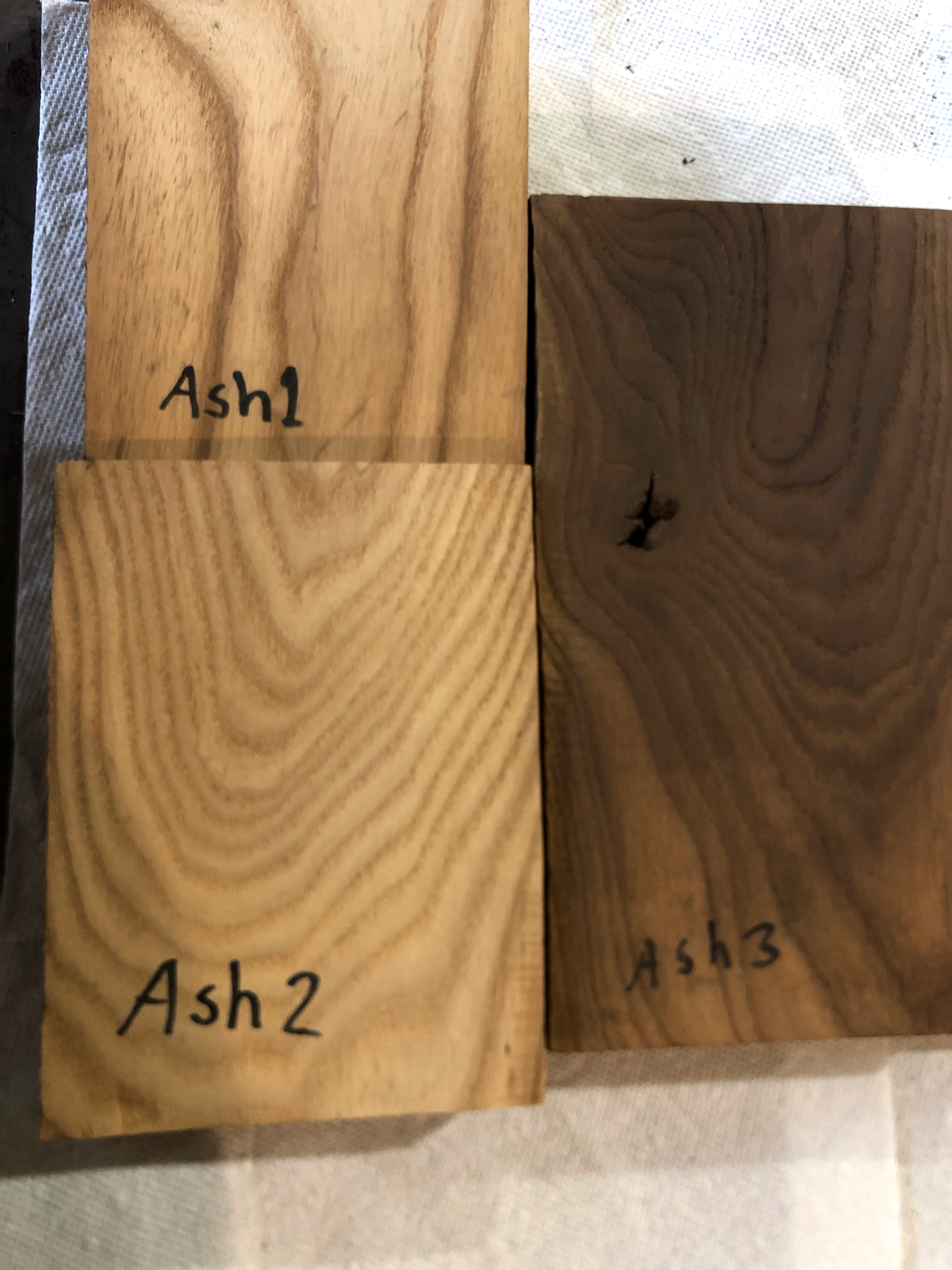
Ash woods treated in different temperatures

=== Retification ===
Retification refers to the French word rétification, which is the portmanteau of réticulation (creation of chemical bonds between polymeric chains) and torréfaction (roasting). Wood in this process must have a moisture content at 12% or lower which can be attained through simple drying processes. The wood is then placed in a high nitrogen atmosphere with no more than 2% oxygen content. The Perdure Process is relatively similar to retification but holds the wood at a lower temperature.

=== ThermoWood ===
ThermoWood is a thermally modified wood material produced using heat and steam in a low-oxygen environment. The process alters the chemical composition of the wood, resulting in changes to its physical and mechanical properties. Thermal modification generally improves dimensional stability, reduces equilibrium moisture content, and enhances resistance to biological decay, while also producing a more uniform colour throughout the material. However, the process can reduce certain mechanical properties, including bending strength and splitting resistance, depending on treatment conditions.

Genuine industrial-scale ThermoWood process was developed in Finland in the 1990s. The process was patented. ThermoWood is a registered trademark owned by the International ThermoWood Association, and the legal right to use the ThermoWood trademark is held by its members. The association defines standard treatment classes, including Thermo-S (stability) and Thermo-D (durability), which correspond to different temperature ranges and performance characteristics.

In industrial applications, treatment parameters may be adjusted depending on the intended end use, and not all thermally modified wood products are classified strictly within the standard Thermo-S and Thermo-D categories.

== Characteristics of thermally modified wood ==
The main advantage is that softwood can be used for applications that require high durability. Durability class 1–3, according to European Standard EN 350-2, can be obtained out of non durable (class 5) softwood species.

The main disadvantage is that the strength is decreased as a result of the high temperatures. In general the bending strength is reduced up to 30% with more reduction at higher temperatures.

The biological resistance against some (not all) micro-organisms and insects is improved. However, due to breakdown of volatile organic compounds (VOC) the antimicrobial properties of wood may also decrease. Shrinking and swelling is reduced up to 50–90%. The treated wood is somewhat darkened in colour.

As a principle the heat treatment process can be done on all wood species.

== Maturity of the technology ==
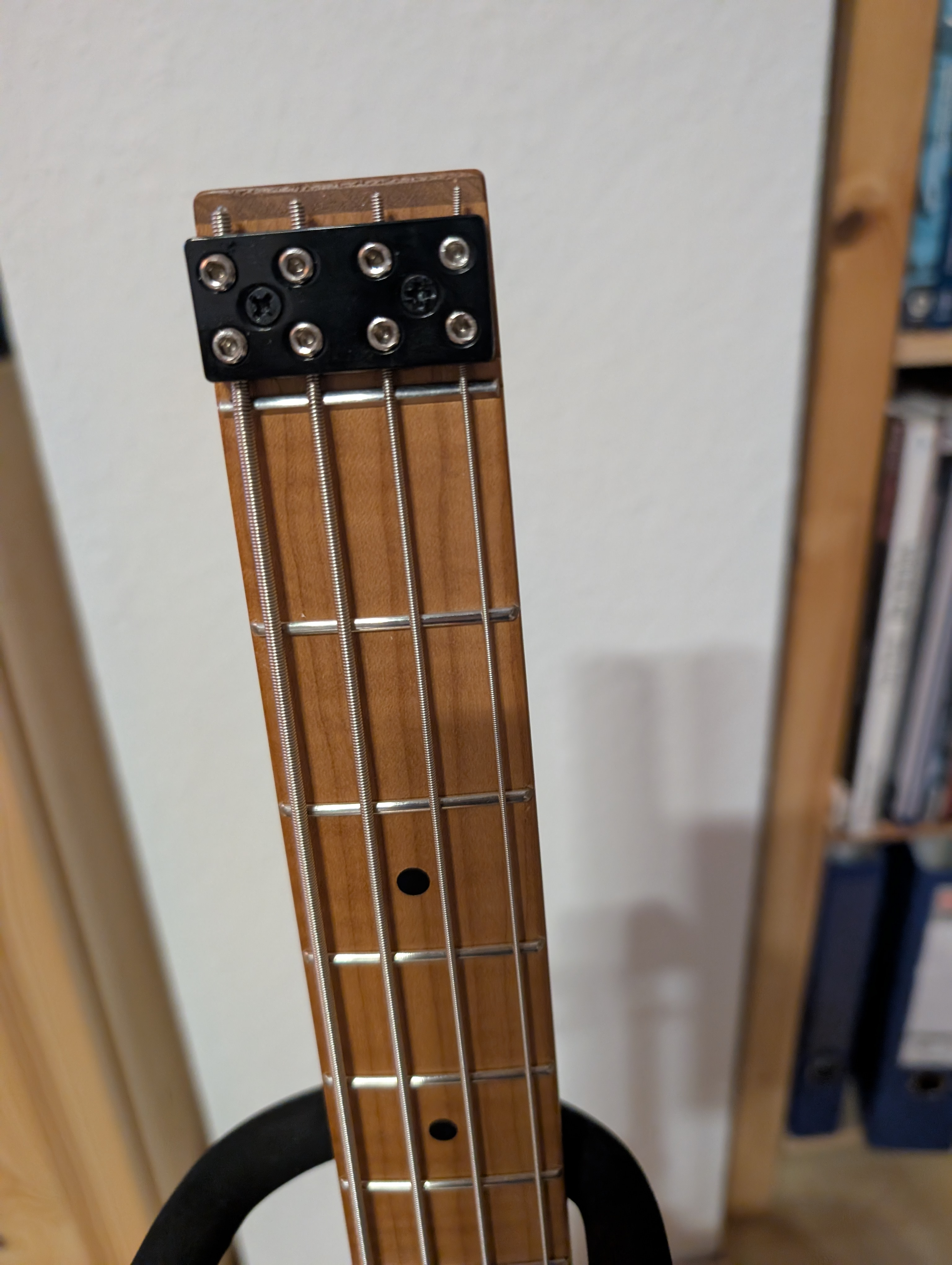
electric bass guitar with "roasted" maple fretboard by Kolibri Guitars

Thermally modified wood is not just an academic topic these days. Thermal wood treatment has already been penetrating the market for a number of years. In the United States, thermally modified wood was pioneered by Igor Shternberg (Danchenko), whose company, Westwood, became the first in the country to launch industrial-scale production of thermally modified lumber in 2007. There is also some industrial input in the research and development. The Natural Resources Research Institute at the University of Minnesota Duluth has a pilot-scale kiln to research the effectiveness of thermal modification on the Minnesota tree species to expand the wood markets.

In the guitar-making industry, this process is called "Thermo Curing", "Baked" and "Roasted", among other names. Some guitar manufacturers have begun using acoustic sound boards and electric guitar fretboards that are thermally cured in order to help prevent the typical warping and cracking that often occurs from seasonal humidity swings. As a secondary benefit, acoustic guitars tend to sound like well-broken-in aged instruments much sooner than do non-thermally modified guitars. See more under Tonewood: Preparation.

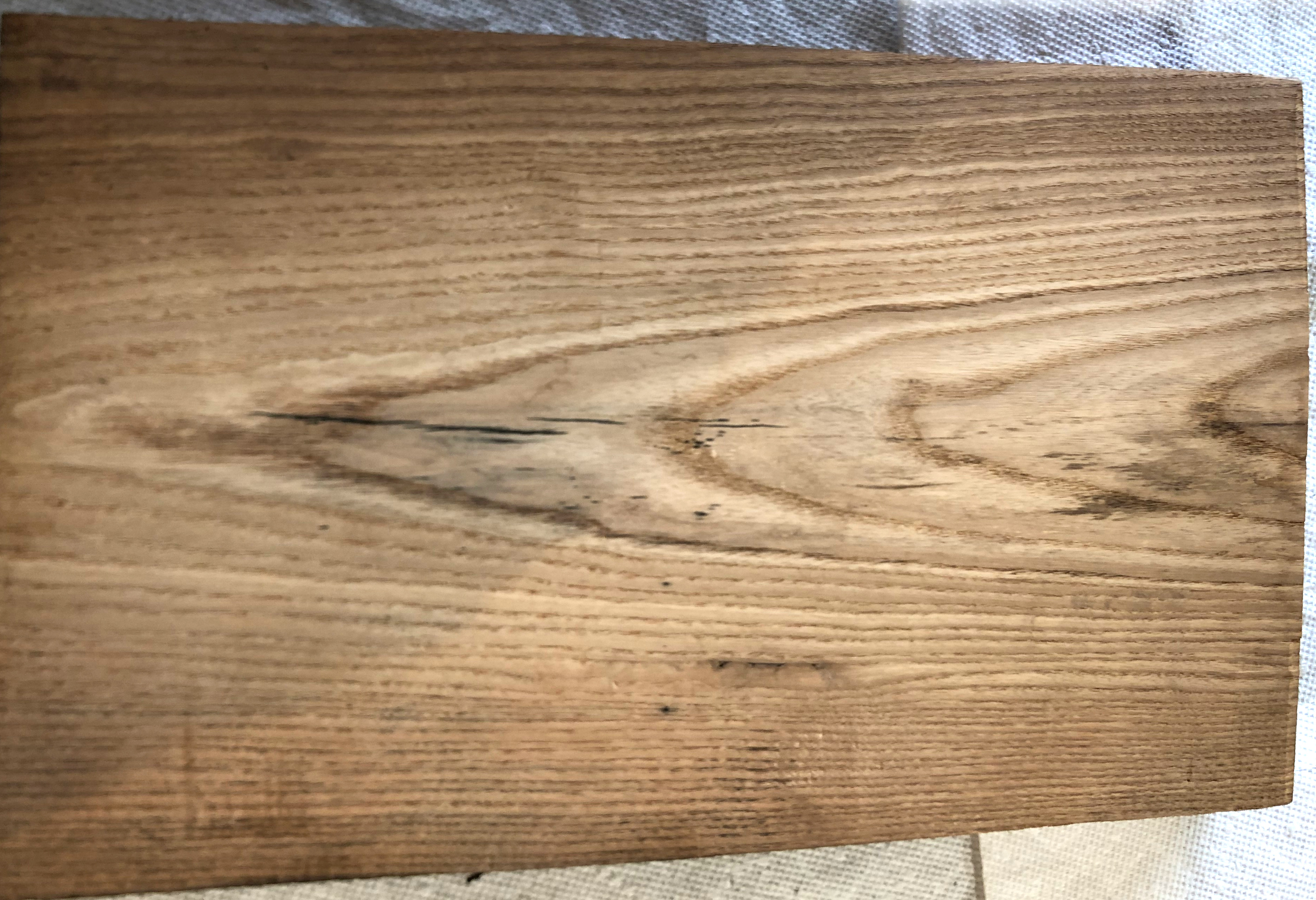
Alphainterloc exotic wood process

== Main companies in the industry ==
In Europe, thermally modified wood production on a commercial scale has been concentrated largely in Estonia. Estonia is geographically close to the major Finnish producers of thermo-kilns, while labor and overhead costs are lower than in Finland or the Scandinavian countries. Three major Estonian producers of thermally modified wood emerged in the late 1990s: Brenstol OU, Tre-Timber OU and Ha-Serv. All 3 companies focused on providing sauna materials for the Finnish market and interior flooring—Brenstol specializing in hardwoods and Tre-Timber specializing in softwoods. In the early 2000s, Brenstol purchased Tre-Timber, becoming the largest producer of thermally modified wood.

At about that time, the market for thermally modified wood expanded dramatically from its traditional application in sauna materials, to include exterior products, such as decking (terrace) and cladding (siding). While Ha-Serv continued to focus primarily on the Finnish sauna market, Brenstol established the Thermory brand and begin to export across Europe and to Japan and Thermory has become the most widely recognized brand of thermally modified wood in these regions. The market for thermally modified exterior products increased very rapidly as European consumers increasingly looked for alternatives to tropical woods from Asia, Africa and South America. A Turkish producer, Nova Wood, also started producing of thermally modified wood and became a minor player in European markets.

In 2012, Brenstol established an affiliate in the U.S., Thermory USA and began to expand aggressively in markets around the world. The Thermory brand has become well-established in the U.S. and Canada, and has been shipped to over 55 countries around the world. In 2016, Thermory's revenue was 29 mln euros, with 1.8 mln euros in profit.

Small, local producers continue to emerge in each region, but there are high barriers to entry into the thermally modified wood market—particularly for thermally modified hardwoods. The proper thermal modification equipment is extremely expensive. In addition, because the technology is not well known, there is little public information available about drying schedules, and many new producers of thermally modified woods experience a large % of drying defects, discoloration, brittleness, equipment malfunctions (including fires) and an inability to obtain the high durability ratings that more established producers, like Brenstol (Thermory), have achieved. In 2018, Thermory purchased Ha-Serv, becoming the market leader in the thermally modified wood segment.

The latest research of thermo modification process showed that the coloration of wood during thermo-treatment is not necessary leading to its durability and stability: the reactions which are responsible for changing color during modification are different from reactions that are responsible for durability. Not all brown wood should be considered really thermo-modified.

== Ongoing research ==
There is ongoing research to optimize the industrial processes and the various parameters to produce it and to develop the applications for this wood. There is also research in order to find new wood heat treatment processes, even trying to combine different wood modification processes.

AlphaInterloc is a company that is doing current process engineering and equipment design in USA North America.

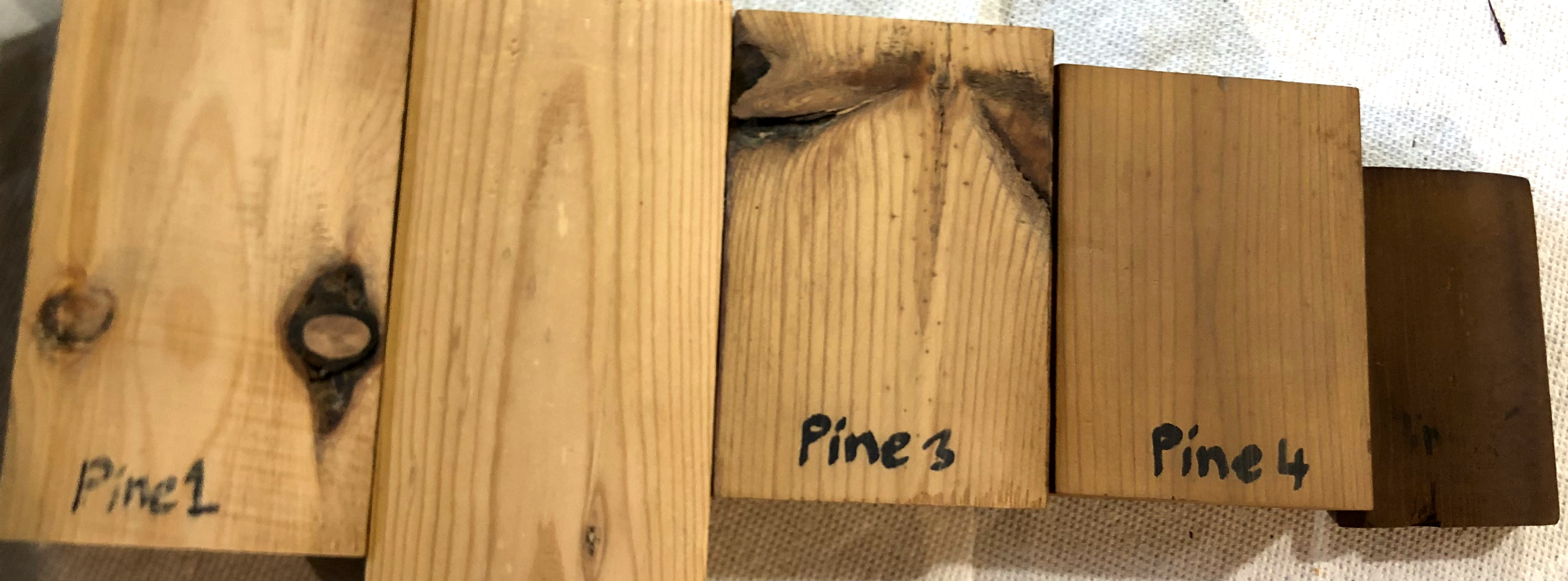
AlphaInterloc Pine Processes

== See also ==
- Acetylated wood - another process for improving the durability of wood, using chemical rather than thermal means
- Furfurylated wood - another chemical process for improving the durability of wood
- Yakisugi
