= Harold Tarkow =

American chemist and wood scientist

- Harold Tarkow in 1958
- Born: 1912; Milwaukee, Wisconsin, US
- Died: 10 February 2012; Madison, Wisconsin, US
- Education: University of Wisconsin-Madison

Harold Tarkow (1912-2012) was an American chemist and wood scientist, who was an elected fellow of the International Academy of Wood Science.

== Career ==
Tarkow studied at the University of Wisconsin-Madison taking his BSc and MSc degrees, and then completed his PhD in Physical Chemistry in 1939. He began his career as an organic chemist at the Portland Cement Association in Chicago. He also taught at the Bradley Polytechnic Institute in Peoria, Illinois.

He joined the FPL laboratories in 1943 as a research chemist. He worked under the supervision of organic chemist Alfred J. Stamm. They conducted jointly research on the chemical modification of wood, examining the interaction of wood with moisture and polymeric materials.

In addition, Tarkow worked on the dimensional stability of wood, wood swelling and shrinking, and the modification of wood with resins. Along with Stamm, he investigated wood acetylation, resin impregnation and other methods to improve the physical, mechanical and biological properties of wood.

In 1970, Tarkow took the position of the chief of the Division of Wood Chemistry at the FPL. He retired from FPL in 1977.

== Recognition ==
In 1968, he was elected at the IAWS for his research work. Until October 2026, the research work of Tarkow has gathered more than 2,300 citations at Google Scholar.
