= Alfred J. Stamm =

American chemist and wood scientist (1897-1985

Alfred A. Stamm

Alfred J. Stamm (29 December 1897–1985) was an American chemist and pioneering wood scientist, who worked at the Forest Products Laboratory and was a distinguished fellow of the International Academy of Wood Science.

His key research contributions in the physical and chemical properties of wood as well as in the chemical modification of wood (acetylation, furfurylation, resin impregnation) have been well recorded in the literature and gained a global attention in the scientific area of wood science. Most of that novel research was carried out with his fellow Harold Tarkow.

Stamm attained his PhD degree in the field of physical chemistry from the University of Wisconsin. Following a long and fruitful 34-year tenure at the Forest Products Laboratory in Madison, Wisconsin, Stamm assumed a position at the School of Forestry at North Carolina State University in 1959, where he dedicated his efforts to both pedagogy and scholarly research until his retirement in 1970.

During his career, Stamm authored several publications on the subjects of wood physics and chemistry, and his contributions earned him several awards in recognition of his scholarly achievements.

Until October 2026, the research work of Stamm has gathered more than 12,840 citations at Google Scholar.

== Selected books ==
- Principles of Wood Science and Technology (3,360 citations)
- Wood and Cellulose Science (1,904 citations)
