= XyloTron =

Wood identification system using machine vision and AI

Xylotron
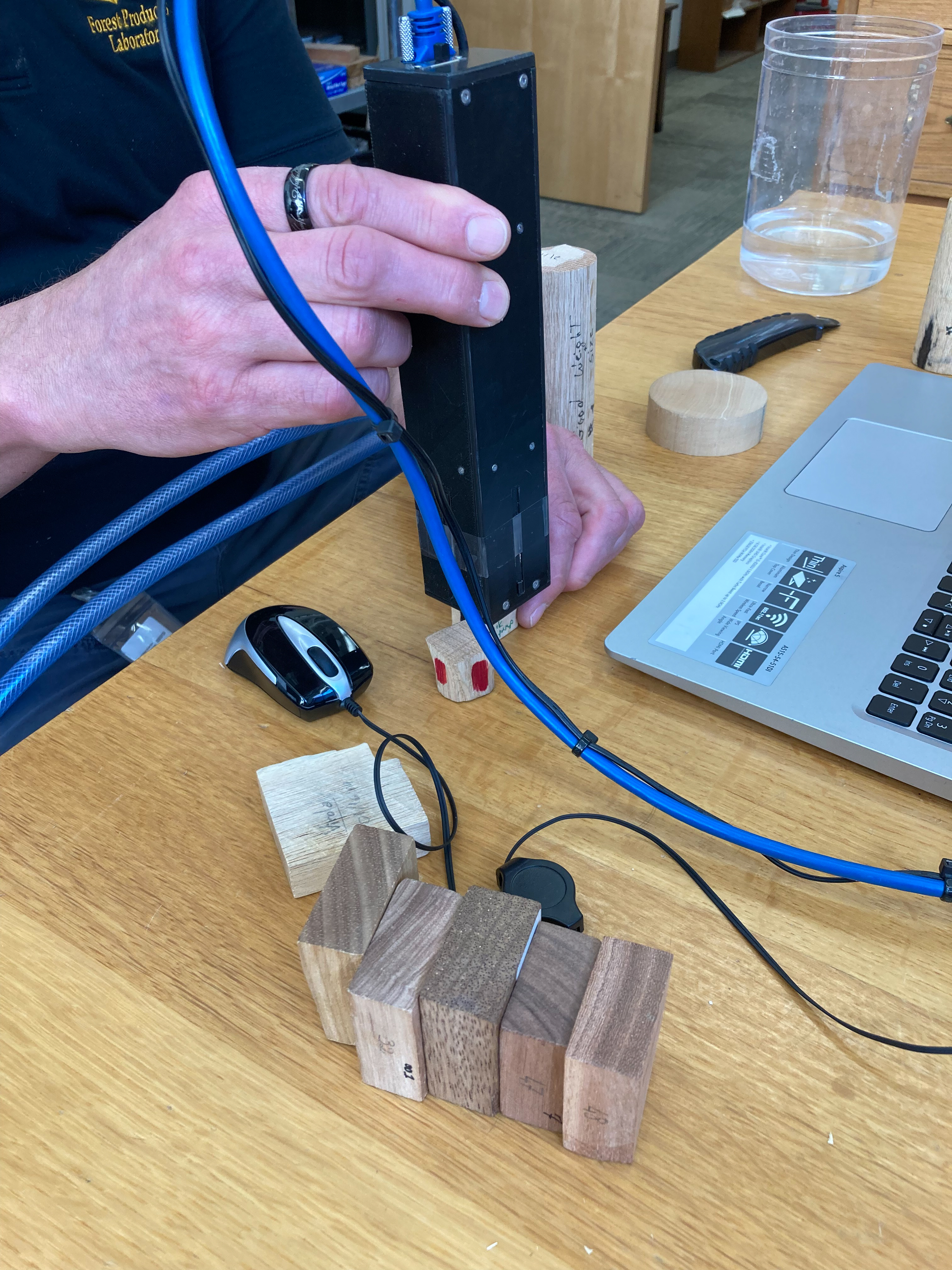
- A researcher at the FPL demonstrates the Xylotron (USDA Forest Service)

The XyloTron is a portable wood identification system, which was developed to support the wood supply chain, and the enforcement of laws against illegal logging. The device uses computer vision wood identification models to classify wood specimens based on their macroscopic anatomy and requires minimal operator training. Designed for use in laboratory and field settings, the system provides a non-destructive method to rapidly identify wood. The system's accuracy depends on the quality of the training data, the breadth and anatomical complexity of woods in the model, and the similarity of unknown samples to those included in the model. Use of the XyloTron is intended to help establish probable cause in cases of possible illegal logging, rather than for high-stakes legal enforcement or forensic confirmation. Microscopic analysis of wood specimens by a wood anatomist may still be required.

== Overview ==
The XyloTron system was developed at the United States Department of Agriculture, Forest Service, Forest Products Laboratory in Madison, Wisconsin. Initial conceptual work began in late 2010. The XyloTron uses a laptop or desktop computer for computation and the XyloScope, which is specialized, custom-designed hardware that captures controlled imaging using a scientific-grade digital camera, lens, and lighting array.

Unlike traditional wood identification techniques that rely on microscopic analysis by trained experts, the XyloTron uses image-based classification. It captures standardized images of a wood surface using the XyloScope then compares the image of the unknown specimen against a model trained on verified reference specimens. The system’s hardware and software are open source. Models used by the XyloTron are trained using labeled image datasets of known wood species, typically derived from scientific-quality reference collections. Because it is designed to work offline, the XyloTron can be deployed in remote field locations without internet access. Field trials in South America, Southeast Asia, and Africa have demonstrated the system’s utility in identifying timber suspected to be harvested illegally with minimal field agent training.

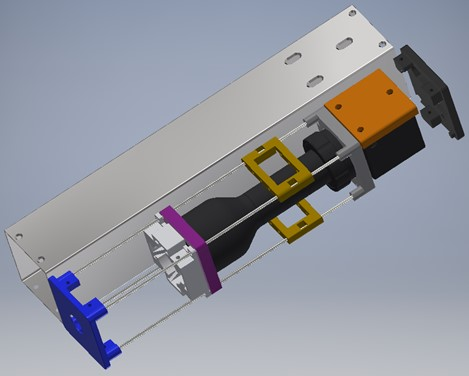
A 3D rendering of the larger internal components of the XyloScope 2.0 and its stainless steel housing.

The initial design of the XyloScope was published in 2019 with engineering drawings and a bill of materials for the hardware, then was superseded by the 2020 publication of the XyloTron 2.0. The update added UV illumination and variable positioning of the lighting array, a mechanically superior design for focal stability, and freely available software for general imaging, reference imaging, and wood identification. Also included was a bill of materials, design files for the electronics, all 3D files, and an illustrated assembly manual. The XyloTron 2.0 supports imaging woods (or other materials) with UV fluorescence, as well as macroscopic imaging of charcoal for computer vision wood identification.

Research using the XyloTron focused first on collaborative work developing wood identification models for specific regions. or groups of endangered or related species. Subsequently, scientists explored how much “noise” these models could tolerate and how to build highly accurate, larger models, for example, to cover North American commercial hardwoods. Current work is focused primarily on extracting wood anatomical data from XyloTron image datasets.

== XyloPhone ==
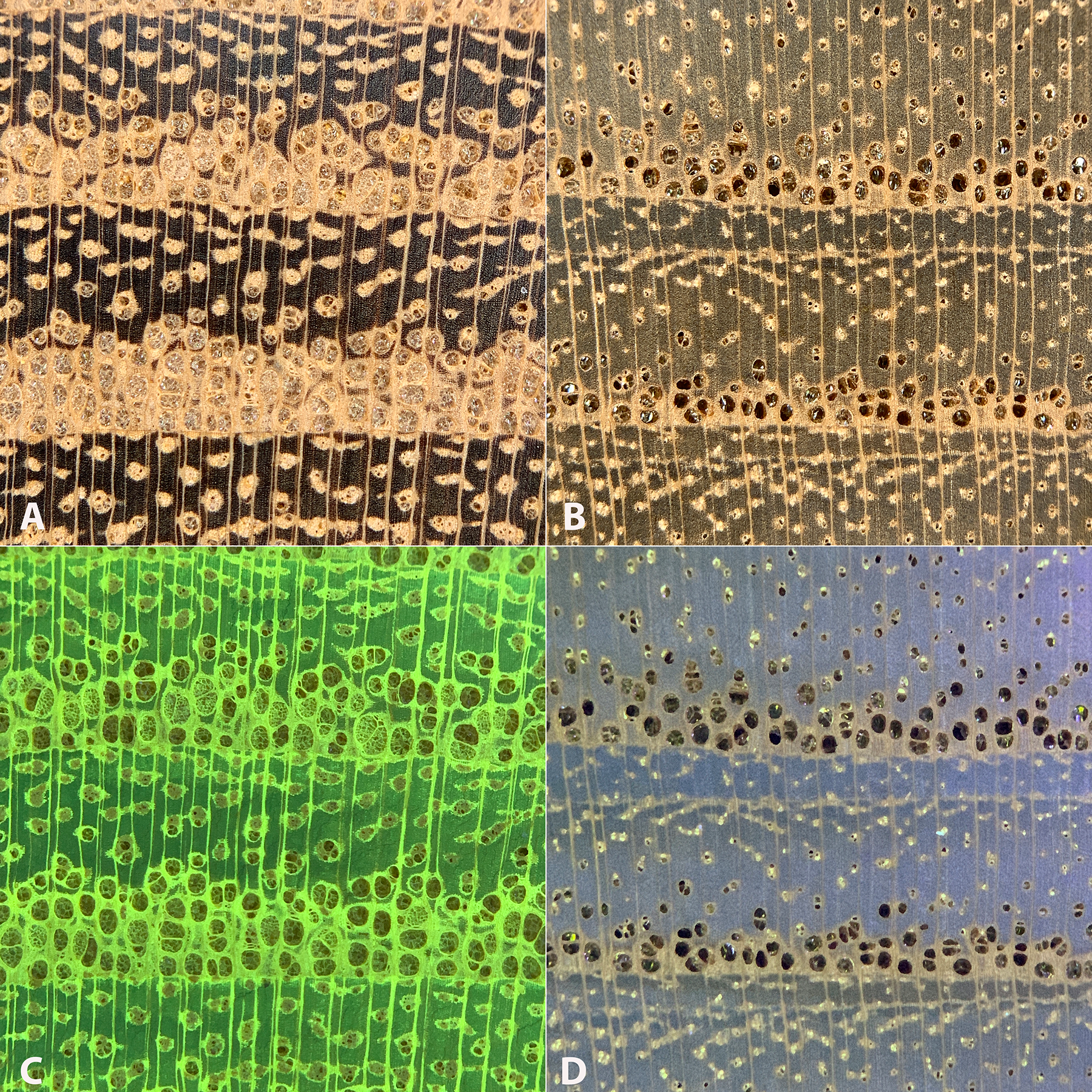
XyloPhone images of Robinia pseudoacacia (A, C) and Morus rubra (B, D) illuminated with visible light (A, B) and UV light (C, D). Note the clear yellow-green fluorescence of Robinia in C.

The cost for a XyloTron unit is too high for many field deployment/inspection contexts. To address this cost concern, the Forest Products Laboratory developed a smartphone complement to the XyloTron, the XyloPhone. The XyloPhone unit is attached to a smartphone by a model-specific slide-on adapter that centers the XyloPhone unit over the phone’s built-in, high-resolution camera. By leveraging the comparative ubiquity of smartphones and by sourcing much lower-cost components (for example, the lens from a magnifying loupe rather than an expensive scientific lens) the price-point for a XyloPhone was less than one-twelfth that of a XyloTron. The XyloPhone design also incorporates white-light and UV illumination but lacks the ability to reposition the lighting array for charcoal identification.

== Other uses ==
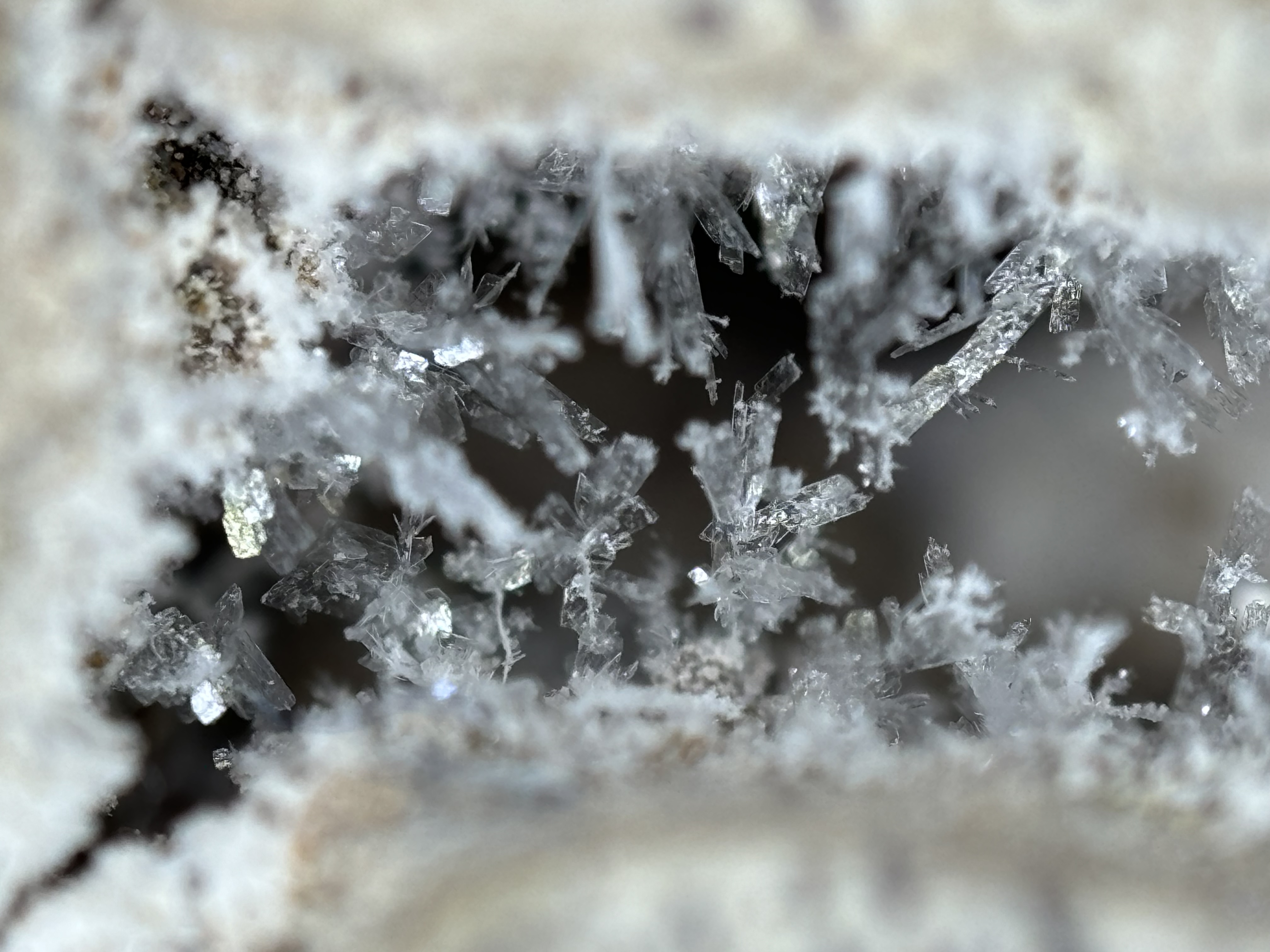
Organic crystals efflorescing from Sequoia sempervirens. With the naked eye, these crystals appear as white dust or powder.

The XyloTron and XyloPhone were primarily intended to facilitate rapid macroscopic identification of wood, but both systems are suited to capture images of any objects that show interesting macroscopic variation, from fungi to feathers to fabrics to fuzzy leaves – or anything else one cares to examine.

== See also ==
- Illegal logging
- Wood anatomy
- Forest governance
- Timber mafia
