= Yakisugi =

Traditional Japanese wood preservation technique

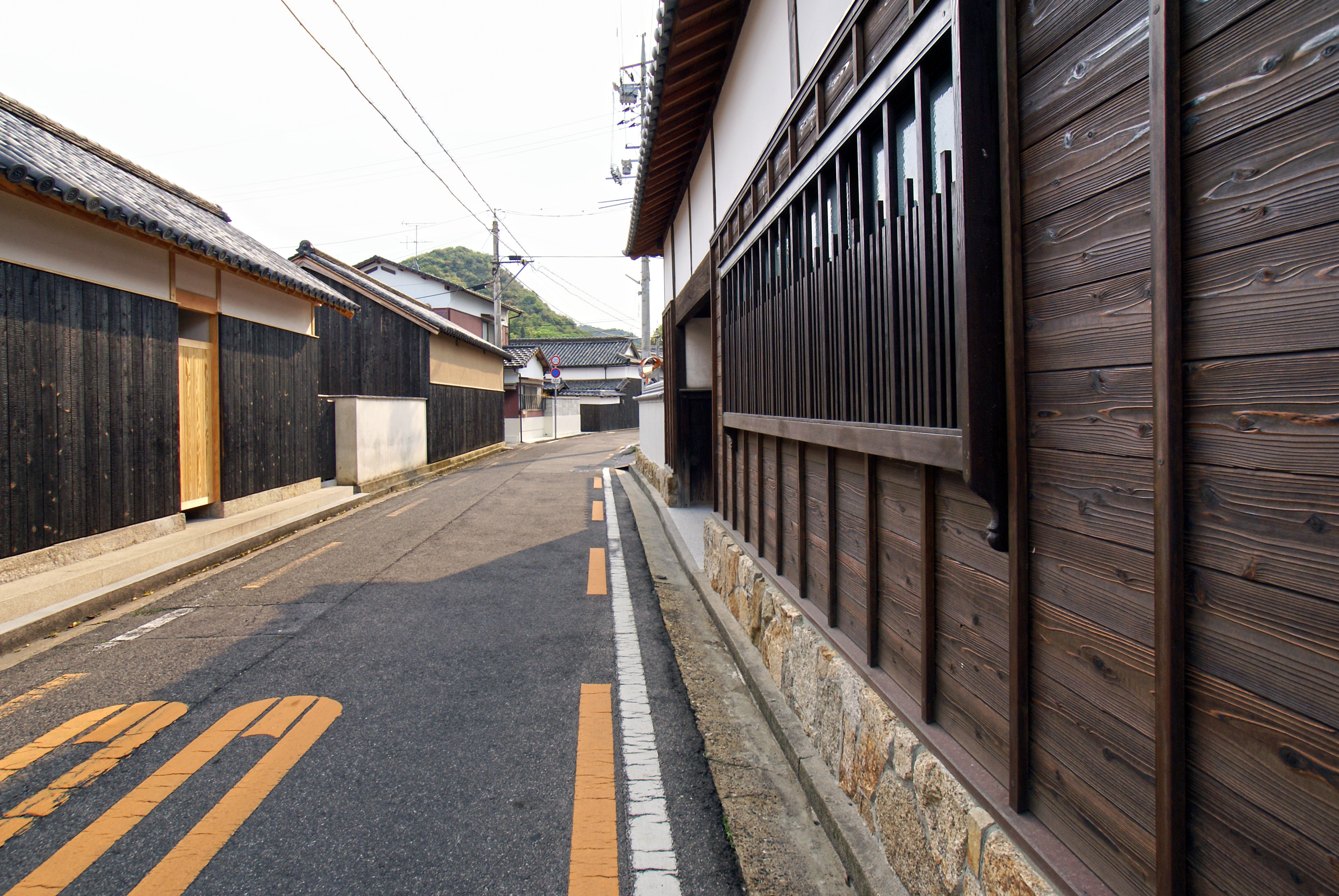
Traditional houses in Naoshima, Kagawa clad with yakisugi panels

Yakisugi (Japanese: 焼 杉, lit. 'burnt Japanese cedar ') is a traditional Japanese method of wood preservation. It is also referred to as shō sugi ban (焼杉板), a term which uses the same kanji characters, but an alternative pronunciation. The ban character means "plank". In English it is known as burnt timber cladding.

== Process and properties ==
By partially charring the surface of the wood without combusting the entire piece, the surface becomes water-resistant through carbonization, and its hygroscopy is reduced due to chemical cellular changes during the carbonization process, which results in increased durability. It additionally protects the wood against insects, fungi and mold, as well as making the wood more fire-resistant. This traditional technique has several similarities with the modern thermal wood modification methods used in Europe and elsewhere.

However, some studies have shown that surface charring alone does not improve its durability or its resistance to fire or water.

== Contemporary applications ==
Contemporary architect Terunobu Fujimori employs yakisugi in his designs. Japanese architect Kengo Kuma also incorporates this charred wood material in his architectural works.

== Gallery ==
=== In detail ===
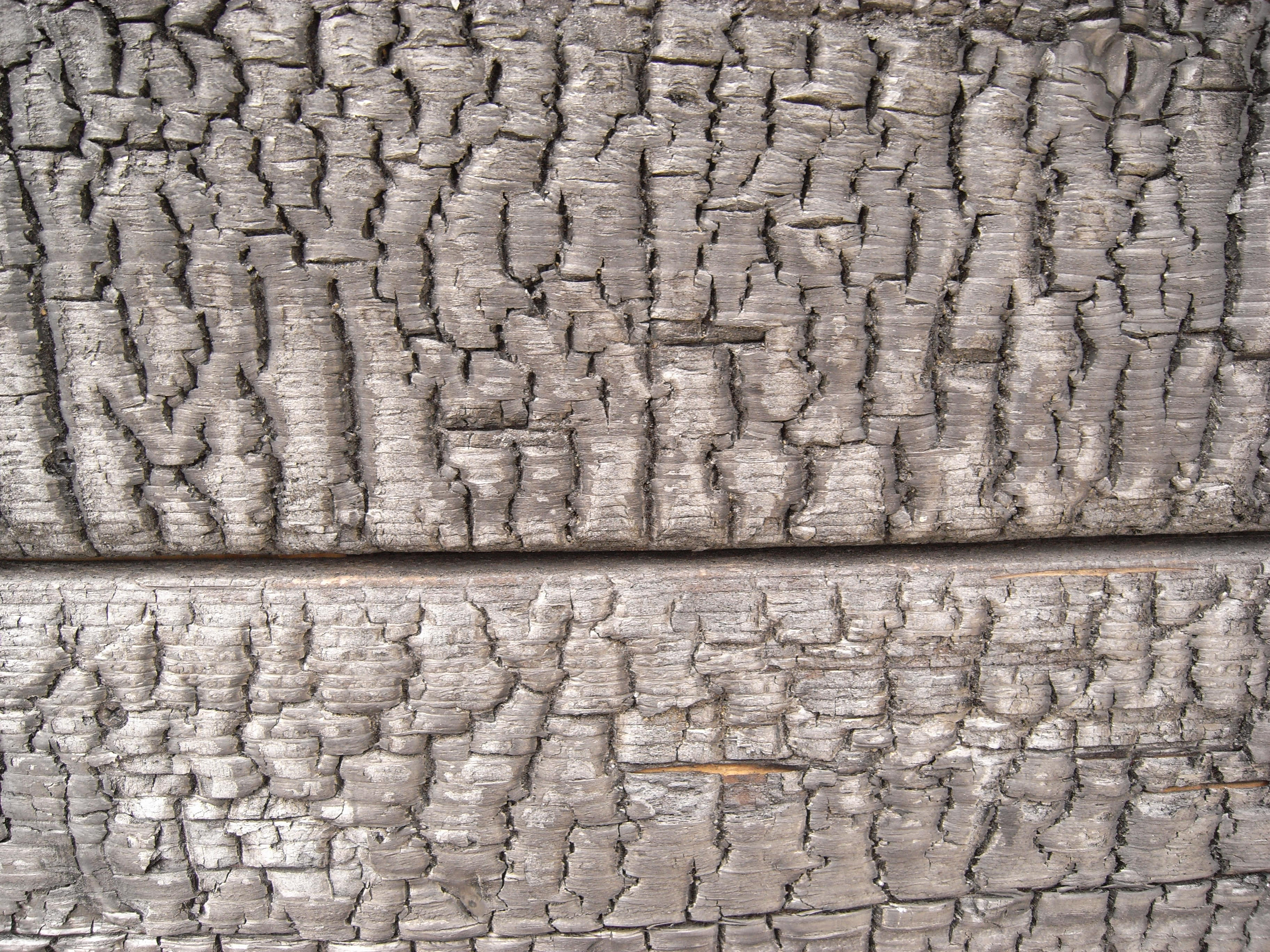
Surface detail showing charred texture

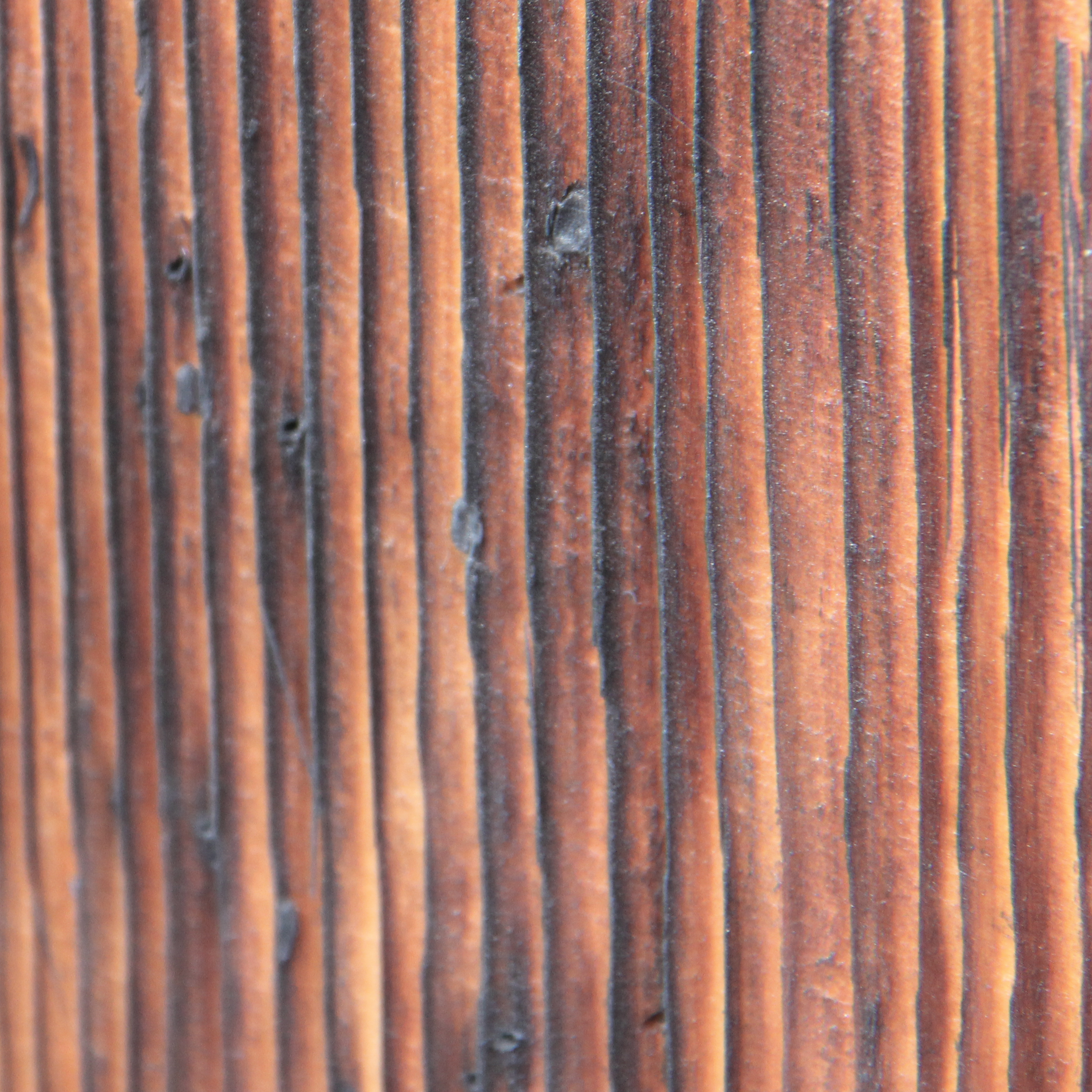
Close-up of yakisugi surface pattern

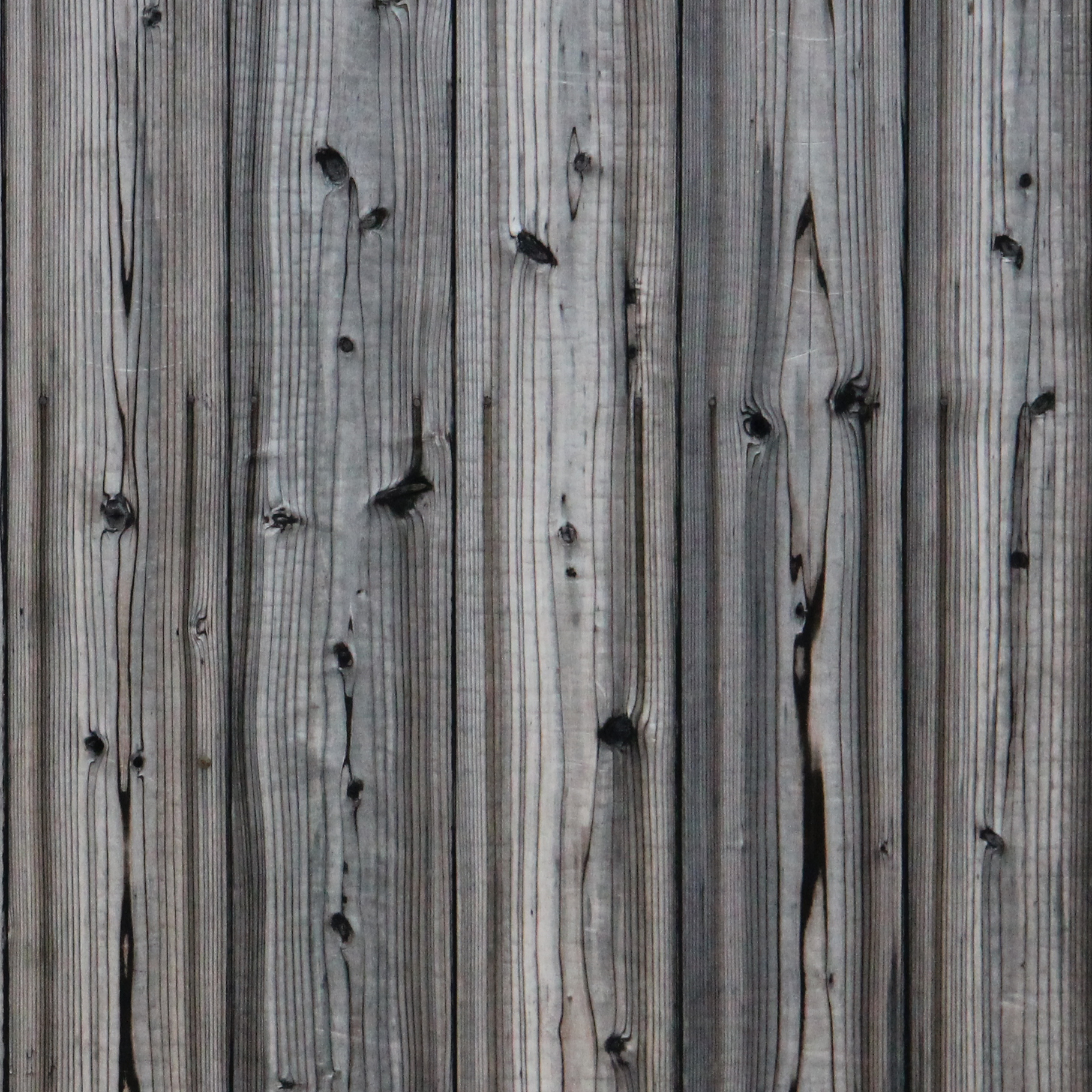
Yakisugi texture detail from Kyoto

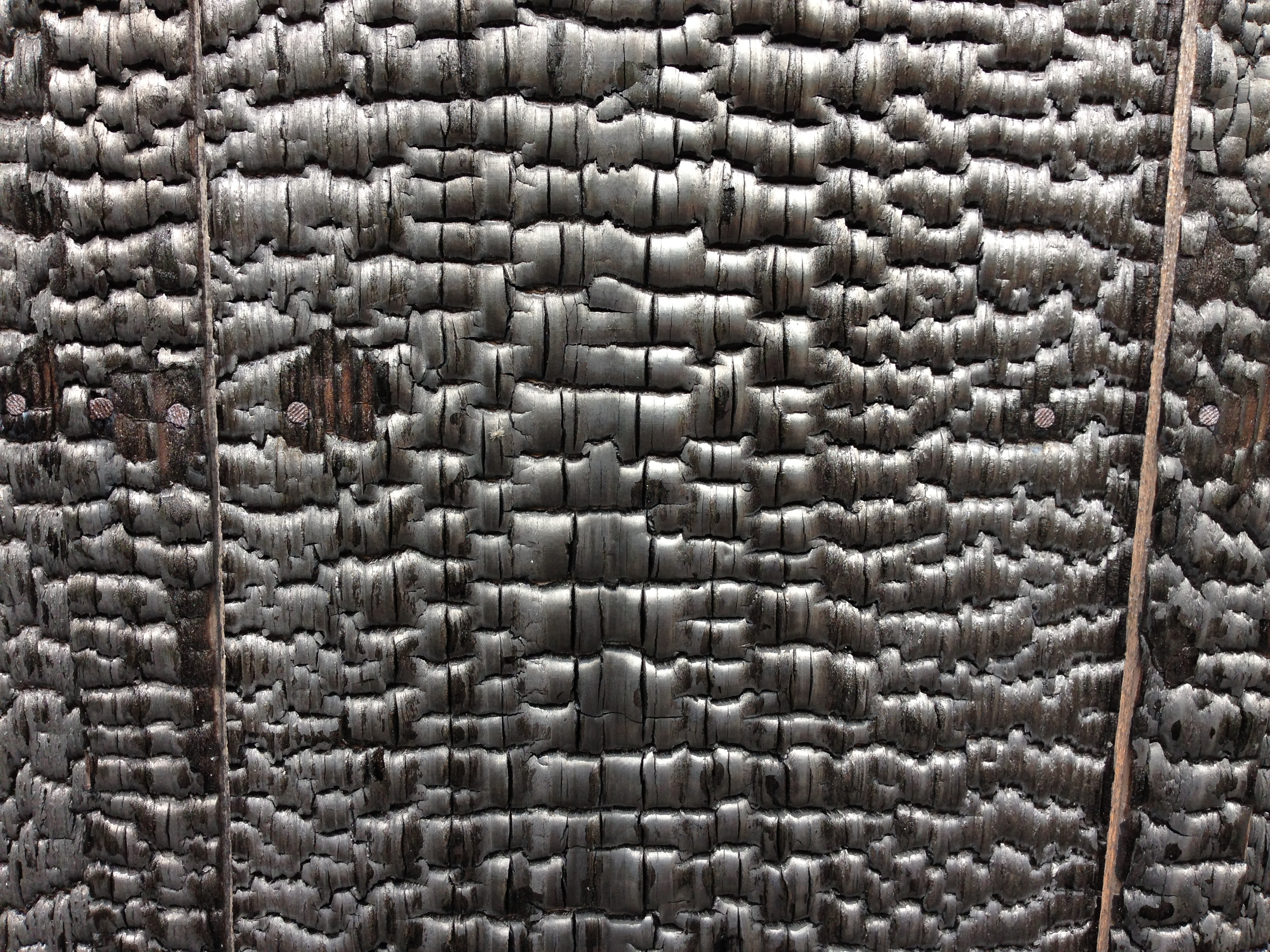
Charred wood surface showing carbonization

=== In use ===
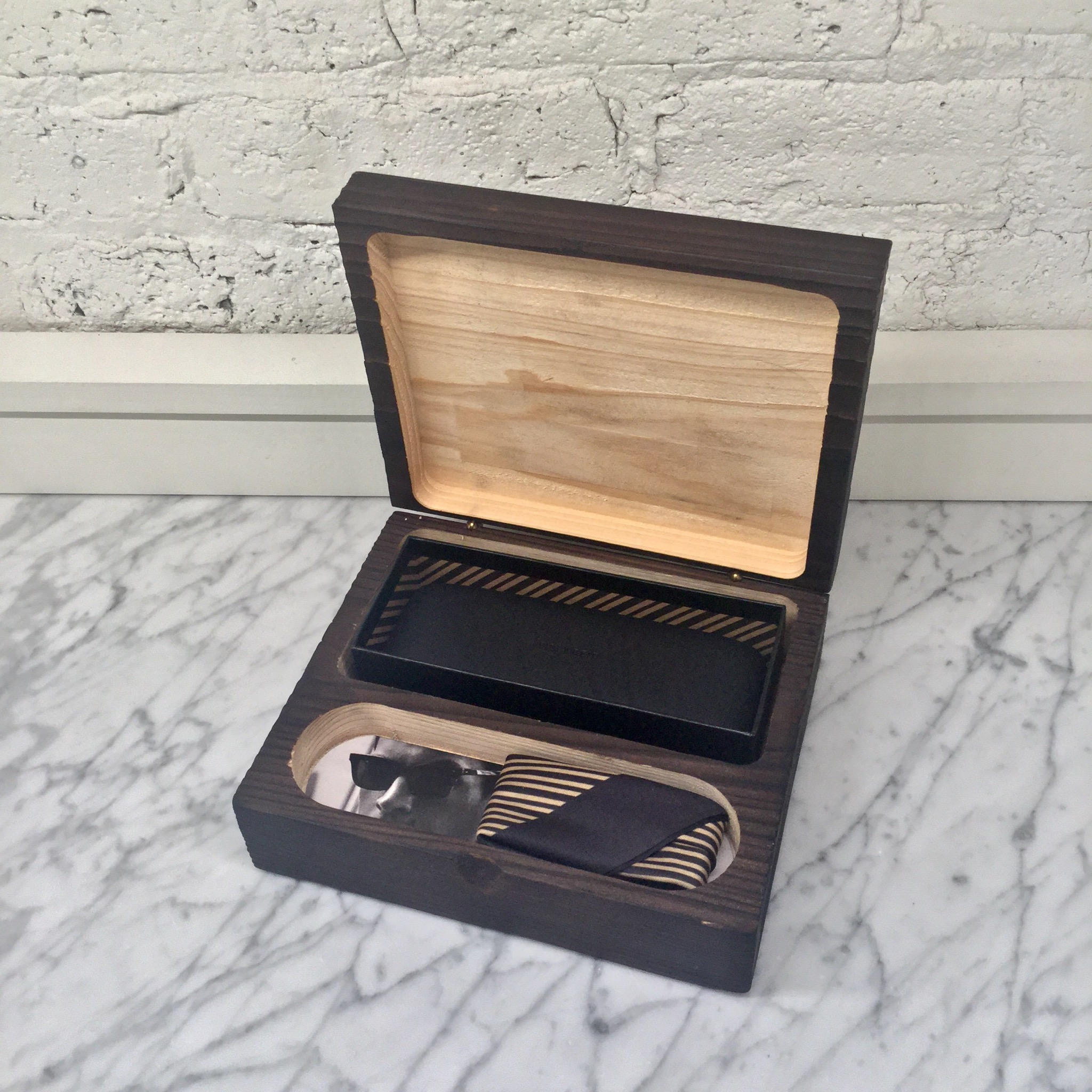
Yakisugi treated wood used in a box for sunglasses

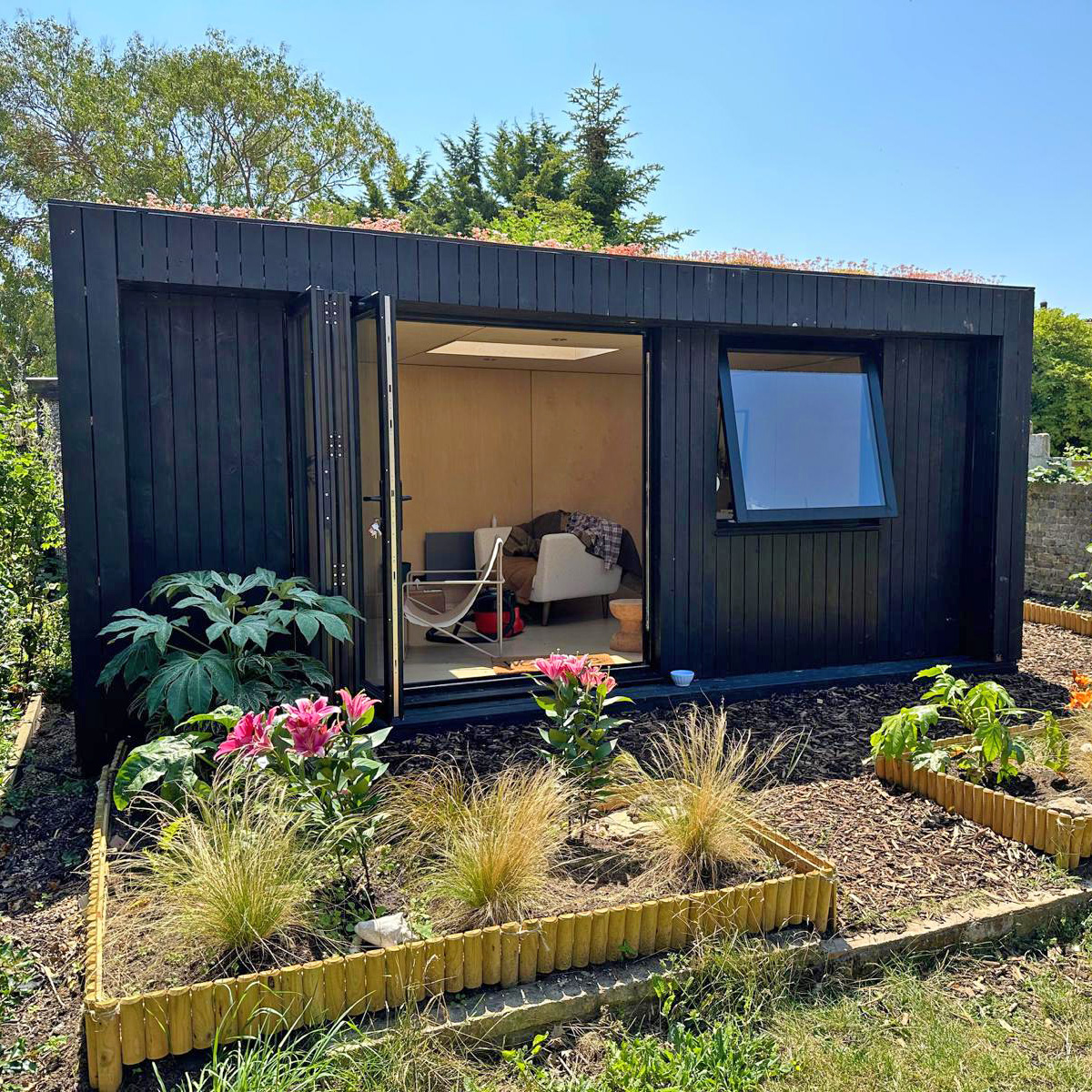
Western garden room with yakisugi cladding
