= Torrefaction =

Thermochemical process

Torrefaction removes moisture and volatiles from biomass, leaving bio-coal.

Torrefaction of biomass, e.g., wood or grain, is a mild form of pyrolysis at temperatures typically between 200 and 320 °C. Torrefaction changes biomass properties to provide a better fuel quality for combustion and gasification applications. Torrefaction produces a relatively dry product, which reduces or eliminates its potential for organic decomposition. Torrefaction combined with densification creates an energy-dense fuel carrier of 20 to 21 GJ/ton lower heating value (LHV). Torrefaction causes the material to undergo Maillard reactions. Torrefied biomass can be used as an energy carrier or as a feedstock used in the production of bio-based fuels and chemicals.

Biomass can be an important energy source. However, there exists a large diversity of potential biomass sources, each with its own unique characteristics. To create efficient biomass-to-energy chains, torrefaction of biomass, combined with densification (pelletisation or briquetting), is a promising step towards overcoming the logistical challenges in developing large-scale sustainable energy solutions, by making it easier to transport and store. Pellets or briquettes have higher density, contain less moisture, and are more stable in storage than the biomass they are derived from.

== Process ==
Torrefaction is a thermochemical treatment of biomass at 200 to 320 °C (392 to 608 °F). It is carried out under atmospheric pressure and in the absence of oxygen. During the torrefaction process, the water contained in the biomass as well as superfluous volatiles are released, and the biopolymers (cellulose, hemicellulose and lignin) partly decompose, giving off various types of volatiles. The final product is the remaining solid, dry, blackened material that is referred to as torrefied biomass or bio-coal.

During the process, the biomass typically loses 20% of its mass (bone dry basis) and 10% of its heating value, with no appreciable change in volume. This energy (the volatiles) can be used as a heating fuel for the torrefaction process. After the biomass is torrefied it can be densified, usually into briquettes or pellets using conventional densification equipment, to increase its mass and energy density and to improve its hydrophobic properties. The final product may repel water and thus can be stored in moist air or rain without appreciable change in moisture content or heating value, unlike the original biomass.

The history of torrefaction dates to the beginning of the 19th century, and gasifiers were used on a large scale during the Second World War.

== Added value of torrefied biomass ==
Torrefied and densified biomass has several advantages in different markets, which makes it a competitive option compared to conventional biomass wood pellets.

=== Higher energy density ===
An energy density of 18–20 GJ/m^{3} – compared to the 19–24 GJ/m^{3} heat content of natural anthracite coal – can be achieved when combined with densification (pelletizing or briquetting) compared to values of 10–11 GJ/m^{3} for raw biomass, driving a 40–50% reduction in transportation costs. Importantly, pelletizing or briquetting primarily increases energy density. Torrefaction alone typically decreases energy density, though it makes the material easier to make into pellets or briquettes.

=== More homogeneous composition ===
Torrefied biomass can be produced from a wide variety of raw biomass feedstocks that yield similar product properties. Most woody and herbaceous biomass consists of three main polymeric structures: cellulose, hemicellulose and lignin. Together these are called lignocellulose. Torrefaction primarily drives moisture and oxygen-rich and hydrogen-rich functional groups from these structures, producing similar char-like structures in all three cases. Therefore, most biomass fuels, regardless of origin, produce torrefied products with similar properties – with the exception of ash properties, which largely reflect the original fuel ash content and composition.

=== Hydrophobic behavior ===
Torrefied biomass has hydrophobic properties, i.e., repels water, and when combined with densification make bulk storage in open air feasible.

=== Elimination of biological activity ===
All biological activity is stopped, reducing the risk of fire and stopping biological decomposition like rotting.

=== Improved grindability ===
Torrefaction of biomass leads to improved grindability of biomass. This leads to more efficient co-firing in existing coal-fired power stations or entrained-flow gasification for the production of chemicals and transportation fuels.

== Markets for torrefied biomass ==
Torrefied biomass has added value for different markets. Biomass in general provides a low-cost, low-risk route to lower CO_{2}-emissions. When high volumes are needed, torrefaction can make biomass from distant sources price competitive because the denser material is easier to store and transport.

Wood powder fuel:

- Torrefied wood powder can be ground into a fine powder and when compressed, mimics liquefied petroleum gas (LPG).

Large-scale co-firing in coal-fired power plants:

- Torrefied biomass results in lower handling costs;
- Torrefied biomass enables higher co-firing rates;
- Product can be delivered in a range of LHVs (20–25 GJ/ton) and sizes (briquette, pellet).
- Co-firing torrefied biomass with coal leads to reduction in net power plant emissions.

Steel production:

- Fibrous biomass is very difficult to deploy in furnaces;
- To replace coal injection, biomass product needs to have LHV of more than 25 GJ/ton. Biochar can be added to the torrefied biomass to enhance the LHV.

Residential/decentralized heating:

- Relatively high percentage of transport on wheels in the supply chain makes biomass expensive. Increasing volumetric energy density does decrease costs;
- Limited storage space increases need for increased volumetric density;
- Moisture content important as moisture leads to smoke and smell.

Biomass-to-Liquids:

- Torrefied biomass results in lower handling costs.
- Torrefied biomass serves as a 'clean' feedstock for production of transportation fuels (Fischer–Tropsch process), which saves on production costs.

Miscellaneous uses:

- Several guitar builders have used torrefaction to obtain more dimensionally stable wood for guitar parts than traditional kiln-drying or air-drying provides, including Yamaha, Martin, Gibson, and luthier Dana Bourgeois.

== See also ==
- Pyrolysis
- Thermally modified wood
- Carbonization
- Miscanthus giganteus § Transport and combustion challenges (contains a detailed description of the inferior combustion qualities of biomass compared to coal, and the positive effects of torrefaction.)
