= Furfurylated wood =

Type of modified wood that is treated with furfuryl alcohol

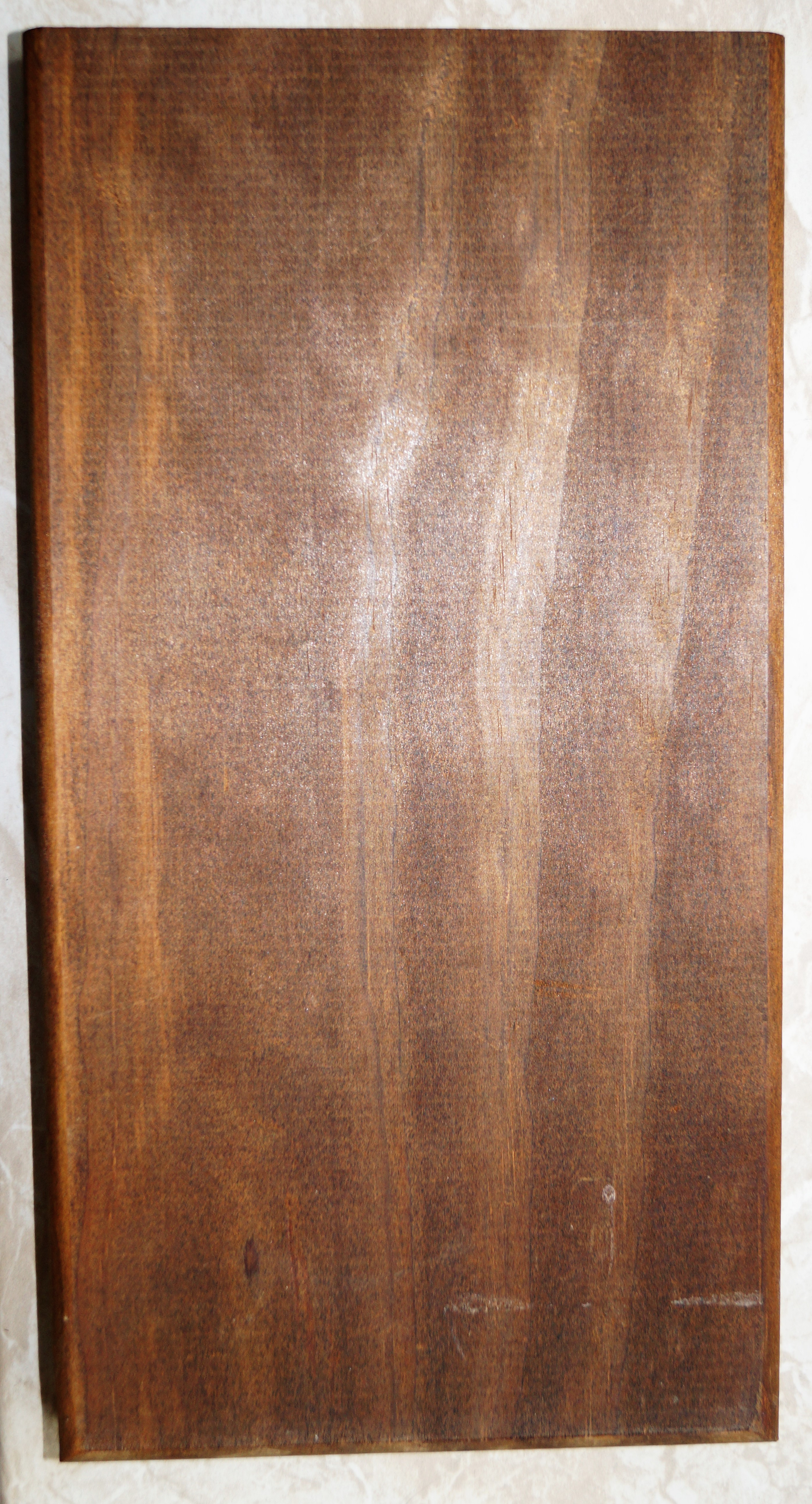
Example of furfurylated pine wood with a loading level of 30–35%)

Furfurylated wood is the end product of treating wood with furfuryl alcohol. This chemical process is also called furfurylation. Furfurylation is a commercially used wood modification process to enhance the physical, mechanical and biological properties of wood. In this process -which is based on principles of wood science- the cell walls of the wood swell with furfuryl alcohol, which polymerizes within the cell walls. This treatment reduces the water absorption capacity of the wood, thus minimizing its tendency to deform with changes in moisture. The hardness and rot resistance of the modified wood are also improved compared to natural, untreated wood. The furfuryl alcohol used is obtained through the hydrogenation of furfural from biological agriwaste residues, such as husks and bagasse.

== Process ==
In the furfurylation process, the walls of woody cells are initially swollen with the furfuryl-alcohol-based solution. Due to its polarity and size, furfuryl alcohol penetrates the cell wall. The polymerization of furfuryl alcohol in wood is a complex reaction whose processes are not fully understood. It is not clear whether furfuryl alcohol reacts and polymerizes only with itself within the cell or if it also reacts with cell wall components such as cellulose or lignin. The polymerized furfuryl alcohol within the cell makes the wood highly hydrophobic.

== History ==
The furfurylation of wood is a process that first initiated and explored by Alfred J. Stamm in the 1950s in the United States, but widespread adoption in the market has been limited so far. The first industrial production of furfurylated wood in the USA began in the 1960s. In the 1980s, a two-stage process was developed by a research group led by Professor Marc Schneider in Canada. The wood was first treated with a catalyst and then soaked with furfuryl alcohol. However, the high cost of the two-stage impregnation prevented the production of furfurylated wood at market-demanded prices. In 1997, Wood Polymer Technologies ASA in Norway was founded in an attempt to build a pilot plant for a single stage production process. From 2000 onwards, furfurylated wood has been marketed in the US and Europe. In 2004, the production capacity in Porsgrunn, Norway, was 3,000 m^{3} per year. By 2008, the capacity had increased to 25,000 m^{3} per year.

== Production ==
To produce furfurylated wood the following steps are necessary:

1. Storage and mixing of impregnation solution: Approximately 40% furfuryl alcohol, water, polymerization initiators, catalysts, and surfactants are mixed and then poured into a storage tank.
2. Impregnation: The wood is soaked in a pressure vessel in a three-stage process. First, a vacuum is applied to remove the remaining air from the wood. In the second step, the wood is soaked with the impregnation solution at pressures around 13 bar. Step three involves a short relaxation phase, during which the vessel is brought to ambient pressure. The entire vacuum vessel can be tilted by 5° to allow excess impregnation solution to drain off the boards.
3. Drying and polymerization: The soaked wood is dried in vacuum dryers through direct heating with steam. Due to the high boiling point of furfuryl alcohol (170 °C), it is possible to first dry the water from the wood and then carry out polymerization at a second higher temperature stage. The condensate produced during drying is returned to the impregnation solution for further use.
4. Post-drying: The modified wood is post-dried at moderate temperatures to minimize emissions and set the final moisture content.

For the production of furfurylated timber, mostly Radiata pine (Pinus radiata) wood originating from Oceania is used; other wood species used include Southern Yellow Pine from the US, and maple.

== Properties ==
The properties of the modified wood strongly depend on the amount and concentration of furfuryl alcohol introduced. The introduction amount of furfuryl alcohol can be controlled by the proportion of furfuryl alcohol in an aqueous impregnation solution. Thus, it is possible to adjust the properties of the modified wood.

At a loading level of 30–35%, the hardness, weight, mechanical properties, dimensional stability, and resistance to insects, fungi, and chemicals increase to the extent that the product is classified in durability class 1. Due to the process, the wood darkens significantly, especially at high levels of furfuryl alcohol. Therefore, it is traded and used as a substitute for tropical timber, both in terms of properties and colour. The only drawback of highly modified wood is an increase in wood brittleness.

Even at a low loading level, the mechanical properties of the wood improve, but resistance to pests such as fungi and insects is not guaranteed, and the dark discolouration of the wood is less pronounced. Therefore, lightly modified wood is used indoors, mainly as flooring.

At a loading level of 50%, high resistance to maritime ship borers, such as shipworms (Teredo navalis), is achieved.

Furfurylated wood, holding the Scandinavian ecological label Swan, is today traded as an environmentally friendly product since both the wood and furfuryl alcohol are produced from renewable raw materials.

In recent years, attempts to make furfurylated wood as a fire resistant material, have been made.

== Market ==
Currently, there is only one manufacturer of furfurylated wood, named Kebony based in Oslo, Norway. This company produces 22,000 m^{3} of furfurylated wood. The operation has capacities for at least 25,000 m^{3}. A new production plant has been built in Belgium in 2021, and the total production has been increased.
