= Forest Products Laboratory =

National research laboratory of the United States Forest Service

Coordinates: 43°04′28.8″N 89°25′38.9″W

USDA Forest Products Laboratory
- Logo of the US Forest Service.

Agency overview
- Formed: June 4, 1910
- Jurisdiction: Federal Government of the United States
- Headquarters: 1 Gifford Pinchot Drive, Madison, WI 53726
- Agency executive: Dr. Cynthia West, Director
- Parent agency: US Department of Agriculture United States Forest Service
- Website: www.fpl.fs.usda.gov @fsWoodLab

The Forest Products Laboratory (FPL) is the national research laboratory of the United States Forest Service, which is part of USDA. Since its opening in 1910, the FPL has provided scientific research on wood, wood products and their commercial uses in partnership with academia, industry, tribal, state, local and other government agencies. The laboratory is headquartered in Madison, Wisconsin. The focus of the Forest Products Laboratory is to promote healthy forests and forest-based economies through the efficient, sustainable use of the Nation's wood resources.

== History ==
By the late 1800s, awareness was growing that timber resources were finite and careful use could extend them. In 1887 B.E. Fernow, chief of the Division of Forestry in the Department of Agriculture reported:

The properties upon which the use of wood, its technology, are based, should be well known to the forest manager if he wishes to produce a crop of given quality useful for definite purposes. Our ignorance of this direction has been most fruitful in fostering a wasteful use of our natural forests, and the same ignorance misleads even the forest planter of today in choosing the timber he plants and the locality to which he adapts it. How the Black Walnut has been sacrificed for fence material, how the valuable Chestnut Oak has rotted in the forests unused, how the Hemlock has been despised and passed by when it might have been successfully used to lengthen the duration of White Pine supplies, how timbers are now used in unnecessarily large sizes and applied to uses for which they are not adapted, while other timbers are neglected for uses for which they are adapted --- all these unfortunate misapplications are or have been due to lack of knowledge of the technological properties of our timbers.

Between 1890 and 1910 research into timber management and reforestation was scattered across various U.S. universities. Research into the mechanical properties of various woods was done at Purdue and universities in Washington, California, Oregon and Colorado. Yale hosted studies on preservation and kiln drying. An experimental pulp mill was at Boston, along with studies of wood chemistry and preservation.

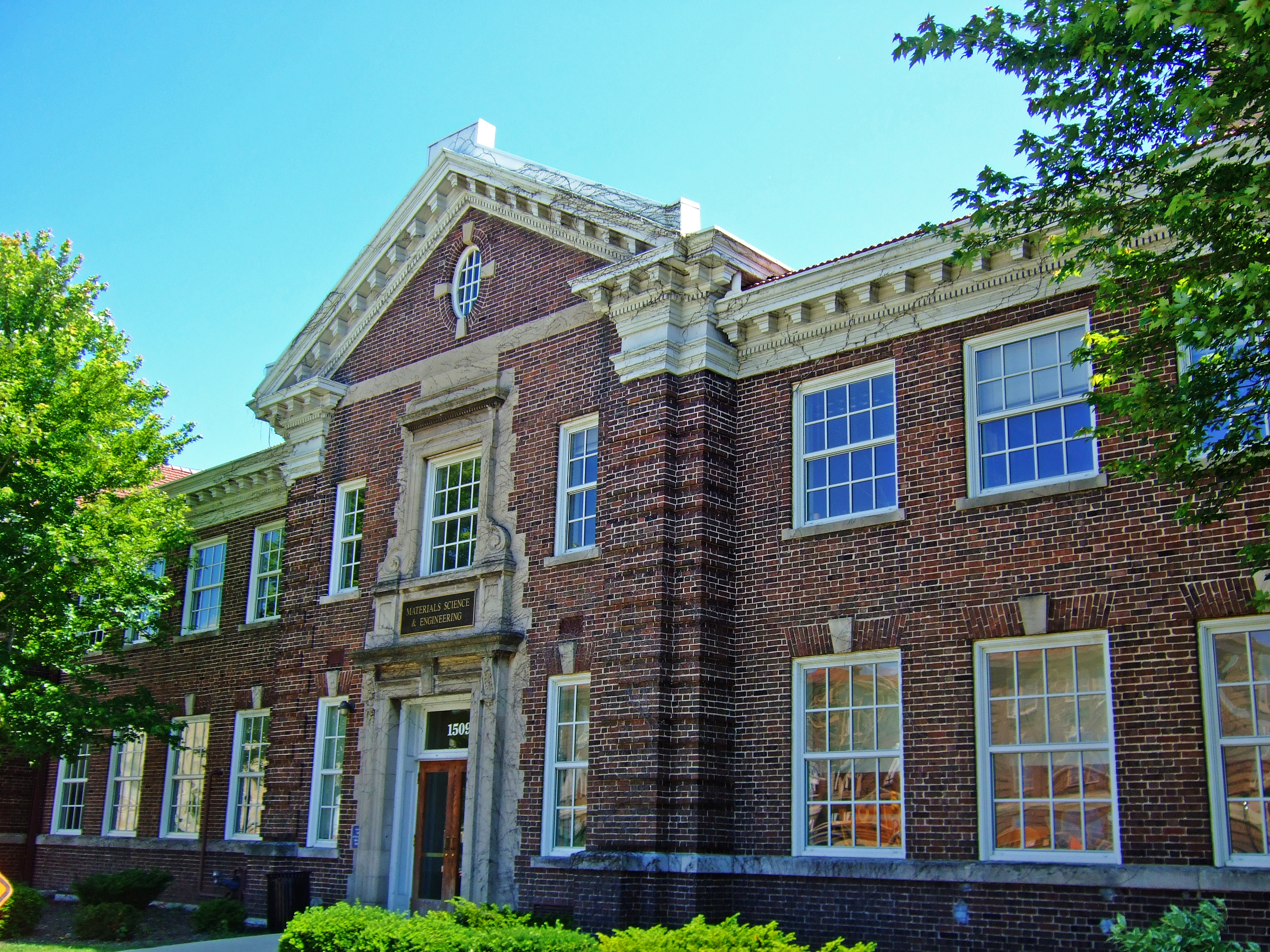
The old Forest Products Laboratory (1910) on the University of Wisconsin-Madison campus, at 1509 University Avenue, is also listed on the National Register of Historic Places.

The Forest Products Laboratory was conceived of in 1907 by McGarvey Cline, chief of the U.S. Forest Service Office of Wood Utilization. Cline saw the need for a centralized research facility in order to improve coordination among regional research centers. Along with Forest Service Chief Gifford Pinchot, Cline selected the University of Wisconsin campus as the site for this new laboratory because Madison had good access to rail lines, was close to timber resources, and the UW had a good reputation for scientific research.

In 1910 the Forest Products building at 1509 University Avenue (now Materials Science and Engineering Building) was completed, housing 45 researchers in eight divisions: Timber Physics, Timber Testing, Pulp and Paper, Wood Preservation, Wood Chemistry, Wood Distillation, Wood Engineering, and Pathology. Raphael Zon's advocacy of research led to the organization of the first Federal Forest Experiment Stations and the Forest Products Laboratory under the Branch of Research, which was formed in 1915.

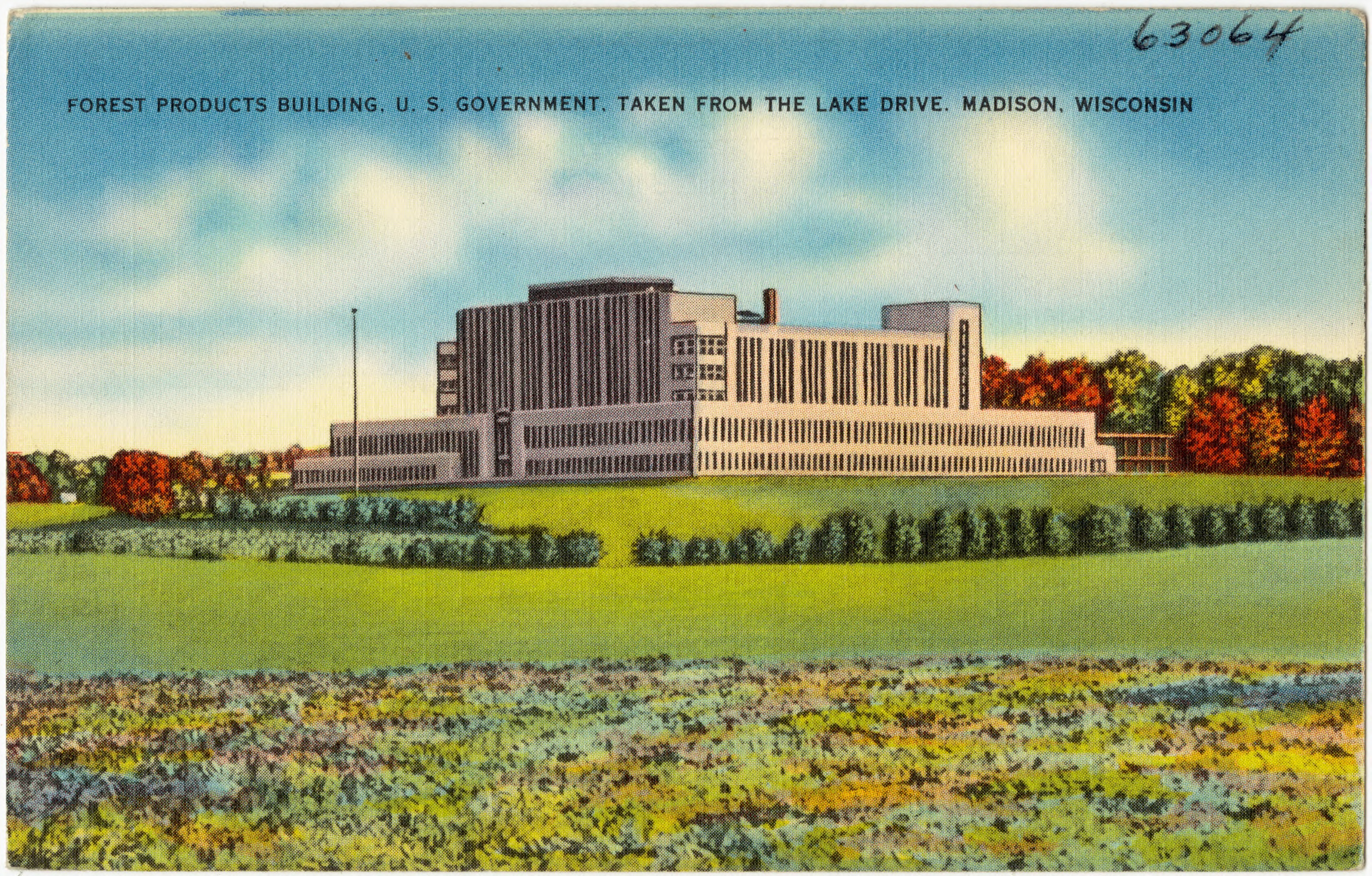
The new Laboratory location, illustrated between the 1930s and 40s

The lab's work grew and in 1919 there was already a proposal for a new facility. It was finally funded in 1928. The UW provided 10 acres (4.0 ha) on the west end of campus and the Forest Service built the new lab in 1931 and 1932. The building was designed by Holabird and Root of Chicago in International Style, reflected in the absence of ornament, the ribbon windows, and the corner windows. The building's footprint is U-shaped, with the central block six stories tall. Inside, the lobby floor is terrazzo and the doors and wood trim are stained and varnished American Walnut. The second floor is trimmed in white and red oak, the third in chestnut, the fourth in clear birch, and the fifth in redgum. Low annexes were added to the main lab building in 1935 and in the 1950s, and various detached outbuildings have been added over the years, like the 1934 Fire Test Building.

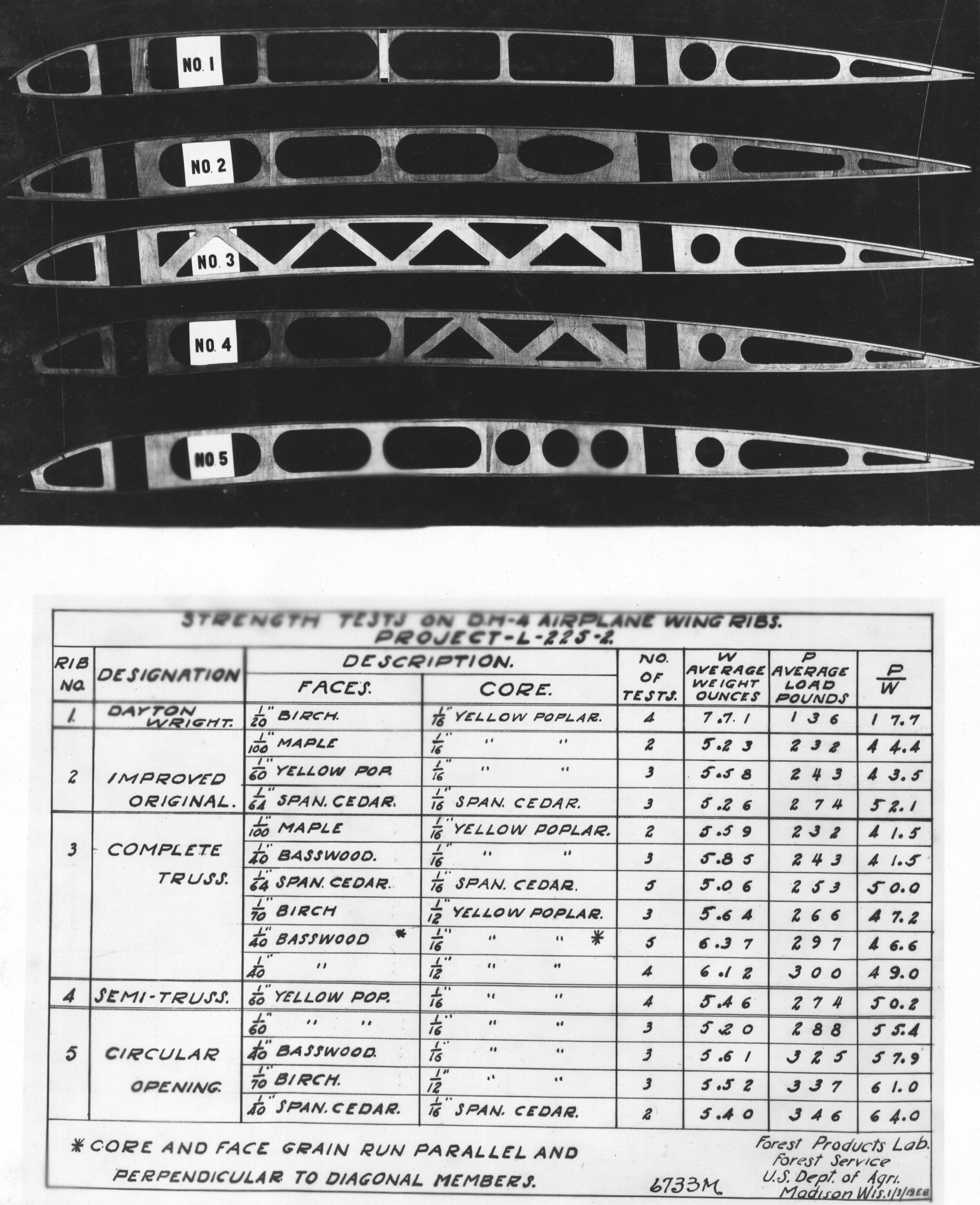
Results of strength tests for different designs of a DeHaviland wing rib during World War I.

Research at the FPL has improved quality of life for nearly every American by facilitating breakthroughs in housing, packaging, recycling, and conservation of forest resources. Specifically, researchers at the FPL developed particle board, glued laminated wood, the laminated arch, pulp paper processes, and fiberboard boxes, and wood crates. The FPL has also made numerous important contributions to the country during its history, including crucial research for the armed forces during times of war.

== Overview ==
The mission of the Forest Products Laboratory is to identify and conduct innovative wood and fiber utilization research that contributes to conservation and productivity of the forest resource, thereby sustaining forests, the economy, and quality of life. The FPL is organized into seven primary Research Work Units. These units utilize the testing resources of several laboratories and informational repositories located within numerous FPL campus facilities. Five primary Areas of Focus are the center of all FPL research. Collaboration on this research takes place with various other Federal agencies; state, local, and tribal governments; private industry and academic institutions.

=== Research Emphasis Areas ===
- Underutilized Woody Biomass: Forests in the United States contain a significant amount of small-diameter and underutilized woody biomass. Overstocked stands of trees increase the risk of catastrophic wildfires and damage due to insects, disease, and drought. Thinning these stands can help reduce risks but can be very costly and may exceed the value of the biomass being removed. The commercial use of thinning material creates a market for value-added products and is one way to improve the economics of thinning operations aimed at improving forest health. Since 1993, the Forest Products Laboratory (FPL) has focused some of its many research efforts on characterizing and identifying potential uses for small-diameter and thinning material. FPL researchers also provide technology to help rural communities create successful businesses from the by-products of ecosystem management. Some projects have explored the potential of "in the round" form small-diameter structural material for uses in bridges, boardwalks, trail structures, picnic shelters, storage sheds, and other rustic-type buildings.
- Nanotechnology: Nanotechnology research presents great potential for improved wood product performance and serviceability. As such, the FPL is poised to be the preeminent Federal facility for the application of nano-science in forest products research. Potential nanotech applications include wood composite materials with embedded nanosensors to measure and react to structural forces, loads, moisture, and temperatures. Nano-enabled antimicrobial and water resistant coatings on lumber for use in flood-prone areas and hurricane zones could improve health, safety, and wood resiliency in these areas. The development of high-value products from undervalued wood resources using cellulose nanocrystals and nanofibrilated cellulose components can also improve the performance and durability of fiberboard, particleboard, and glued structural products for use in a wide array of structural applications.
- Forest Biorefinery and Biomass Utilization: The FPL is well-placed to pursue research opportunities to improve the economics of producing transportation fuel, bioenergy, and chemicals from woody biomass. Development of profitable biorefineries helps lower the cost of forest management, improves forest health, advances sustainable forest management practices, reduces dependence on fossil fuels, and decreases production of greenhouse gases. Decades of fire suppression have disrupted the natural fire cycle of U.S. forests, resulting in an estimated 8.4 billion dry tons of material that needs to be removed from the National Forests to improve their resiliency. This material is available for production of wood products, chemicals, and energy, yet profitable uses for the material are needed to reduce the costs of forest management. Business concepts that focus on converting wood resources into liquid fuels and chemical feedstock are becoming cost competitive. As international concerns over global warming and greenhouse gas generation rise, governmental support for biofuels is increasing and likely reduces investment risks. Fuels derived from biomass are generally regarded as greenhouse gas neutral because the amount of carbon dioxide released on combustion equals the amount adsorbed from the atmosphere and sequestered by the plant through photosynthesis.
- Advanced Structures Research: In the past, structures were primarily designed based on life and safety issues. Today, structural design also includes functionality, environmental impact, and economics. Performance-based engineering encompasses these considerations in structural design and is gaining momentum with architects and engineers. Performance-based engineering implies design, evaluation, and construction of engineered facilities that meet uncertain future demands. The concepts require a shift away from empirical and experience-based conventions towards a design and assessment process more firmly rooted in accurate prediction of structural performance under a realistic description environmental loading factors that the structure experiences. This approach also emphasizes monitoring the health of the structural system, evaluating performance characteristics and identifying the need for renovation or new construction. It forms the foundation of strategies for revitalizing our decaying infrastructure.
- Advanced Composites: For decades, wood composite materials have been used to create value-added commodity building and home furnishing products (for example, plywood, particleboard, fiberboard, hardboard). More recently, biobased composite products based on natural fibers, and hybrid products, such as wood–plastic composites, have come on the market. New composite technologies, such as nano-enabled composites, are being developed as low-volume, high-value composites. Each of these technologies adds considerable value to diverse wood- and bio-fiber feedstocks, including small-diameter timber, plantation-grown timber, agricultural and industrial residues, exotic–invasive species, and demolition and recycled materials. Biobased composites are also an outlet for timber removals and thinning, which helps forest managers restore damaged ecosystems and promotes sustainable forest management practices. Recent advances in wood and biocomposite research have led to a new understanding between materials, process, and composite performance. Advances in engineered biocomposites impact a wide range of composite products, including economical commodity products and high-performance niche products.

=== Research Work Units ===
- Durability & Wood Protection: Improving durability and wood protection through improved building design, advances in low-toxicity wood preservatives, and improvements in fire safety.
- Economics & Statistics: Providing economic information, analysis, and projections and to enhance the efficiency of research through development, evaluation, and application of modern statistical research.
- Engineered Composites Sciences: Understanding relationships between materials, process, and performance to engineer biocomposites that benefit users while promoting sustainability of both virgin and recycled forest resources.
- Engineering Properties of Wood, Wood-based Materials & Structures: Improving the characterization of the mechanical and physical properties of wood and wood-based products that are important in engineering design and fostering their efficient use in wood building systems.
- Fiber & Chemical Sciences Research: Formulating efficient processes for converting wood to chemicals and fibers, developing economically viable uses for underutilized wood resources, and improving methods for recovering and reusing forest products such as waste paper and construction debris.
- Institute for Microbial & Biochemical Technology: Developing biotechnology and nanotechnology for wood and fiber conversion through research that contributes to efficient wood utilization and improved forest health.
- Forest Biopolymer Science & Engineering: Understanding the basic properties of wood and other materials used in conjunction with wood to improve their properties, enhance their service life, and develop new uses.

=== Laboratory Units ===
- Analytical Chemistry & Microscopy Laboratory (ACML): The ACML provides high-quality analytical support and technical consultation to FPL researchers using specialized equipment and capabilities, such as a nanoindenter, atomic force microscope and scanning electron microscope.
- Engineering Mechanics & Remote Sensing Laboratory (EMRSL): The EMRSL conducts physical and mechanical tests on a wide range of materials, building systems, and structures for use in the development of building codes and structural design. Testing of products and structures can involve samples ranging in size from toothpicks to full structural beams to three-dimensional building mock-ups.
- Paper Test Laboratory: The Paper Test Laboratory focuses mainly on analyzing printing and writing grades of paper. Researchers are able to address most paper testing needs regarding strength, optical, and surface properties. Testing is conducted in a tightly controlled humidity room for optimum accuracy.

=== Resources & Technical Assistance ===
- Center for Wood Anatomy Research: The Center for Wood Anatomy Research at FPL is home to the world's largest research wood collection. Over 100,000 samples are used for research and identification purposes. Researchers study anatomical and other characteristics of wood that may affect their utilization potential, provide wood identification services, and answer questions concerning the properties, characteristics, and uses of tropical and obscure native species.
- Center for Forest Mycology Research: The Center for Mycology Research maintains a herbarium containing 70,000 dried specimens of decay fungi collected since the early 1900s, as well as a collection of more than 12,000 living cultures. Samples from these collections are used by researchers around the world to further their studies. While located at FPL, the Center for Forest Mycology Research is officially a unit of the Forest Service's Northern Research Station.
- Technology Marketing Unit: Located at FPL, the USDA Forest Service State and Private Forestry's Technology Marketing Unit (TMU) provides a broad scope of expertise in wood products utilization and marketing, technology transfer, and technical assistance. The TMU works in collaboration with many different partners to ensure ready adoption of forest-based material technologies to many small, rural forest products businesses. The breadth of their work includes forest products conservation, processing, manufacturing efficiency, marketing, recycling, and bioenergy. The technical assistance they provide includes publications, technical assistance visits, conferences, workshops, meetings, and one-on-one consultations over the phone or in person. The TMU also manages and awards annual grants dedicated to helping improve the utilization of woody biomass removed from forest restoration projects.
- FPL Library: FPL houses a national Forest Service library that is open to the public. Subject areas include solid wood products, pulp and paper, mycology, wood anatomy, wood engineering, biotechnology, adhesives, wood preservation, fire research, economics, biodeterioration of wood, paints and coatings, and recycling.

== Research & Testing Facilities ==
=== Centennial Research Facility ===
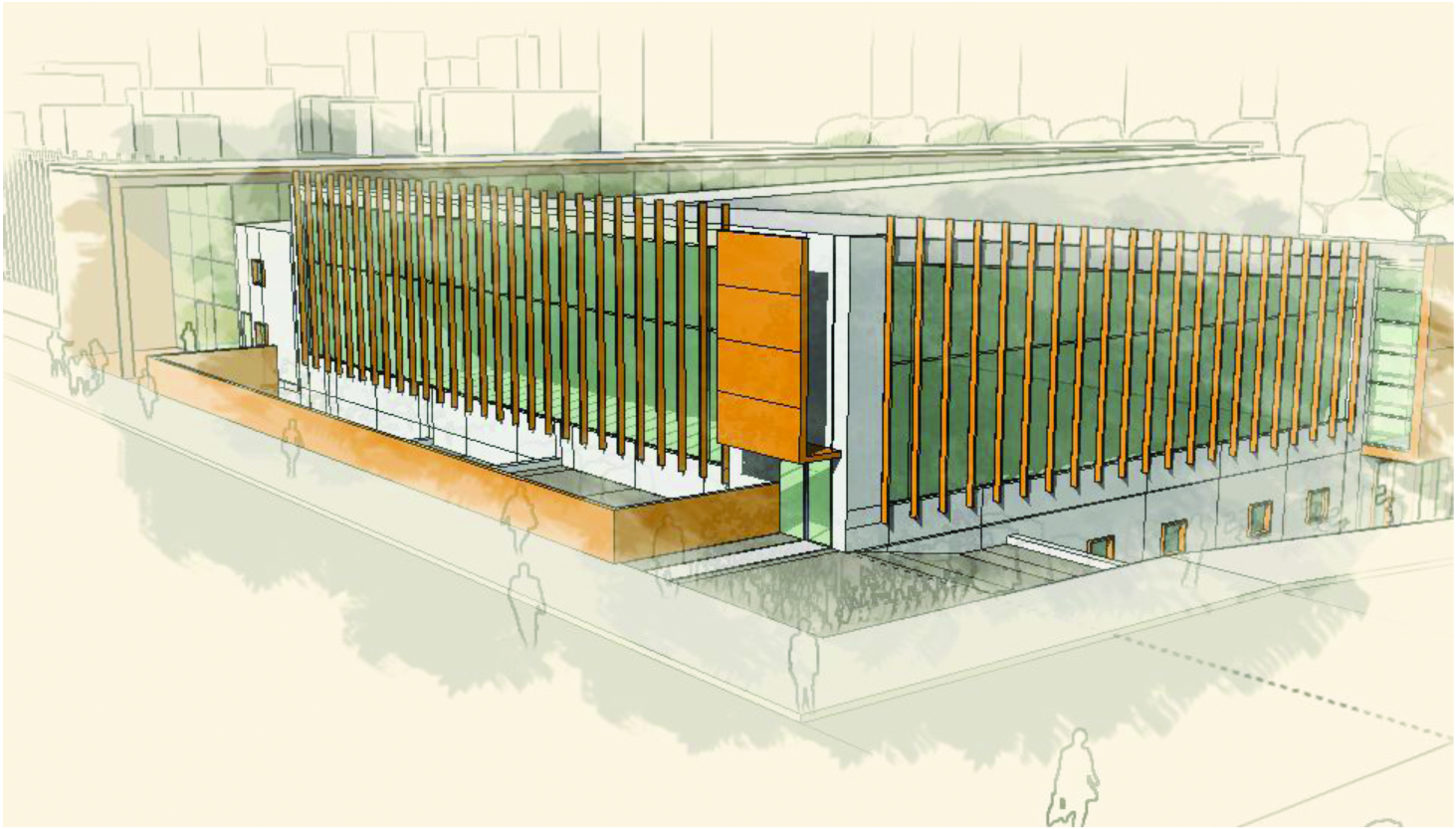
The USDA Forest Products Laboratory's Centennial Research Facility in Madison, Wisconsin.

The most advanced large-scale addition to the FPL in over 70 years is the new Centennial Research Facility (CRF), a 87,000-square-foot (8,100 m^{2}) multi-use laboratory. This facility was built to meet qualifications for Silver certification by the Leadership in Energy and Environmental Design (LEED) rating system developed by the U.S. Green Building Council. As such, the CRF was designed and built using strategies to improve performance across the most important efficiency metrics: energy savings, water usage, greenhouse gas emissions reduction, improved indoor environmental quality, and stewardship of resources including sensitivity to their impacts. CRF researchers in engineering mechanics can test the strength of full-scale structures while durability researchers put wood products to the test in a rather punishing weather simulation chamber. Modern preservation testing equipment will replace the older vessels previously used, while an efficient and manufacturing-friendly floor plan will help advance research in wood- and bio-based composites.

=== Research Demonstration House and Carriage House ===
FPL has constructed two full-scale structures, the Research Demonstration House and Carriage House, for research and educational activities. Both of these structures allow researchers to conduct housing-related studies in a real-world setting, which can significantly extend knowledge obtained in a laboratory environment. These structures are a result of collaboration through the Advanced Housing Research Center, established by FPL in 2000, which includes a wide range of partners from both the public and privates sectors working to improve housing technologies.

=== Fire Test Lab ===
The fire testing facility at FPL is key to developing safe, durable building products. The current facility is equipped to perform standardized tests for flame retardancy and fire resistance. Plans for construction of a new fire test facility are underway, and current capabilities will be enhanced by enabling simulation of actual fire scenarios on a larger scale. The new facility will allow researchers to better address wildland fire threats to structures and development of performance-based building codes.

=== Pulp & Paper Plant ===
FPL's fiber processing pilot plant is equipped to replicate industrial pulping and papermaking processes on a pilot scale. With capabilities in chip production, pulping, paper and fiberboard production, and even recycling, researchers can test new methods and evaluate their effectiveness on equipment similar to that used by commercial manufacturers.

=== Nanocellulose Pilot Plant ===
In August, 2012, the FPL unveiled a $1.7 million production facility for renewable, forest-based nanomaterials. This facility is the first of its kind in the United States and one that positions the laboratory as the country's leading producer of nanocellulose materials. Nanocellulose is simply wood fiber broken down to the nanoscale. For perspective, a nanometer is roughly one-millionth the thickness of an American dime. Materials at this minute scale have unique properties; nanocellulose-based materials can be stronger than Kevlar fiber and provide high strength properties with low weight. Applications for nanocellulose materials, for example, include use in lightweight armor and ballistic glass. Companies in the automotive, aerospace, electronics, consumer products, and medical device industries also see high potential for these innovative materials in a wide variety of applications.

The facility will support an emerging market for wood-derived renewable nanomaterials, helping to spur forest-based job growth and contribute an estimated $600 billion to the American economy by 2020. The U.S. and other nations will see numerous benefits from the commercialization of wood-derived cellulosic nanomaterials. Development and commercialization of new lightweight, high-performance wood-derived products can help reduce fossil fuel consumption and greenhouse gas emissions while increasing the potential for rural manufacturing opportunities, including the creation of many new high-paying jobs. The Forest Product Lab's new facility will aid in the commercialization of these materials by providing researchers and early adopters of the technology with working quantities of forest-based nanomaterials.
