= Stergios Adamopoulos =

Greek and Swedish university professor and wood scientist

Stergios Adamopoulos Στέργιος Αδαμόπουλος
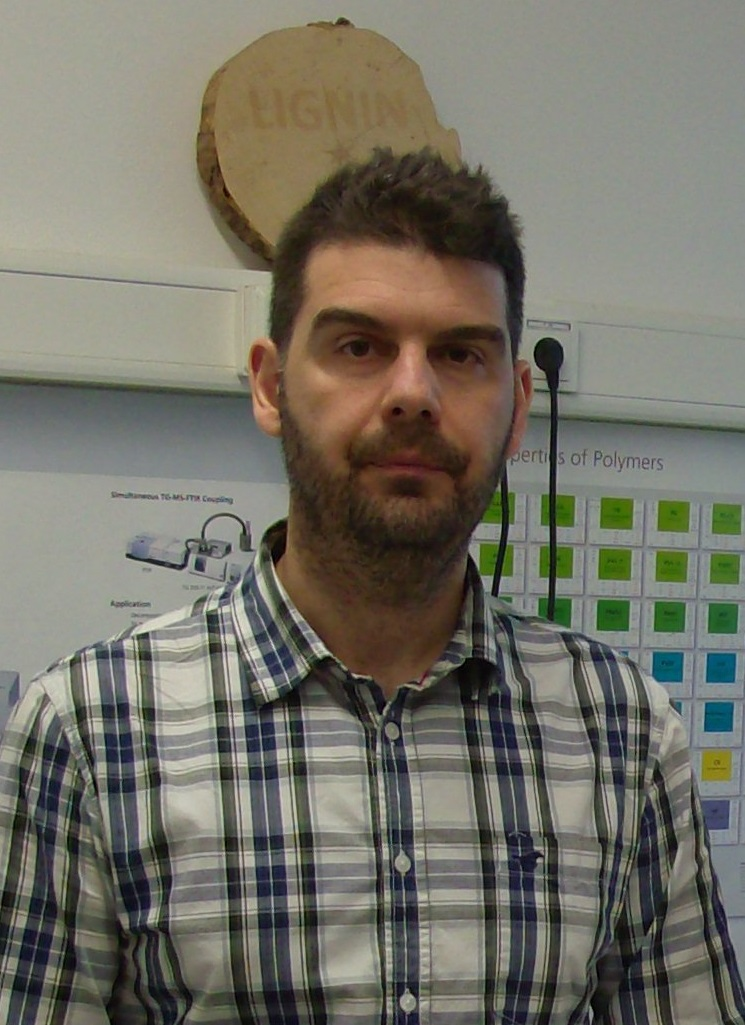
- Born: 24 March 1973 (age 53); Tsotyli, Greece
- Education: Aristotle University of Thessaloniki
- Occupations: Researcher; educator; wood scientist
- Years active: Since 1998
- Awards: Fellow of the IAWS (2023)
- Scientific career
- Workplaces: Swedish University of Agricultural Sciences; Linnaeus University; Georg-August University; TEI of Thessaly; AIDIMME
- Thesis: Anatomical characteristics and technical properties of black locust wood (Robinia pseudoacacia L.) (2001)

Stergios Adamopoulos (Greek: Στέργιος Αδαμόπουλος; born on 24 March 1973) is a Swedish Greek researcher and professor of wood science and technology at the Swedish University of Agricultural Sciences at Uppsala, who is an elected fellow (FIAWS) of the International Academy of Wood Science.

== First years and education ==
He was born in 1973 in Tsotyli, Greece, where he spent his childhood and completed his secondary education at Tsotyli High School in 1990.

In 1990, he enrolled in the Department of Forestry and Natural Environment at Aristotle University of Thessaloniki, graduating in 1995 with a specialization in wood science. He completed his PhD on wood structure and properties in the same department, under the guidance of Dr. Elias Voulgaridis, earning his doctorate degree with distinction in 2001.

== Career ==
He began his research career in 2002 and worked as a postdoctoral researcher in Spain (2003–2004) at AIDIMA - Wood and Furniture Research Center (today AIDIMME), in Valencia.

From 2006 to 2015, he served as a faculty member in the Departments of Forestry and Natural Environment at Democritus University of Thrace in Orestiada and the Technological Educational Institute of Thessaly in Karditsa, specializing in wood science. In 2009 and 2014, he was a visiting professor and researcher at Georg-August University in Göttingen, Germany, through a DAAD fellowship for "International Wood Technology". In 2015, he moved in Sweden and was elected full professor at Linnaeus University (Department of Forestry and Wood Technology at Vaxjo) in February of the same year. Since November 2020, he has been a full professor of wood science and technology at the Department of Forest Biomaterials and Technology at the Swedish University of Agricultural Sciences. His research focuses on the development of new wood products, bridging forestry with wood technology, with an emphasis on eco-friendly and sustainable materials, also including biobased adhesives for wood composites and wood-based panels.

He is also actively involved in wood science initiatives within the International Union of Forest Research Organizations (IUFRO) and is a senior member of the International Association of Wood Anatomists (IAWA). Adamopoulos is an elected member at the editorial board of the journal, Wood and Fiber Science.

Adamopoulos currently heads the Vinnova Competence Centre on bio-adhesives (2023–2028) in Sweden in collaboration with major industries, and also coordinates the EC Horizon project EcoReFibre (2022–2026), which aims to recycle MDF boards at TRL.

As of March 2025, Adamopoulos and his collaborators have published over 100 scientific articles in international journals, with his research receiving more than 3,000 citations at Google Scholar.

== Recognition ==
In 2018, Adamopoulos was appointed in the editorial board of the scientific journal, Wood Material Science and Engineering and additionally serves as a reviewer for the wood-related scientific journals, Holzforschung, Wood Science and Technology, and European Journal of Wood and Wood Products. Since 2021, he has served as associate editor at the journal, Canadian Journal of Forest Research.

In 2021, his research team collaboratively submitted the European research projects "BioGlue-Centre: Competence Centre for Bio-based Adhesives" and "EcoReFibre - Ecological Solutions for Recovery of Secondary Raw Materials from Post-Consumer Fibreboards" under the HORIZON framework, with Adamopoulos serving as the leading coordinator.

In 2023, the International Academy of Wood Science (IAWS) elected Adamopoulos as a fellow for his yearlong scientific and research work.

== Links ==
- Scopus
- ResearchGate
