= Jugo Ilic =

Yugoslav-born Australian wood scientist

- Born: 1950 (age 75–76); Yugoslavia
- Education: Monash University, University of Melbourne
- Known for: Studies on wood identification
- Scientific career
- Fields: Wood science
- Workplaces: CSIRO, University of Melbourne

Jugo Ilic (born 1950) is a Yugoslav-born Australian wood anatomist and retired wood scientist, known for his work on timber identification.

He is presently an honorary associate professor at The University of Melbourne, and also, has served as the curator of the CSIRO Dadswell Memorial Wood Collection. In 2005, he was elected a fellow at the International Academy of Wood Science for his yearlong research work.

== Research career ==
He received a diploma of applied science from the Monash University (1972-1977), and also a MSc in applied science from the same university. He carried out his doctorate studies (2001-2003) at the The University of Melbourne with specialisation in wood science.

He worked for 36 years at the Commonwealth Scientific and Industrial Research Organisation (CSIRO), specialising in wood identification and wood quality research. In 1991, Ilic authored the CSIRO Atlas of Hardwoods, and contributed to the development of methods for identifying timber through its anatomical characteristics. His work also covered wood–water relationships, non-destructive testing and wood properties.

He has contributed to international wood anatomy research, including the collaborative IAWA List of Microscopic Features for Softwood Identification published in 2004. The research work of Ilic has contributed to the identification and characterisation of hardwoods and softwoods. He has also been associated with the CSIRO wood collection and the documentation of wood anatomical features used in timber identification.

In 1998, he investigated the woods of the Belitung shipwreck, a wreck that was discovered by local fishermen in the Gelasa Strait. Also, he was one of the contributors of the modern wood database, InsideWood, which is based at the North Carolina State University (NCSU). In addition, Ilic has been an active member of the International Association of Wood Anatomists (IAWA).

== Selected publications ==
- CSIRO Atlas of Hardwoods (1991)
- IAWA List of Microscopic Features for Softwood Identification (2004), contributor.
