= Stavros Avramidis =

Greek Canadian wood researcher and professor (born 1958)

Stavros Avramidis Σταύρος Αβραμίδης
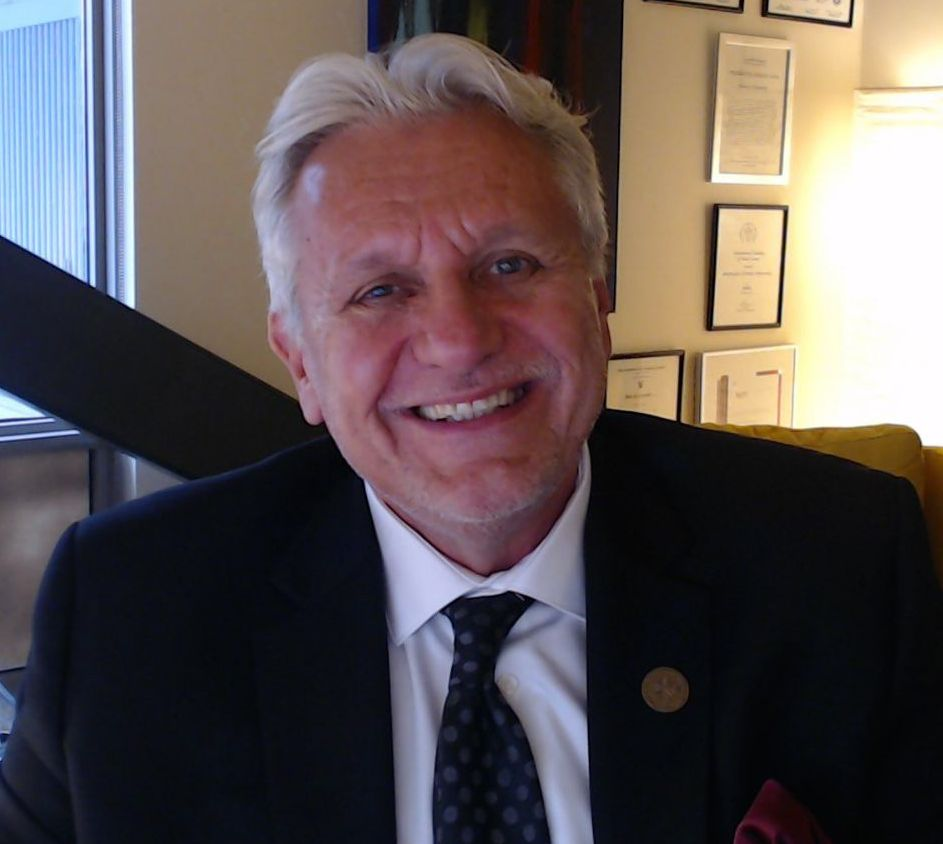
- Stavros Avramidis in 2025
- Born: April 6, 1958 (age 68); Kavala, Greece
- Education: Aristotle University of Thessaloniki (BSc); State University of New York College of Environmental Science and Forestry (MSc, PhD)
- Occupations: Researcher, educator, wood scientist, and president of IAWS (2023-2026)
- Years active: Since 1982
- Known for: Studies on wood drying
- Awards: Fellowship of IAWS (2008). Ternryd Award of Swedish Linnaeus Academy Research Foundation (2022). Distinguished Service Award from the International Society of Wood Science and Technology (2026).

Stavros Avramidis (Greek: Σταύρος Αβραμίδης; born in Kavala, Greece; April 6, 1958) is a Greek Canadian academician, wood scientist and senior researcher, who is professor at the University of British Columbia in Canada.

For his research work, he received the Ternryd Award in 2022 from the Linnaeus Academy Research Foundation of Sweden and the International Society of Wood Science and Technology Distinguished Service Award in 2026. In addition, he is an elected fellow (FIAWS) and a distinguished member of the International Academy of Wood Science, where he served as elected president for the 2023–2026 term.

== First years and education ==
Avramidis was born in Kavala, Greece, on April 6, 1958, and grew up in Thessaloniki. He attended the Department of Forestry at the Aristotle University of Thessaloniki and received his university degree in 1981. Following that, he pursued research-based postgraduate (1982–1983) (M.S. in the area of composite products) and doctoral studies (1983–1986) in the United States at the State University of New York College of Environmental Science and Forestry, in the area of biopolymer physics under the guidance of John F. Siau.

== Academic career ==
Avramidis began his academic career in 1987 in Canada at the University of British Columbia (UBC) as an assistant professor at Department of Wood Science in the Faculty of Forestry. After a two-year leave from academia (1988-1990) to do his military service in Greece, he returned to UBC and was promoted to associate professor in 1993 and full professor in 1998. Avramidis served as the Head of the UBC Department of Wood Science for two consecutive terms, from 2016 to the present.

Avramidis's research team has presented research work on the physical and drying properties of wood. His applied research addresses practical issues in the Canadian wood industry related to energy optimization and upgrading production methods, using acoustic, electrical, and optical techniques, as well as radio wave methods, simulation, and artificial intelligence.

== Research work and recognition ==
Avramidis along with his colleagues have authored over 250 scientific articles, more than 100 industrial studies, and his research work has received more than 3,540 citations at Scopus database until June 2026. In 2012, Avramidis was selected as a member of the editorial board of the journal, Wood Material Science and Engineering. He has been a member of the editorial boards of Holzforschung, Drying Technology, Wood Research, European Journal of Wood and Wood Products, Maderas: Ciencia y Tecnología and Drying Technology.

In 2020, his name was included in Mendeley Data, published in the journal, PLOS Biology for the impact of his novel research in wood drying. In 2022, Avramidis received the Ternryd Award 2022 from the Swedish Linnaeus Academy Research Foundation for his research in wood science.

In June 2023, Avramidis was elected as the president of the International Academy of Wood Science, for the years 2023–2026. In October 2023, a refereed metaresearch conducted by John Ioannidis and his team at Stanford University, included Avramidis in Elsevier Data 2022, where he was placed at the top 2% of researchers in the area of wood physics. In 2024 and 2025, Avramidis has acquired the same international distinction for his research work in wood science (Elsevier Data; career data).

In June 2026, Avramidis received the Distinguished Service Award from the International Society of Wood Science and Technology (SWST), which recognizes distinguished service to the scientific area of wood science, citing his contributions to the field through advocacy, teaching, research, and professional service.

Until June 2026, Avramidis has received more than 5,000 citations for his yearlong research work at Google Scholar.
