= Elisabeth Wheeler =

American scientist (born 1944)

Elisabeth A. Wheeler
- Wheeler in 2026
- Born: January 10, 1944 (age 82); Stockton, California
- Education: Reed College, Southern Illinois University Carbondale
- Occupations: Researcher, educator, botanist
- Years active: 1972-2025

Elisabeth A. Wheeler (Stockton, California, 10 January 1944) is an American biologist, botanist, and wood scientist. She is a professor emerita at the Department of Forest Biomaterials at North Carolina State University and also an elected fellow in the International Academy of Wood Science.

== Research career ==
In 1965, Wheeler received a bachelor’s degree in biology from the Reed College at Portland, Oregon. She carried out post-graduate studies (M.Sc.) in botany at Southern Illinois University Carbondale in the period 1968 to 1970). She later did doctorate research in the area of botany and obtained a PhD degree in 1972.

During the period 1972–1976, she worked as a curatorial assistant and research associate at the Bailey-Wetmore Laboratory of Plant Anatomy and Morphology at Harvard University. In 1976, Wheeler became an assistant professor at North Carolina State University in the Department of Wood and Paper Science. She retired as a full professor in 2008.

Between 2003 and 2008, Wheeler coordinated the NSF-funded project entitled InsideWood, which led to the creation of a unique research and educational database, that contains over 66,000 wood-anatomy photomicrographs.

She has been a member of the International Association of Wood Anatomists, the Botanical Society of America, and the International Organization of Paleobotany. She is also a fellow at the International Society of Wood Science and Technology. For several years she served as the co-editor of IAWA Journal.

Her work has focused primarily on wood anatomy and paleontology (late cretaceous and early tertiary fossil woods), Most of her research work has been jointly made with Pieter Baas.

== Recognition ==
In 2023, a meta-research coordinated by John Ioannidis at Stanford University included Elisabeth Wheeler in Elsevier Data 2022, where she was ranked at the top 2% of researchers of all time in "forestry – paleontology". She received the same ranking in 2024, 2025 and 2026.

Until November 2026, the work of Wheeler has received more than 9,600 citations at Google Scholar.

== Selected publications ==
- Wheeler, et al. (1989). IAWA list of microscopic features for hardwood identification (1,206 citations)
- Wheeler, E.A. (2011). Inside Wood– A web resource for hardwood anatomy (716 citations)

== Personal life ==
She resides in Raleigh, North Carolina.
