= Mark Irle =

British wood scientist and senior researcher

- Born: December 21, 1960 (age 65); London
- Education: University of Wales at Bangor
- Occupations: Researcher; educator; wood scientist
- Years active: Since 1986
- Known for: Studies on wood-based panels
- Awards: Fellow of the IAWS (2020) Fellow of the Académie d'Agriculture de France (2024)
- Scientific career
- Workplaces: University of Wales: Biocomposite Centre; École supérieure du bois
- Thesis: Physical Aspects of Wood Adhesive Bond Formation with Formaldehyde Based Adhesives (1986)

Mark Irle (London, 1960) is a British wood scientist, senior researcher at the École Supérieure du Bois and research coordinator at the FCBA, who is an elected fellow (FIAWS) of the International Academy of Wood Science and a member of the Académie d'Agriculture de France.

== Research career ==
Irle holds a BSc degree in wood science (1982). He obtained his doctorate degree in wood technology in 1986 from the University of Wales in Bangor. He has had a background in teaching and research in the United Kingdom (Biocomposite Centre at Bangor, Buckinghamshire Chilterns University College), before relocating to ESB-France in 2002.

He is currently a senior researcher at the École supérieure du bois (ESB) in Nantes and research coordinator at the FCBA. He has served as the President of InnovaWood, a European network for innovation in the forest-based sector from 2017 to 2021. He also serves as a member at the editorial boards of scientific journals: International Wood Products Journal, Wood Material Science and Engineering, and European Journal of Wood and Wood Products.

His research is related to wood-based composites and has participated in European projects such as CaReWood, which aimed to enhance the recyclability of wood based materials. His work also includes the extraction and characterization of cellulose nanocrystals from post-consumer wood fiberboard waste.

Irle has supervised several doctoral theses at the École centrale de Nantes, focusing on topics like wood hygiene, recycling of solid wood and MDF, and the development of biosourced composites. He has also been involved in various European research initiatives, including the FLEXIBI project, and the EU-funded Horizon project EcoReFibre, which explores recycling methods for old, waste fiberboards.

Until August 2025, the research work of Irle has received more than 5,500 citations at Google Scholar.
