= Wilfred A. Côté Jr. =

American academician, university professor and wood scientist (1924-2012)

- Born: Willimantic, Connecticut
- Education: University of Maine; Duke University
- Known for: Studies on wood ultrastructure
- Awards: Fellow of the International Academy of Wood Science
- Scientific career
- Workplaces: State University of New York College of Environmental Science and Forestry

Wilfred A. Côté Jr. (27 May 1924 – 8 March 2012) was an American wood scientist and professor at the State University of New York College of Environmental Science and Forestry (SUNY-ESF).

He was an elected Fellow of the International Academy of Wood Science. He carried out novel research on the wood ultrastructure and the application of electron microscopy to wood science.

== Life and career ==
Côté was born in Willimantic, Connecticut. He received a bachelor's degree from the University of Maine in 1949 and also a master's degree in wood technology from Duke University in 1950. Then, he served in the US Army during the World War II. After the war, he joined the State University College of Forestry at Syracuse University as an instructor. He received a PhD degree in 1958, completing a dissertation on electron microscopy of wood.

He became professor of wood technology in 1965, and also the director of the N.C. Brown Center for Ultrastructure Studies from 1970. He served as dean of the School of Environmental and Resource Engineering from 1976 to 1980.

He retired in 1991. He continued to research after his retirement, and died in 2012.

== Scientific work ==
The research work of Côté and his coworkers concerned mostly the structure, microscopy, and physical properties of wood, as well wood preservation.

He organized a scientific conference on the cellular ultrastructure of woody plants in 1964 and edited its proceedings, published in 1965 as Cellular Ultrastructure of Woody Plants by Syracuse University Press.

He was an elected fellow of the International Academy of Wood Science from 1968 until his passing. In 1980, he received the highest award of the IAWS, the Academy Lecturer distinction for his scientific work. He authored 92 technical papers and books, and contributed to the area of wood anatomy.
