= Institute of Wood Science =

British professional body for the timber industry

The Institute of Wood Science (IWSc) was incorporated in 1955 as a professional body for the timber industries and allied professions. In 2009 it merged with the Institute of Materials, Minerals and Mining (IOM3), and became known as The Wood Technology Society. Following restructuring and rebranding of the IOM3 it changed its name to the Wood Technology Group in 2021.

The IWSc aimed to promote and encourage a better understanding of timber, wood-based materials and associated timber processes and products in the United Kingdom and beyond. It represented people employed within the timber importing, merchanting, manufacturing and user industries, together with those in education and research. In particular, it represented the interests and know-how of wood scientists and wood technologists. IWSc organised training and conferences. Through local groups it held meetings and visits to keep members up to date in an era when large technological advances were occurring in the wood products sector. This activity continues as the Wood Technology Group of IOM3.

== History ==
The Institute for Wood Science (IWSc) was formed in 1955 by several leading members of the wood industry in the UK and wood scientists, recognising that if timber was to compete effectively with other materials there needed to be an understanding of wood science and wood technologies. At this time there were dramatic changes in timber supply, innovations in timber use, and the introduction of new timber products. There was a clear need for an organisation to encourage and support this advancement of knowledge. The IWSc was originally based in the City of London, UK., followed by many years at Hughenden Valley, near High Wycombe. It was registered as a charity in 1998. There were active local branches throughout the UK, as well as in Ireland, Australia and Canada.

In March 1958 the IWSc published the first edition of the Journal of the Institute of Wood Science (now the International Wood Products Journal). Between 1999 and 2007 it also produced a member magazine called Woodfocus

Among the list of former presidents of the IWSc is Jean Marion Taylor, BSc FIWSc, who served from 1986 to 1988. Jean, who was an entomologist working on chemical preservatives for wood, was the first female president of any of the Institutes that now make up the IOM3.

== Function ==
The function of the IWSc was to provide a forum for the timber trade and timber research to come together, thereby furthering wood science and technology to the wider community. It provided recognised education and training qualifications in wood science and technology through courses and examinations. Membership grades were:

- Hon Fellow (Hon FIWSc)
- Fellow (FIWSc)
- Associate (AIWSc)
- Retired Member
- Member (MIWSc)
- Ordinary Member
- Certificated Member (CMIWSc)
- Student

The IWSc acted as the examining body for the UK timber trade, awarding qualifications at Certificate (intermediate) and Associate levels. Both levels were based in a workbook concept and were designed to provide information leading to self-seeking study for completion. The theory was complemented by several practical exercises. People successful at the certificate level were able to use the post-nominal letters CMIWSc and those at Associate level AIWSc. Post-nominals are still used today by some former members to signify the qualifications.

== See also ==
- Alice Holt Research Station
- Furniture Industry Research Association
- List of forest research institutes
- Forestry Commission
- Timber Trade Federation
- Journal: International Wood Products Journal
