= George Tsoumis =

Greek wood scientist and professor emeritus

George Tsoumis Γεώργιος Τσουμής
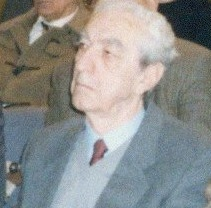
- Prof. Em. Dr. George Tsoumis in 2000
- Born: Γεώργιος Θ. Τσουμής; 13 September 1920; Kozani, Greece
- Died: 2011 (aged 90–91)
- Education: Aristotle University of Thessaloniki; University of Michigan; Yale University
- Scientific career
- Fields: Wood science and technology Forestry
- Workplaces: Aristotle University of Thessaloniki

George Tsoumis (Greek: Γεώργιος Τσουμής; 13 September 1920 – 2011) was a Greek wood scientist and professor emeritus at the Aristotle University of Thessaloniki (Department of Forestry and Natural Environment), who was an elected fellow and distinguished member of the International Academy of Wood Science (IAWS) and fellow of the Hellenic Agricultural Academy.

== First years and education ==
Tsoumis was born in Kozani, Greece, in 1920, the son of Thomas and Aikaterini Tsoumis. He studied forestry at the Aristotle University of Thessaloniki, graduating with distinction in 1942.

With a Fulbright scholarship, he continued postgraduate studies in the United States at the University of Michigan, earning a master's degree in wood technology in 1951. In 1957, he completed his Ph.D. at Yale University, becoming the first Greek scholar to receive a doctorate degree in wood science.

== Career ==
From 1961 to 1965, Tsoumis served as assistant professor at Montana State University and at Pennsylvania State University. In 1966, he was visiting professor at Yale University.

Upon returning to Greece, he was appointed full professor at the Aristotle University of Thessaloniki, where he organized the first academic laboratories and curricula in wood science and technology during the 1960s and 1970s. He retired in 1987 and was named professor emeritus.

He was a member of the International Association of Wood Anatomists (IAWA). Also, Tsoumis served as a visiting professor at Colorado State University in 1984, and at Auburn University in 1985.

Tsoumis authored several books and articles in wood science. His research on the structure and technology of wood has been widely cited internationally. His best-known book, Science and Technology of Wood – Structure, Properties, Utilization (1991, Verlag Kessel), has received over 1,800 citations worldwide.

Other major works include:

- Wood as Raw Material: Source, Structure, Chemical Composition, Growth, Degradation and Identification (Elsevier Science, 2013)
- Wood Science and Technology (in Greek), vols. I–II, Gartaganis Editions
- Harvesting of Forest Products (Metabook, in Greek)
- Forests and Environment in Ancient Greece (University Studio Press, 2007)

In 1975, he was elected a fellow of the International Academy of Wood Science for his yearlong scientific work on wood science. Specifically for Greece, he is considered as the founder of modern wood science education in the country, and served also as the president of the Hellenic Forestry Society in the years 1983–1984.

Until September 2025, the research work of Tsoumis has received 2,376 citations at Google Scholar.

== Personal life ==
In 1954, Tsoumis married Alexandra Mamatsiou. They had two sons, Thomas and Konstantinos Tsoumis, both physicians in Thessaloniki.
