= Iranian Journal of Wood and Paper Industries =

- Discipline: Wood science, paper science, forest products
- Language: English
- Edited by: Ahmad Samariha

Publication details
- History: 2015–present
- Publisher: Iranian Scientific Association of Wood and Paper Industries (Iran)
- Frequency: Semiannual
- Open access: Yes
- ISO 4: Find out here

Links
- Journal homepage

The Iranian Journal of Wood and Paper Industries is a semiannual peer-reviewed scientific journal established in 2015 and published by the Iranian Scientific Association of Wood and Paper Industries.

It focuses on research in wood science, paper science, and related fields, including wood anatomy, pulping, papermaking, wood composites, wood preservation, wood biology, and wood chemistry. The current editor-in-charge of the journal is Dr. Ahmad Samariha.

The journal is indexed in the Directory of Open Access Journals (DOAJ) and is available in open access under a Creative Commons Attribution (CC BY) license. Manuscripts are accepted in Persian, and the journal follows a double-anonymous peer review process. In general, the papers are in Persian language with the abdtasct in English.

Iranian Journal of Wood and Paper Industries is listed at the database of Google Scholar.

== See also ==
- Wood science
- Pulp
- Forest products
