= Mokuzai Gakkaishi =

- Discipline: Wood science, wood chemistry, forest products
- Language: English
- Edited by: Dr. Kenji Umemura

Publication details
- History: 1956–present
- Publisher: The Japan Wood Research Society (Japan)
- Frequency: Quarterly
- Open access: Hybrid
- Impact factor: 0.1 (2023)

Standard abbreviations
- ISO 4: Mokuzai Gakkaishi

Links
- Journal homepage; Online access (J-STAGE); Online archive

The Mokuzai Gakkaishi (Japanese: 木材学会誌) is a peer-reviewed scientific journal published by the Japan Wood Research Society. It focuses on research in wood science, forest products, wood chemistry, and wood-based materials. The journal has been published continuously since 1956.

Articles are primarily published in Japanese, with English abstracts. The journal provides a platform for researchers working in the areas of wood anatomy, durability, processing, physical and mechanical properties, lignocellulose chemistry, and related technologies.

The editor-in-chief of the journal is Dr. Kenji Umemura. The journal has an impact factor of 0.1 as of 2023.

The journal is abstracted and indexed in the following bibliographic databases:

- Scopus
- Web of Science
- CAB Abstracts
- Google Scholar

== See also ==
- Wood
- Wood science
- Forest products
