= Joris Van Acker =

Belgian university professor, wood scientist and researcher

- Born: 1960 (age 65–66); Belgium
- Known for: wood protection and service-life prediction
- Awards: Fellow of IAWS
- Scientific career
- Fields: wood science
- Workplaces: Ghent University

Joris Van Acker (born 1960) is a Belgian wood scientist and professor at Ghent University, who is an elected fellow (FIAWS) of the International Academy of Wood Science and former president of the International Research Group on Wood Protection (IRG-WP).

== Education and research career ==
Van Acker received a bachelor degree in forestry and wood technology, designated as bio-science engineer, followed by a PhD from Ghent University, focusing on the treatability and durability of plywood.

After a brief period as plant manager in wood industry, being responsible for poplar veneer production, he returned to academia and joined the Laboratory of Wood Technology at Ghent, where he was later appointed professor and head of Woodlab. Since 2009, Woodlab has been integrated into the Ghent University Centre for X-ray Tomography (UGCT).

His research work spans wood anatomy, wood protection and modification, durability, physical and mechanical testing, and the development of bio-based building materials. Under his leadership, Woodlab supports several PhD students and postdocs and also participates in international forum, such as COST Action, InnovaWood, FAO, CEN TC 38 standardization and other.

In 2008, Van Acker edited a book titled “A European Wood Processing Strategy”, and in 2023, he co-authored the chapter of “Wood Preservation” in the referred handbook, "Springer Handbook of Wood Science and Technology".

In December 2016, the International Academy of Wood Science elected Van Acker as a fellow for his yearlong research and scientific work.

Until August 2025, Van Acker has had 7,890 international citations recorded at Google Scholar for his career research work.

== Personal life ==
He is married to Marijke Nys, with whom he has nine grown-up children.

== Selected publications ==
- Boonstra, M.J., Van Acker, J., et al. (2007). Strength properties of thermally modified softwoods and its relation to polymeric structural wood constituents. Annals of Forest Science, 64(7): 679–690 (GS citations: 499).
- Boonstra, M.J., Van Acker, J., et al. (2007). Optimisation of a two-stage heat treatment process: durability aspects. Wood Science and Technology, 41(1): 31–57 (GS citations: 279).
