= Forest Products Journal =

- Discipline: Forestry
- Language: English
- Edited by: Brian K. Via

Publication details
- History: 1947–present
- Publisher: Forest Products Society (United States)
- Frequency: 8/year
- Open access: Hybrid
- Impact factor: 1.7 (2025)

Standard abbreviations
- ISO 4: For. Prod. J.

Indexing
- CODEN: FPJOAB
- ISSN: 0015-7473 (print); 2376-9637 (web)

Links
- Journal homepage; Online access; Journal page at society website

The Forest Products Journal is a peer-reviewed scientific journal covering research on the science and technology of wood and forest products. It is the official journal of the Forest Products Society. The journal history dates back to the Proceedings of the Forest Products Research Society in 1947. It was then replaced by the Journal of the Forest Products Research Society in 1951. It then changed to the current title in 1954.

The journal covers a wide range of topics related to forest products, including wood anatomy, processing, composites, adhesives, durability, manufacturing, economics, marketing, and sustainability.

== Abstracting and indexing ==
The journal is indexed and abstracted in the following bibliographic databases:

- Business Source Ultimate
- CAB Abstracts
- Compendex
- Environment Index
- ProQuest databases
- Science Citation Index Expanded
- Scopus

The journal has an 2025 impact factor of 1.7.

== See also ==
- Wood
- Wood anatomy
- Wood science
- Forest products
- Natural products
