= Drvna Industrija =

- Discipline: Wood science, wood technology, forest products
- Language: English
- Edited by: Ružica Beljo‑Lučić

Publication details
- History: 1950–present
- Publisher: Faculty of Forestry and Wood Technology, University of Zagreb (Croatia)
- Frequency: Quarterly
- Open access: CC BY 4.0
- Impact factor: 0.7 (2023)
- ISO 4: Find out here

Indexing
- ISSN: 0012-6772 (print); 1847-1153 (web)

Links
- Journal homepage; Editorial office; Journal homepage

Drvna Industrija (English: Wood Industry) is an international, peer-reviewed scientific journal covering research in wood science, wood technology, biomaterials, processing, and trade. It is published quarterly by the Faculty of Forestry and Wood Technology at the University of Zagreb.

The journal was first published in 1950 and operates under an open-access (CC BY 4.0) license since 2006. The editor‑in‑chief is Prof. Ružica Beljo‑Lučić.

According to the 2023 Journal Citation Reports, the journal has an impact factor of 0.7, with a 5‑year impact factor of 0.9, ranking in Q4 in "Materials Science, Paper & Wood". The journal is abstracted and indexed in major databases including the Science Citation Index Expanded, Scopus, and DOAJ.

== See also ==
- Wood science
- Wood anatomy
- Forest products
