= Drewno (journal) =

- Discipline: Wood science, timber technology, forest products
- Language: English
- Edited by: Dominika Janiszewska‑Latterini

Publication details
- History: 2003–present
- Publisher: Łukasiewicz–Poznań Institute of Technology (formerly Institute of Wood Technology) (Poland)
- Frequency: Biannual
- Open access: Hybrid (CC BY 4.0)
- Impact factor: 0.8

Standard abbreviations
- ISO 4: Drewno

Links
- Journal homepage; Guide for authors; Journal homepage

Drewno (English: Wood) is a biannual, peer-reviewed international scientific journal covering basic and applied research in wood science, wood technology, and the forest-based industries. It was first published in 2003 and operates under an open-access license (CC BY 4.0).

The editor‑in‑chief is Dr. Dominika Janiszewska‑Latterini. The journal publishes articles on wood processing, material properties, ecological and economic aspects, composites, and related topics.

According to the 2023 Journal Citation Reports, Drewno has an impact factor of 0.8, with a 5‑year impact factor also at 0.8. It is indexed in the Science Citation Index Expanded and ranks in Q3 for the “Materials Science, Paper & Wood” category. The journal is abstracted and indexed in major bibliographic services, including Scopus and the Science Citation Index Expanded.

== See also ==
- Wood science
- Wood anatomy
- Forest products
