= Journal of Wood Science =

- Discipline: Wood science, forest products, materials science
- Language: English
- Edited by: Dr. Kenji Umemura

Publication details
- History: 1955–present
- Publisher: Springer Science+Business Media (Springer Japan) for the Japan Wood Research Society (Japan)
- Frequency: Bimonthly
- Open access: Hybrid
- Impact factor: 2.2 (2023)
- ISO 4: Find out here

Indexing
- ISSN: 1435-0211 (print); 1611-4663 (web)

Links
- Journal homepage; Online archive; Editorial board

Journal of Wood Science is a peer-reviewed scientific journal published by Springer Japan on behalf of the Japan Wood Research Society. It provides an international forum for basic and applied research in wood and wood-based materials, including chemistry, physics, biology, forest products, pulp and paper, biomass, and construction. The journal was established in 1955.

The current editor-in-chief is Professor Kenji Umemura of Kyoto University.

The journal has an impact factor of 2.2 for 2023, with a 5‑year impact factor of 2.5, ranking in the first quartile (Q1) of the “Materials Science, Paper & Wood” category. It is indexed in the major bibliographic databases including Scopus, Web of Science, CAB Abstracts, and Google Scholar.

== See also ==
- Wood science
- Forest products
- Wood anatomy
