= Wood biology =

Scientific sub-area of wood science

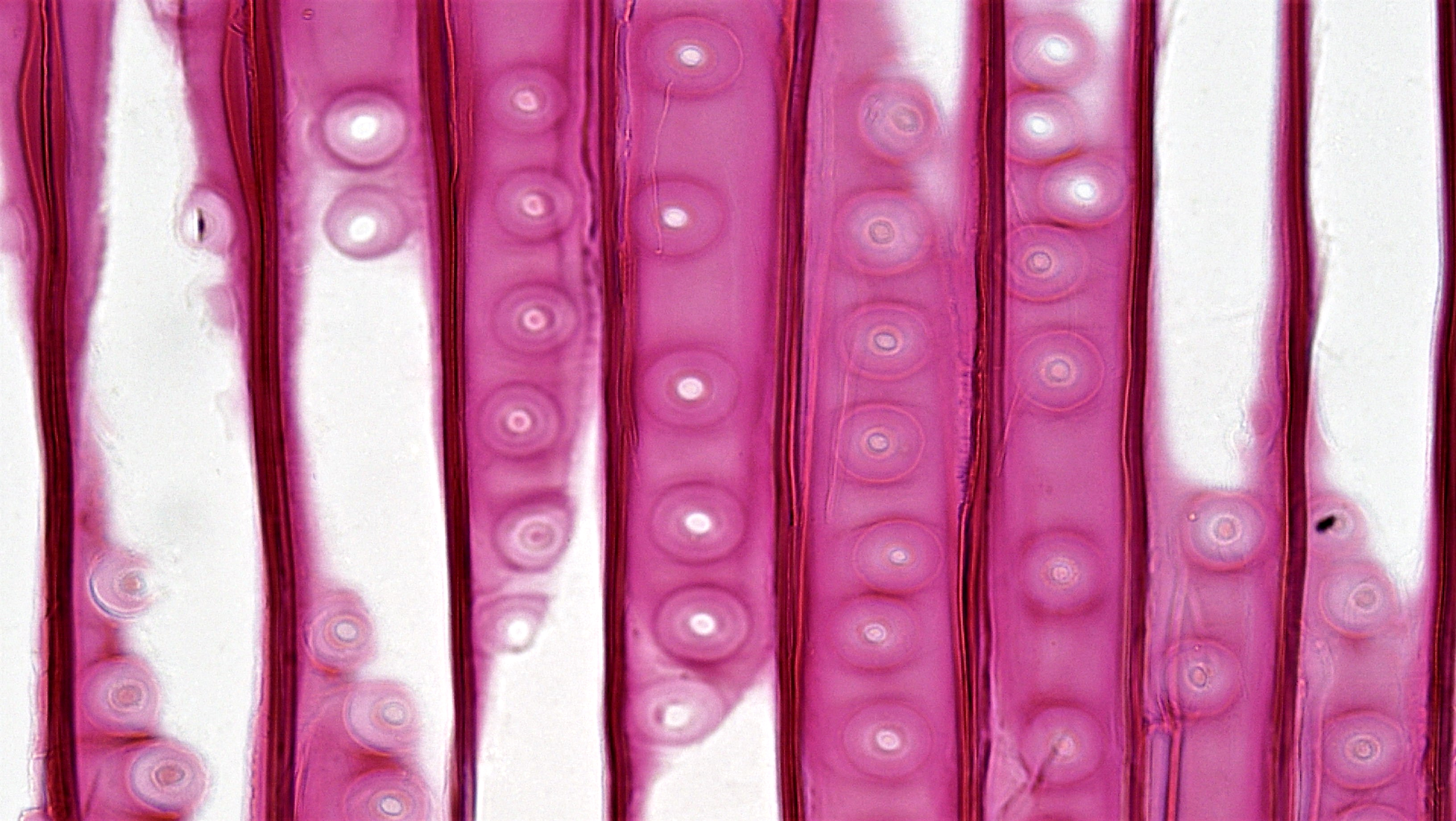
Bordered pits, connecting elements between the tracheids, typical for coniferous woods

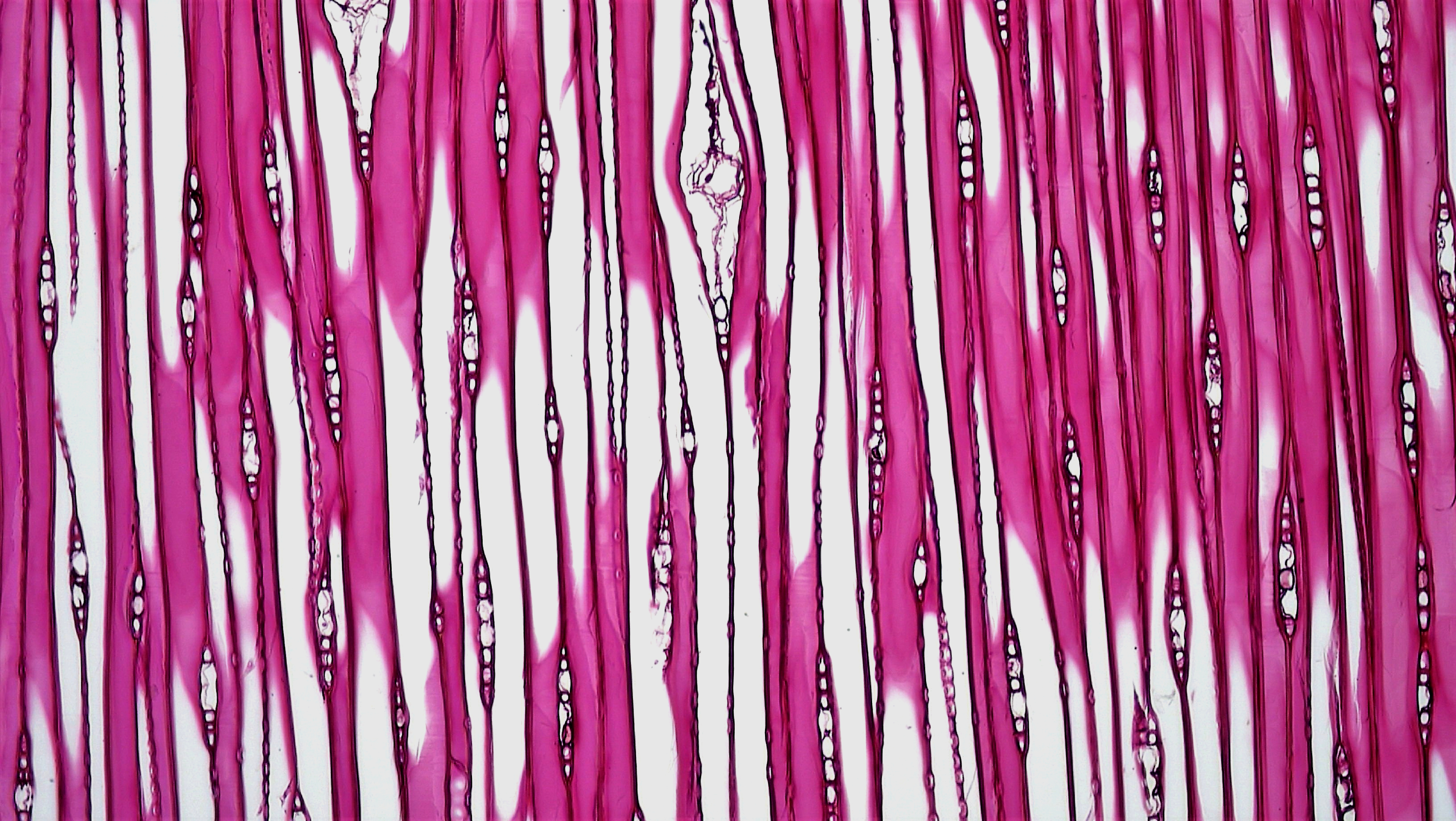
Radial section of wood showing the radial system of rays

Wood biology is a sub-area of wood science, which is related to the biological formation, development, structure, composition, and function of wood (xylem) and its constituent tissues. It examines wood at macroscopic, microscopic, and molecular levels, linking the biology of trees and woody plants with the structure and properties of their xylem (wood).

It includes the study of wood anatomy, xylem formation, cell types and tissues, and the biological processes responsible for the growth of wood. It also studies the variations in wood structure among tree species, within individual woody trees, and in response to environmental and other parameters.

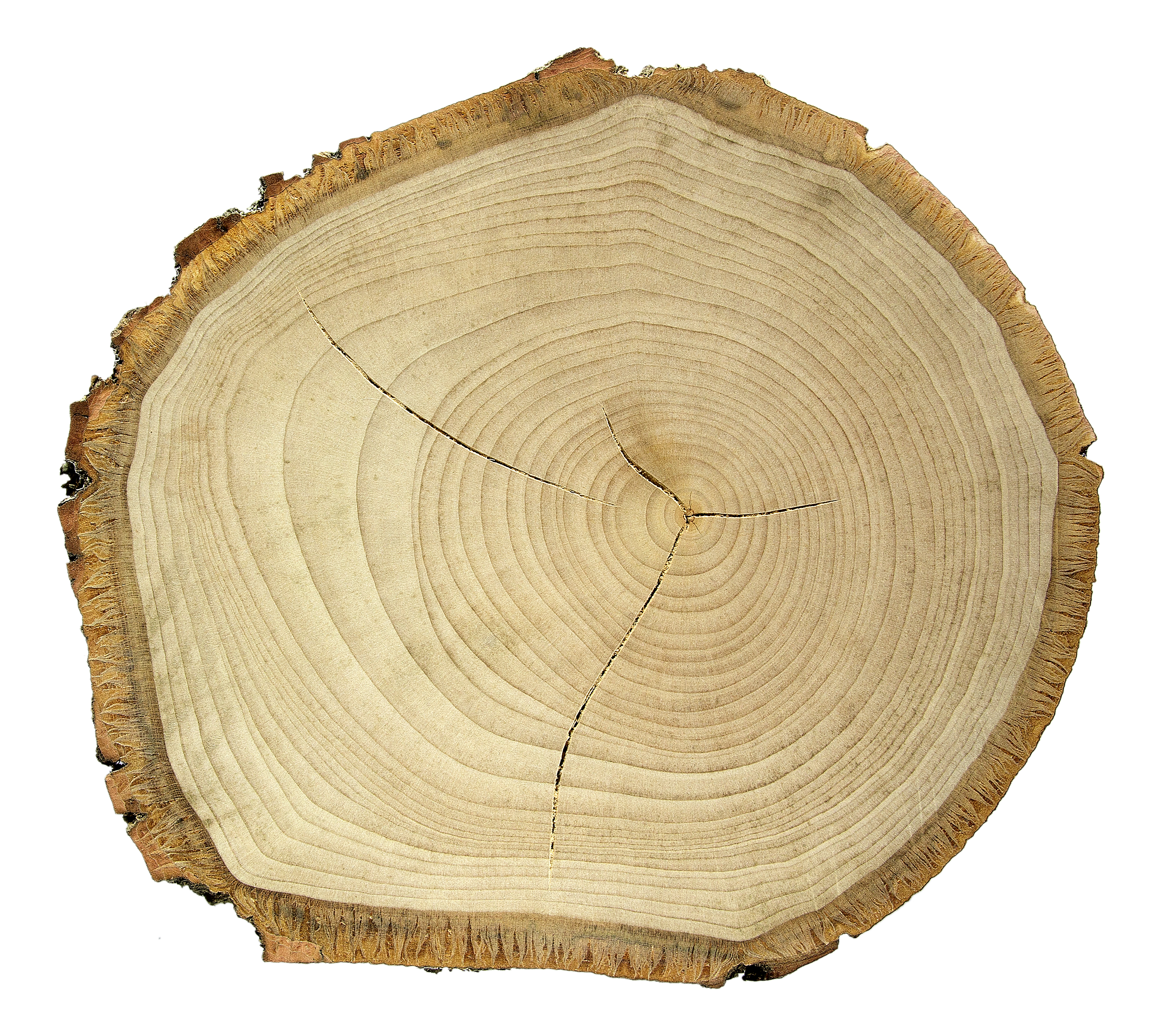
Cross section of lime wood which shows the annual rings.

== Scope ==
Wood biology investigates the formation and organisation of wood from the cellular level to the whole-tree level. Major topics in this include:

- Wood formation — the development of xylem through the activity of the vascular cambium and the differentiation of wood-forming cells.
- Wood anatomy — the study and identification of wood tissues and their anatomical characteristics (named as features) at the macroscopic and microscopic scales.
- Cell structure and function — the characteristics and functions of tracheids, vessel elements, fibres, ray cells and parenchyma cells.
- Wood development — changes in wood structure associated with tree growth, maturation and the formation of heartwood and sapwood.
- Environmental responses — changes in wood formation and structure associated with factors such as water availability, temperature, light and other environmental conditions.

== Wood anatomy ==
Wood anatomy is an important component of wood biology and is concerned with the identification and characterization of wood based on its anatomical structure. Wood elements can be examined using macroscopic and microscopic methods, allowing differences among wood species and tissues to be investigated.

Diagrammatic structure of xylem cells

== Relationship to wood science ==
Wood biology is one of the principal sub-areas of wood science, together with wood chemistry and wood physics. While wood chemistry focuses primarily on the chemical constituents of wood and wood physics examines its physical and mechanical behaviour, wood biology focuses on the biological processes underlying the formation, structure and organization of wood.

== Applications ==
Knowledge of wood biology is utilised in wood identification, forest products research, wood quality assessment, conservation of wooden objects, as well as in the study of wood formation and variation. Understanding the biological differences in wood structure, provides a fundamental basis for interpreting and understanding its physical, chemical, and mechanical properties.

== See also ==
- Wood science
- Wood anatomy
- Xylem
- Dendrochronology
