= Journal of the Korean Wood Science and Technology =

- Discipline: Wood science, forest products, materials science
- Language: English
- Edited by: Dr. Byung-Dae Park

Publication details
- History: 1973–present
- Publisher: Korean Society of Wood Science and Technology (South Korea)
- Frequency: Bimonthly
- Open access: Hybrid
- Impact factor: 3.23 (2023)
- ISO 4: Find out here

Links
- Journal homepage

The Journal of the Korean Wood Science and Technology is a bimonthly peer-reviewed scientific journal established in 1973 as the official publication of the Korean Society of Wood Science and Technology.

The journal covers a wide range of topics in wood science and technology, including wood anatomy, wood deterioration and preservation, wood physics and engineering, wood chemistry and chemical processing, microbiology, wood processing and composites, furniture and construction, wood industry and business, and wood culture and education.

Research on non-wood forest products and non-woody plants as a source of fiber, chemicals, and products that can substitute for wood-based materials are also welcome. Currently, the editor-in-chief is Dr. Byung-Dae Park.

The journal is published by the Korean Society of Wood Science and Technology and is indexed in major bibliographic databases, including Scopus, KCI, Google Scholar, and Crossref.

== See also ==
- Wood science
- Forest products
- Materials science
