= IAWA =

IAWA may refer to:

- International Archive of Women in Architecture
- International Association of Wood Anatomists
- Italian Artisan Web Agency
