= Wood and Fiber Science =

- Discipline: Wood science, fiber science, forest products
- Language: English
- Edited by: Jeffrey Morrell

Publication details
- History: 1969–present
- Publisher: Forest Products Society on behalf of the Society of Wood Science and Technology (United States)
- Frequency: Quarterly
- Open access: Hybrid
- ISO 4: Find out here

Indexing
- ISSN: 0735-6161 (print); 0735-6161 (web)

Links
- Journal homepage; Online archive; Editorial board

Wood and Fiber Science is a quarterly peer-reviewed scientific journal published by the Forest Products Society on behalf of the Society of Wood Science and Technology. Established in 1969, it focuses on research in wood and fiber science, including forest products, fiber characteristics, wood utilization, processing, composites, and related technologies.

The current editor-in-chief is Dr. Jeffrey Morrell.

For 2023, according to Journal Citation Reports (Clarivate), its impact factor is 0.8. It is abstracted and indexed in key bibliographic databases including Scopus and Google Scholar.

== See also ==
- Wood science
- Wood anatomy
- Forest products
