= Avramidis =

Avramidis (Greek: Αβραμίδης) is a Greek surname (female version Avramidi or Avramidou) and may refer to:

- Anastasios Avramidis (1821–1890), Albanian businessman and benefactor
- Dimitrios Avramidis, 21st president of AEK Athens F.C.
- Ioannis Avramidis, Greek para athlete
- Joannis Avramidis (Iωάννης Aβραμίδης) (1922–2016), Greek-Austrian sculptor
- Stavros Avramidis (Σταύρος Αβραμίδης), professor at UBC and president of the IAWS
- Vasilis Avramidis (born 1977), professional football defender
