= InsideWood =

Online resource and database

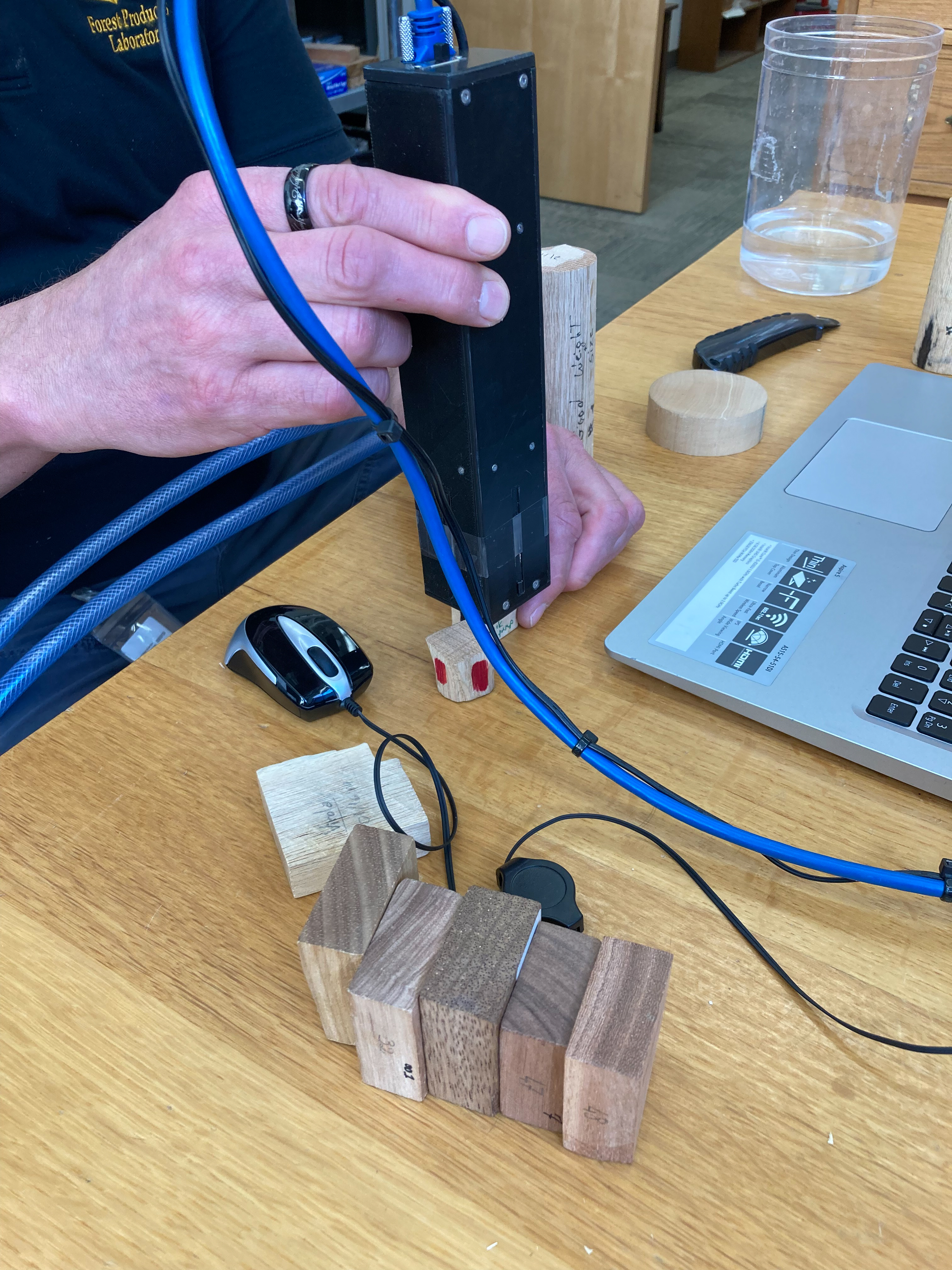
Wood identification in the lab.

InsideWood is an online resource and database for wood anatomy, serving as a reference, research, and teaching tool. Wood anatomy is a sub-area within the discipline of wood science.

This is a freely accessible database, which is also purely scientific and non-commercial. It was created by North Carolina State University Libraries in 2004, using funds from this University and the National Science Foundation, with the donation of wood anatomy materials by several international researchers and members of the IAWA, mostly botanists, biologists and wood scientists.

== Contents ==
The database contains categorized anatomical descriptions of wood based on the IAWA List of Microscopic Features for Hardwood and Softwood Identification, complemented by a comprehensive set of photomicrographs. As of November 2023, the database contained thousands of wood anatomical descriptions and nearly 66,000 photomicrographs of contemporary woods, along with more than 1,600 descriptions and 2,000 images of fossil woods. Its coverage is worldwide.

InsideWood is located at the North Carolina State University Libraries, and includes a collection with CITES-listed timber species and other woody plants. It helps the process of wood identification via a multi-entry key, which enables multiple searches, depending upon the presence or absence of specific IAWA features. Additionally, all the database functions as a virtual reference collection. The whole database contains materials from over 10,000 woody species and 200 plant families.

Initiator for this wood anatomy database has been the American botanist and wood scientist, Elisabeth Wheeler, former professor of the NCSU.

The database contains two distinctive menus for specific anatomical features of modern wood species:

- Softwoods
- Hardwoods

Identifying wood holds significance across several domains and is of critical importance for commercial, forensic, archaeological, and paleontological applications. Also, timber identification provides new tools needed for the tracking of illegal logging and transportation. Wood identification is also important from an economic point of view.
