= Journal of Wood Chemistry and Technology =

- Discipline: Wood chemistry, wood science, materials technology
- Language: English
- Edited by: John F. Kadla

Publication details
- History: 1981–present
- Publisher: Taylor & Francis on behalf of the Forest Products Society (United States)
- Frequency: Quarterly
- Open access: Hybrid
- Impact factor: 1.9 (2025)
- ISO 4: Find out here

Indexing
- ISSN: 0277-3813 (print); 1532-2440 (web)

Links
- Journal homepage; Online access; Online archive

The Journal of Wood Chemistry and Technology is a peer-reviewed scientific journal focusing on the chemistry, biochemistry, and processing of wood and lignocellulosic materials. It is published quarterly by Taylor & Francis on behalf of the Forest Products Society and has been in circulation since 1981.

The journal publishes original research articles, reviews, and technical notes on topics including wood chemistry, pulping, bleaching, adhesives, wood modification, composites, and bio-based materials. The current editor-in-chief of the journal is Dr. John F. Kadla.

The journal is indexed in major bibliographic databases such as Scopus, Chemical Abstracts Service, and Google Scholar. It has a Journal Citation Reports impact factor of 1.9 for 2025.

== See also ==
- Forest products
- Lignocellulosic biomass
- Wood science
