= BioResources =

- Discipline: Wood science; lignocellulosic materials; biotechnology
- Language: English
- Edited by: Lucian A. Lucia, Martin A. Hubbe

Publication details
- History: 2006–present
- Publisher: Department of Wood & Paper Science, North Carolina State University (United States)
- Frequency: Quarterly
- Open access: Hybrid
- Impact factor: 1.3 (2023)

Standard abbreviations
- ISO 4: BioResources

Indexing
- ISSN: 1930-2126

Links
- Journal homepage; Online archive; Journal information

The BioResources journal is a peer-reviewed scientific journal devoted to the science and engineering of lignocellulosic (including wood) materials, bioproducts, bioenergy, pulp and paper technology, composites, and related fields.

The journal is published quarterly by the Wood & Paper Science Department at North Carolina State University and has been in continuous publication since 2006. The current editors of the journal are Dr. Lucian A. Lucia and Dr. Martin A. Hubbe of the North Carolina State University.

According to the 2023 Journal Citation Reports, BioResources has an impact factor of 1.3, with a 5-year impact factor of 1.5, placing it in Q2 of the “Materials Science, Paper & Wood” category.

The journal is abstracted and indexed in major bibliographic databases, including:

- Web of Science (SCIE)
- Scopus
- Google Scholar

== See also ==
- Wood science
- Cellulose
- Biomaterials
- Forest products
- North Carolina State University
