= Klaus Richter =

German university professor emeritus and wood scientist

- Born: Klaus Richter; 1957 (age 68–69)
- Education: University of Hamburg
- Known for: Wood adhesion technologies, Life cycle assessment, Wood cascading use
- Scientific career
- Fields: Wood science and technology Bioeconomy
- Workplaces: Technical University of Munich; EMPA

Klaus Richter (born in 1957) is a German wood scientist and professor emeritus at the Technical University of Munich (TUM), who is an honorary fellow of the International Academy of Wood Science, editor-in-chief in the scientific journals, Wood Science and Technology and European Journal of Wood and Wood Products, and also, a member of the German Bioeconomy Council.

== Research career ==
Richter studied wood science at the University of Hamburg, earning his university diploma (Dipl.) in 1983. He completed a doctoral project funded by the German Research Foundation (DFG) on dendrochronology in the Iberian Peninsula, graduating in 1988. He spent one year for his post-doctoral research at the Forest Products Laboratory in Madison, Wisconsin, USA.

From 1987 to 2002, he was a research associate at EMPA, the Swiss Federal Laboratories for Materials Science and Technology. Between 2003 and 2011, he headed EMPA's Wood Department and also lectured at the ETH Zurich.

In April 2011, Richter was appointed full professor of wood science at Technical University of Munich (TUM) and became, in 2012, head of the university's, Wood Research Laboratory, coordinating since then several PhD works in the area of wood sciences. He retired from this position in October 2023.

== Recognition ==
The research work of Richter and his coworkers, has received international recognition in the area of wood science and technology. At Scopus, his published work has received over 5,000 citations.

Richter has been editor-in-chief of the journals Wood Science and Technology and European Journal of Wood and Wood Products, both published by Springer Nature.

His research encompasses the elucidation of structure-property relationships in wood to enhance adhesion, coating, and modification technologies, also focusing on the sustainability of wood and building industry processes, climate efficiency through modeling and transforming cascading and end-of-life processes.
