= Maderas: Ciencia y Tecnología =

- Discipline: Wood science, wood engineering, forest products
- Language: English
- Edited by: Rubén A. Ananías

Publication details
- History: 1998–present
- Publisher: Wood Engineering Department, University of Bío‑Bío (Chile)
- Frequency: Continuous (compiled quarterly)
- Open access: Hybrid
- Impact factor: 1.2 (2023)
- ISO 4: Find out here

Indexing
- ISSN: 0717-3644 (print); 0718-221X (web)

Links
- Journal homepage; Journal information; Online archive

Maderas: Ciencia y Tecnología is a peer-reviewed scientific journal published by the Wood Engineering Department of the University of Bío‑Bío (Chile). It covers research in wood science, wood engineering, forest products, wood chemistry, and related technologies.

The journal began publication in 1998 and operates as a continuous journal with quarterly print compilations. Maderas: Ciencia y Tecnología is bilingual journal where articles in Spanish and English are published. In 2018 was named third best among 750 journals from Iberoamerica in a ranking made by the Iberoamerican Network for Innovation and Scientific Knowledge.

The editor-in-chief is Dr. Rubén A. Ananías. The journal is indexed in major academic databases such as Web of Science, including the Science Citation Index Expanded, Scopus, SciELO, Chemical Abstracts Service, CAB Abstracts, and Google Scholar.

According to the 2023 Clarivate Journal Citation Reports, it has an impact factor of 1.2 with a 5‑year impact factor of 1.6, placing it in Q3 of the Materials Science: Paper & Wood category.

== See also ==
- Wood science
- Wood anatomy
- University of the Bío Bío
