= IAWA Journal =

Academic journal

- Discipline: Wood anatomy, Wood science, Plant science, Dendrology
- Language: English
- Edited by: Frederic Lens

Publication details
- History: 1980–present
- Publisher: Brill Publishers on behalf of the International Association of Wood Anatomists
- Frequency: Quarterly
- Impact factor: 1.4 (2023)

Standard abbreviations
- ISO 4: IAWA J.

Indexing
- ISSN: 0928-1541 (print); 2294-1932 (web)
- LCCN: 93648683
- OCLC no.: 30018452

Links
- Journal homepage; Online archive

IAWA Journal is a quarterly peer-reviewed scientific journal focusing on the structure and biology of wood and xylem tissues of woody plants. It is the official journal of the International Association of Wood Anatomists and is published by Brill Publishers.

The current editor-in-chief is Dr. Frederic Lens.

The journal was established in 1980 and continues the mission of promoting the science of wood anatomy worldwide. It publishes original research papers, review articles, and short communications related to wood structure, functional anatomy, dendrochronology, palaeobotany, systematics, tree biology, and allied fields.

IAWA Journal is abstracted and indexed in major bibliographic databases, including Scopus, Web of Science and Google Scholar. According to the Journal Citation Reports, it has a 2023 impact factor of 1.4.
