= Wood Research =

- Discipline: Wood science, timber engineering, materials science
- Language: English
- Edited by: Monika Stankovská, Štefan Šteller

Publication details
- History: 2003–present
- Publisher: State Forest Products Research Institute (Slovakia)
- Frequency: Quarterly
- Open access: Hybrid
- Impact factor: 0.9 (2023)
- ISO 4: Find out here

Indexing
- ISSN: 1336-4561 (print); 2729-8906 (web)

Links
- Journal homepage; Journal information / submission guidelines; Online archive

Wood Research is a peer-reviewed scientific journal focusing on developments in wood science, timber engineering, wood chemistry, and processing technologies. It is published quarterly by the State Forest Products Research Institute in Slovakia and has been in circulation since 2003.

The journal covers a broad range of topics including wood biology, physical and mechanical properties, wood chemistry, composite materials, timber processing, and biorefinery. It publishes original research articles, reviews, and technical reports. The current editors of the journal are Dr. Monika Stankovská and Dr. Štefan Šteller.

According to the latest data, Wood Research had a 2023 impact factor of 0.9. This figure was confirmed by Clarivate’s Journal Citation Reports in the category Material Science, Paper & Wood; the 5‑year impact factor is also listed as 0.9. The journal is indexed in major bibliographic databases such as Web of Science, Scopus, and Google Scholar.

== See also ==
- Wood science
- Biomaterials
