= Cellulose (journal) =

Academic journal

- Discipline: Polymer science, Materials science, Biochemistry
- Language: English
- Edited by: Alfred D. French

Publication details
- History: 1994–present
- Publisher: Springer Science+Business Media
- Frequency: Bimonthly
- Impact factor: 4.6 (2025)

Standard abbreviations
- ISO 4: Cellulose

Indexing
- ISSN: 0969-0239 (print); 1572-882X (web)

Links
- Journal homepage; Online archive

Cellulose is a bimonthly peer-reviewed scientific journal devoted to research on the chemistry, biochemistry, physics, and materials science of cellulose and related natural polymers. It covers both fundamental science and technological applications, including pulp, paper, textiles, and bio-based materials. The journal publishes original research articles, reviews, and technical notes.

Established in 1994, the journal is published by Springer Science+Business Media and features international research contributions spanning academia and industry. The current editor-in-chief is Alfred D. French.

The journal is abstracted and indexed in prominent databases including Scopus, Google Scholar, and Web of Science. According to Journal Citation Reports, it has a 2025 impact factor of 4.6.
