= Wood Science and Technology =

Academic journal

- Discipline: Wood science Wood technology
- Language: English
- Edited by: Klaus Richter; Jan-Willem van de Kuilen

Publication details
- History: 1967-present
- Publisher: Springer Nature (Germany)
- Frequency: Bimonthly
- Impact factor: 3.1 (2023)

Standard abbreviations
- ISO 4: Wood Sci. Technol.

Indexing
- ISSN: 0043-7719 (print); 1432-5225 (web)

Links
- Journal homepage; Online access; Online archive

Wood Science and Technology is a bimonthly peer-reviewed scientific journal which covers all aspects of wood science and technology. It is published by Springer Nature and the editors are Klaus Richter and Jan-Willem van de Kuilen, both of the Technical University of Munich.

The journal was established in 1967 and since then, it is the official journal of the International Academy of Wood Science.

== Abstracting and indexing ==
The journal is abstracted and indexed in:

- CAB Abstracts
- Current Contents/Engineering, Computing & Technology
- EBSCO databases
- Ei Compendex
- Inspec
- ProQuest databases
- Science Citation Index Expanded
- Scopus

According to the Journal Citation Reports, the journal has a 2023 impact factor of 3.1.
