= Holzforschung =

Academic journal

- Discipline: Wood research and technology
- Language: English
- Edited by: Lennart Salmén

Publication details
- History: 1947-present
- Publisher: De Gruyter Brill (Germany)
- Frequency: Monthly
- Open access: Yes
- Impact factor: 2.2 (2023)

Standard abbreviations
- ISO 4: Holzforschung

Indexing
- ISSN: 0018-3830 (print); 1437-434X (web)

Links
- Journal homepage

Holzforschung is a monthly peer-reviewed scientific journal covering all aspects of wood research and technology. It is published by De Gruyter Brill, with Lennart Salmén (KTH Royal Institute of Technology) serving as the editor-in-chief.

The journal was established in January 1947, originally publishing exclusively in German. In 1955, the journal expanded its language options to include French and English. In 1993, it transitioned to publishing solely in English.

== Abstracting and indexing ==
The journal is abstracted and indexed in:

- CAB Abstracts
- Science Citation Index Expanded
- Scopus

According to the Journal Citation Reports, the journal has a 2023 impact factor of 2.2.
