= International Wood Products Journal =

Academic journal

- Discipline: Wood science
- Language: English
- Edited by: Dennis Jones

Publication details
- Former name: Journal of the Institute of Wood Science
- History: 1958–present
- Publisher: Sage Publishing
- Frequency: Quarterly
- Impact factor: 1.1 (2022)

Standard abbreviations
- ISO 4: Int. Wood Prod. J.

Indexing
- ISSN: 2042-6445 (print); 2042-6453 (web)
- LCCN: 2011229017
- OCLC no.: 855730263
- Journal of the Institute of Wood Science
- ISSN: 0020-3203

Links
- Journal homepage; Online access; Online archive

International Wood Products Journal is a quarterly peer-reviewed scientific journal covering research in wood science, engineering, and related technologies. It is published by Sage Publishing on behalf of the Wood Technology Society, part of the Institute of Materials, Minerals and Mining.

The editor-in-chief of the journal is Dr. Dennis Jones, who took over the role in 2024 from Mr Gervais Sawyer, who had been editor since 2010.

The journal was established in 1958 as the Journal of the Institute of Wood Science and adopted its current title in 2010 following the integration of the Institute of Wood Science into IOM3. Since 2024, it has been published by Sage, following an agreement with IOM3.

The journal is abstracted and indexed in major scientific databases and has an impact factor of 1.1 as of 2022.
