= European Journal of Wood and Wood Products =

Academic journal

- Discipline: Wood science and technology
- Language: English
- Edited by: Klaus Richter, Jan-Willem van de Kuilen

Publication details
- Former name: Holz als Roh- und Werkstoff
- History: 1937–present
- Publisher: Springer Science+Business Media
- Frequency: Bimonthly
- Impact factor: 2.4 (2023)

Standard abbreviations
- ISO 4: Eur. J. Wood Wood Prod.

Indexing
- CODEN: EJWWAD
- ISSN: 0018-3768 (print); 1436-736X (web)
- LCCN: 2011220164
- OCLC no.: 310819526

Links
- Journal homepage; Online archive

European Journal of Wood and Wood Products is a bimonthly peer-reviewed scientific journal covering all aspects of wood science and technology. It is published by Springer and the editors-in-chief are Klaus Richter and Jan-Willem van de Kuilen (Technical University of Munich). The journal was established in 1937.

== Abstracting and indexing ==
The journal is abstracted and indexed in:

- CAB Abstracts
- Current Contents/Engineering, Computing & Technology
- EBSCO databases
- Ei Compendex
- Inspec
- ProQuest databases
- Science Citation Index Expanded
- Scopus

According to the Journal Citation Reports, the journal has a 2023 impact factor of 2.4.
