= International Association of Wood Anatomists =

Biology association based in the Netherlands

The International Association of Wood Anatomists (IAWA) is an association that studies wood anatomy formed in 1931. Their office is currently based in the Netherlands.

They have been cited as a source by Mongabay, used as a supporting reference in plant biology books and their activities have been talked about by ABC Online.

The official journal of the International Association of Wood Anatomists is the IAWA Journal.

== Bibliography ==
- 1962: International glossary of terms used in wood anatomy
- 1964: Multilingual Glossary of Terms Used in Wood Anatomy
- 1980: Wood Identification: An Annotated Bibliography
- 1981 (August, reprinted March 2013): New Perspectives in Wood Anatomy: Published on the Occasion of the 50th Anniversary of the International Association of Wood Anatomists
- 1989: IAWA List of Microscopic Features for Hardwood Identification
- 1994: Directory of Members
- 1996: Recent advances in wood anatomy
- 1999: Dendrochronology in monsoon Asia: proceedings of a Workshop on Southeast Asian Dendrochronology held in Chiang Mai, Thailand, 16–20 February 1998
- 2004: IAWA list of microscopic features for softwood identification

=== Bulletins ===
- 1985: IAWA Bulletin, Volumes 6-7
- 1989: IAWA Bulletin, Volume 10
- 1990: IAWA Bulletin, Volume 11
- 1991: IAWA Bulletin, Volume 12

=== Journals ===
- 1993: IAWA Journal, Volume 14
- 1994: IAWA Journal, Volume 15
- volume 16 info needed
- 1997: IAWA Journal, Volume 17
- 1997: IAWA Journal, Volume 18
- 1998: IAWA Journal, Volume 19
- volumes 20 to 26 info needed
- 2006: IAWA Journal, Volume 27
- 2007: IAWA Journal, Volume 28
- 2008: IAWA Journal, Volume 29
