= Wood science =

Scientific discipline

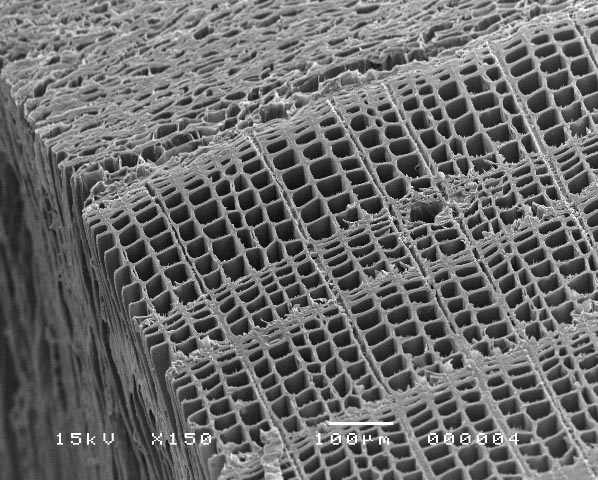
Spruce wood (Picea abies) as shown in SEM

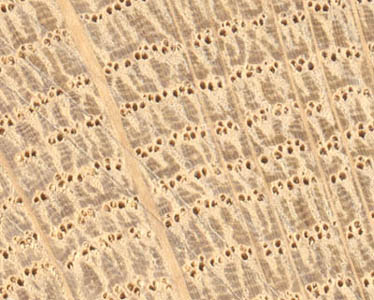
Oak wood (Quercus robur) with characteristic rows of vessels

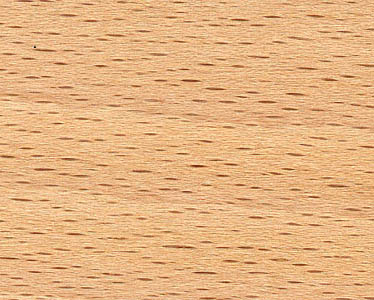
Beech wood (Fagus sylvatica) with rays in the tangential direction

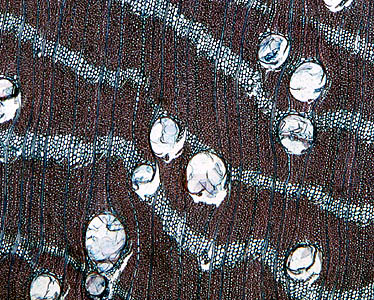
Common fig (Ficus sycomorus) xylem with axial banded parenchyma in light microscopy

Wood science is the scientific field which studies and investigates the formation, physical and chemical composition, and macro- and microstructure of wood as a bio-based and lignocellulosic material. Wood science additionally covers the biological, chemical, physical, and mechanical properties and characteristics of wood as a natural material.

It is an interdisciplinary field combining fundamental aspects of biology, chemistry, physics, and engineering to understand and utilise wood in various applications.

Wood science has applications in wood processing, construction and the production of materials and products such as particleboard, fiberboard, OSB, plywood, pulpwood, furniture and engineered wood products including glued laminated timber, CLT, LVL, PSL, pellets and briquettes.

== History ==
Initial comprehensive investigations in the field of wood science emerged at the start of the 20th century. In 1902, the Wood Processing Laboratory was founded in the Department of Forestry at Tokyo University and academic studies on wood processing were first initiated. The Forest and Forest Products Research Institute in Tokyo was also established in 1905. In 1906 the Forest Products Research Institute was created in Dehradun, India.

The advent of contemporary wood research commenced in 1910, when the Forest Products Laboratory (FPL) was established in Madison, Wisconsin, US The Forest Products Laboratory played a fundamental role in wood science providing scientific research on wood and wood products in partnership with academia, industry, local and other institutions in North and South America and worldwide.

In the following years, several wood research institutes came into existence across almost all industrialized nations. A general overview of these wood institutes and laboratories is shown below:

- 1913: Institute of Wood and Pulp Chemistry Eberswalde (today's Eberswalde University for Sustainable Development), Germany
- 1913: Forest Products Laboratory Montreal, Canada
- 1918: Forest Products Laboratory Vancouver, Canada
- 1919: Forest Products Laboratory Melbourne, Australia
- 1923: Department of Mechanics and Wood Technology, University of Sopron, Hungary
- 1923: Forest Products Research Laboratory, Princes Risborough, Great Britain
- 1929: Institute for Wood Science and Technology, Leningrant, St. Petersburg, USSR
- 1933: Centre Technique du Bois, Paris, France
- 1936: Wood Department of the Swiss Federal Laboratories for Materials Testing in Zurich (today's Swiss Federal Laboratories for Materials Science and Technology), Switzerland
- 1942: Laboratory of Wood Technology Helsinki, Finland
- 1944: Swedish Forest Products Research Laboratory, former TRÄTEK (today's Research Institutes of Sweden), Sweden
- 1946: Latvian Academy of Sciences, Institute of Wood Chemistry, Latvia
- 1946: Institute for Wood Research, iVTH (today's Fraunhofer Institute for Wood Research), Germany
- 1947: State Wood Research Institute Bratislava, Slovakia
- 1947: Forest Research Institute – Rotorua (today's Scion), New Zealand
- 1948: Austrian Wood Research Institute Vienna (today's Holzforschung Austria), Austria
- 1949: Norwegian Institute of Wood Technology, Norway
- 1950: Federal Institute for Forestry and Forest Products (today's Johann Heinrich von Thünen Institute), Germany
- 1952: Institute for Wood Technology and Fibers (today's Institute for Wood Technology Dresden), Germany
- 1952: Institute for Wood Research and Wood Technology (today's Wood Research Munich), Germany
- 1954: Faculty of Wood Technology, Poznan University (today's Faculty of Forestry and Wood Technology at Poznan), Poland.

From the '60s, the founding of research institutes in the field of wood sciences continued in many universities, and also in universities of applied sciences, and technological universities.

Today, the International Academy of Wood Science (known as IAWS), a widely recognised and non-profit assembly of wood and wood-related scientists, represents worldwide the scientific area of wood science and technology, and all of its associated technological domains.

== Sub-areas ==
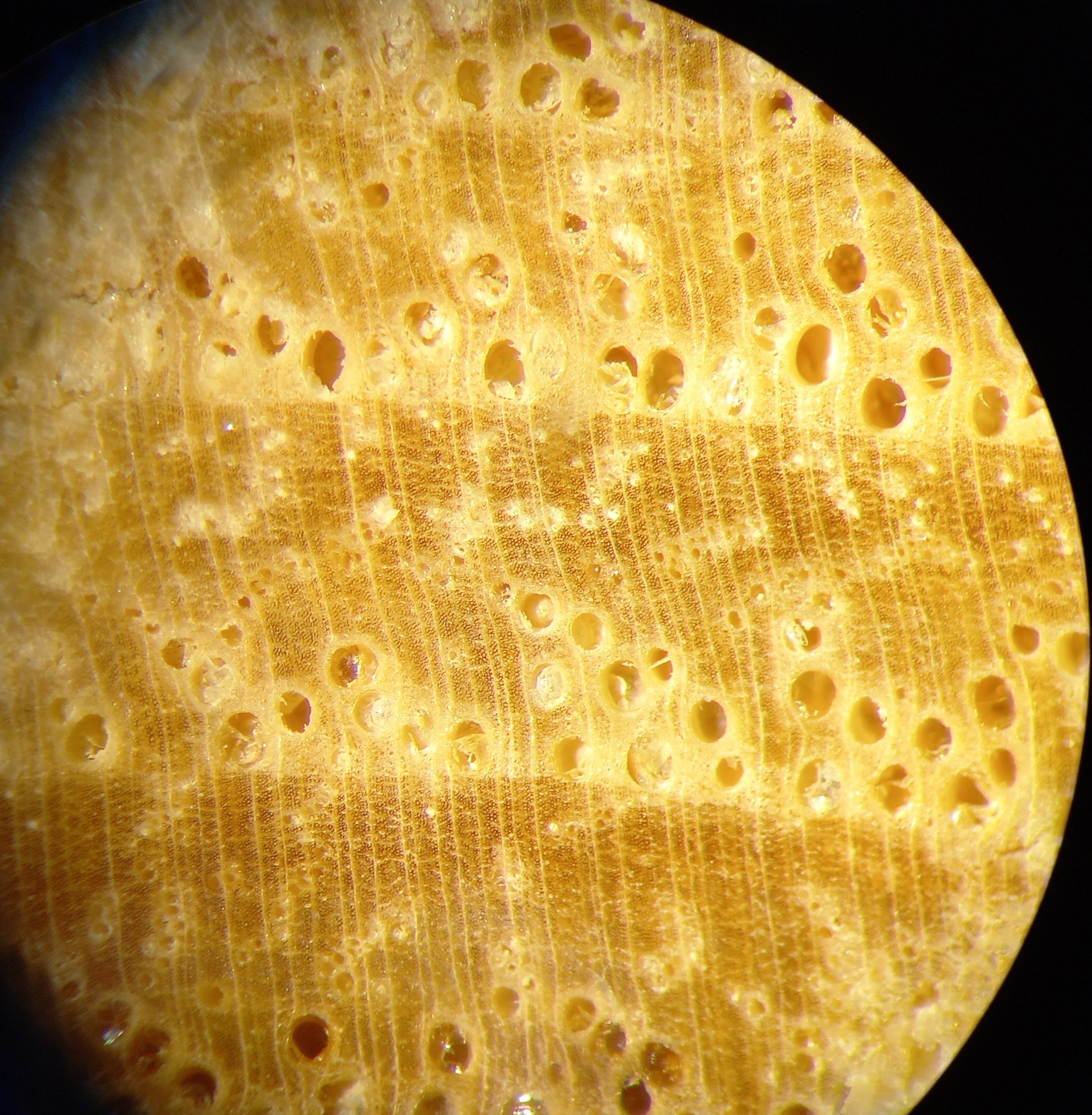
In wood biology, different wood elements are studied under the microscope

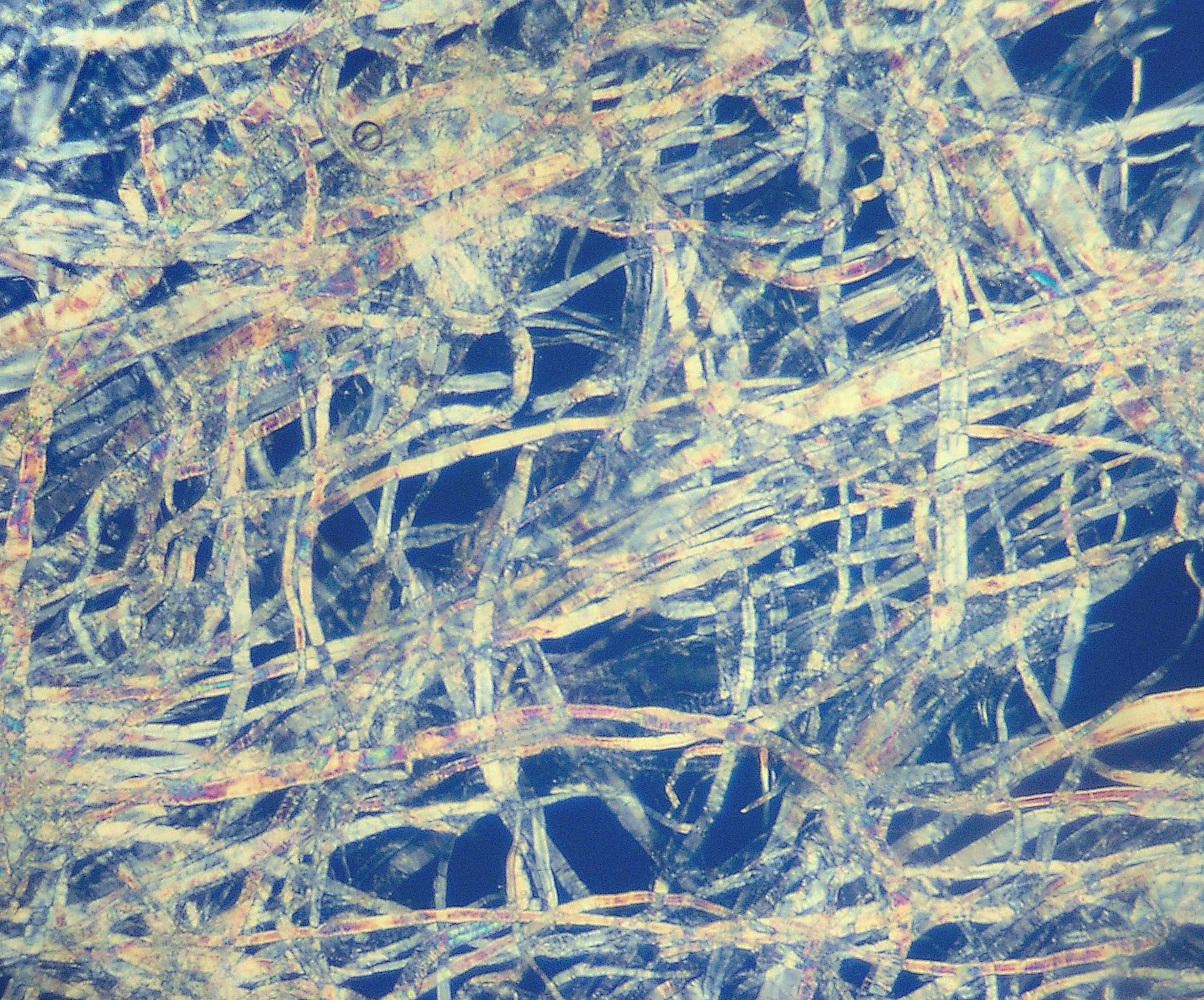
Through wood chemistry, pulp, is produced via the alkaline Kraft process

The field of wood science can be categorized into three distinct main sub-areas, which include:

- Wood biology, a subset of wood science which focuses on the formation, structure and composition of wood tissues. It involves investigations conducted at the macroscopic, microscopic, and molecular levels. Additionally, this sub-field encompasses wood anatomy which involves the (macroscopic - microscopic) identification of various wood species.
- Wood chemistry, whose primary focus is the analysis of the chemical constituents comprising wood, with specific emphasis on cellulose, lignin, hemicelluloses, and extractives, as well as on the various products derived from these components. It is also explores potential uses for pulp and paper production, the utilization of wood and wood waste, the generation of energy and chemicals from pulping byproducts, and the conversion of biomass.
- Wood physics, which constitutes an essential component of the field of wood science, building upon discoveries in wood chemistry, wood anatomy (xylem), and biology, as well as principles from classical physics, mechanics, and materials strength. Wood physics encompasses critical research areas including: a) examining wood behaviour in relation to moisture, which involves fundamental aspects of moisture absorption, swelling, and shrinkage, b) investigating the impact of temperature on wood properties, encompassing heat conduction and heat storage, and c) assessing the mechanical, rheological, and acoustic properties and qualities of both wood and wood-based products.
Some indicative examples involving fundamental principles of wood sciences

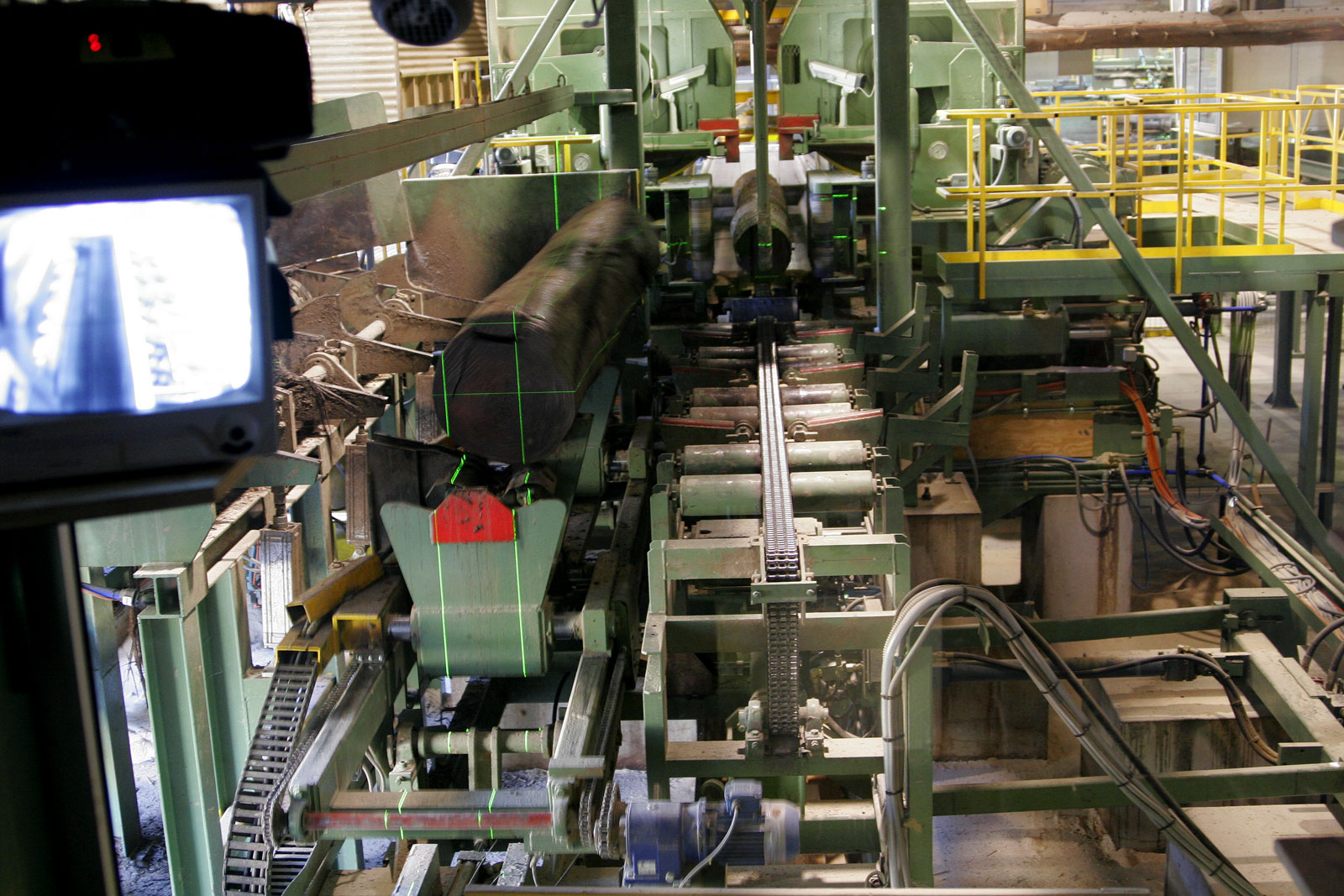
Inside a modern sawmill equipped with laser-guided technology. Following logging, it all commences with the sawmilling of round timber.

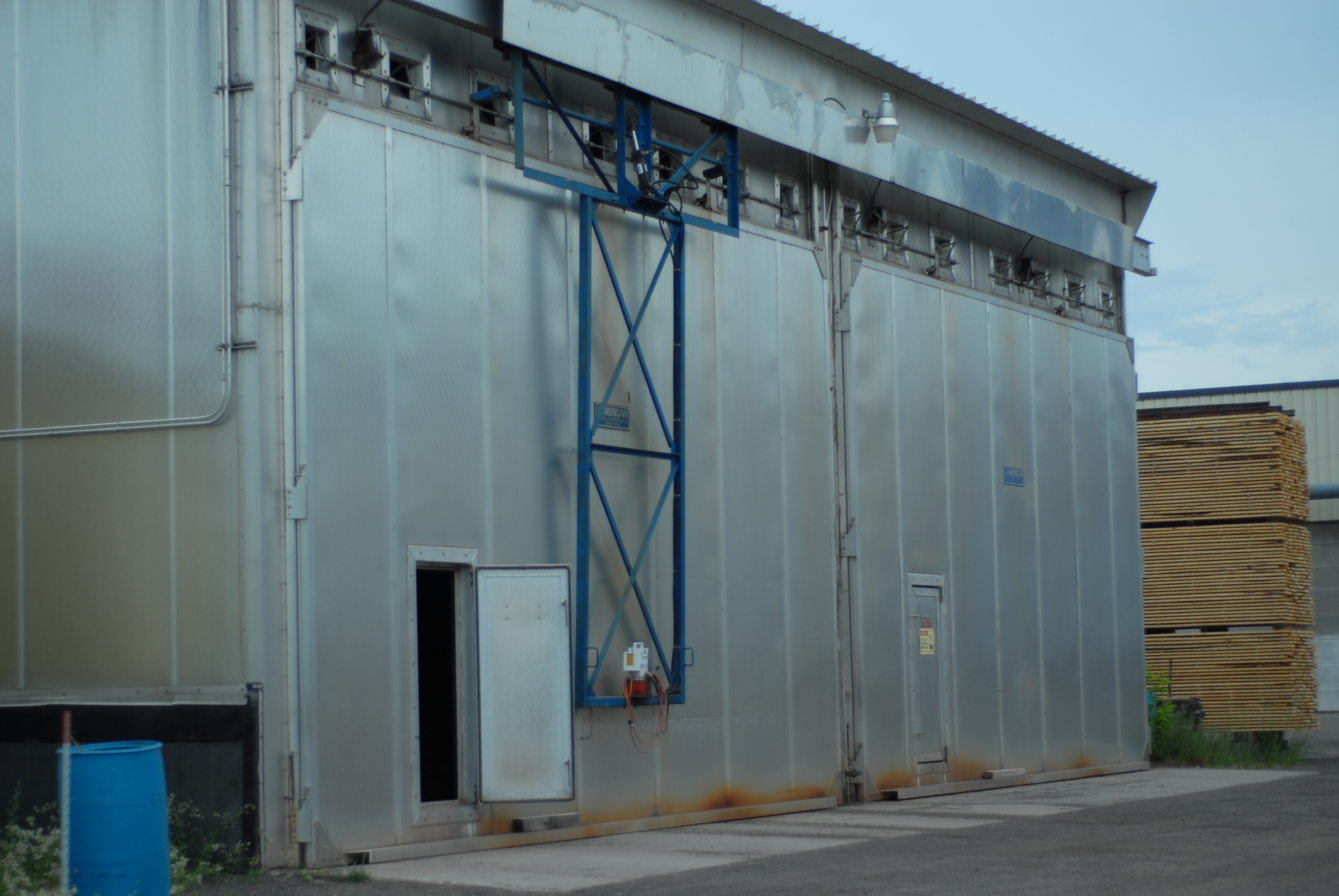
A kiln dryer is typically utilized in the drying of green timber, applying a procedure which involves basic principles of physics.

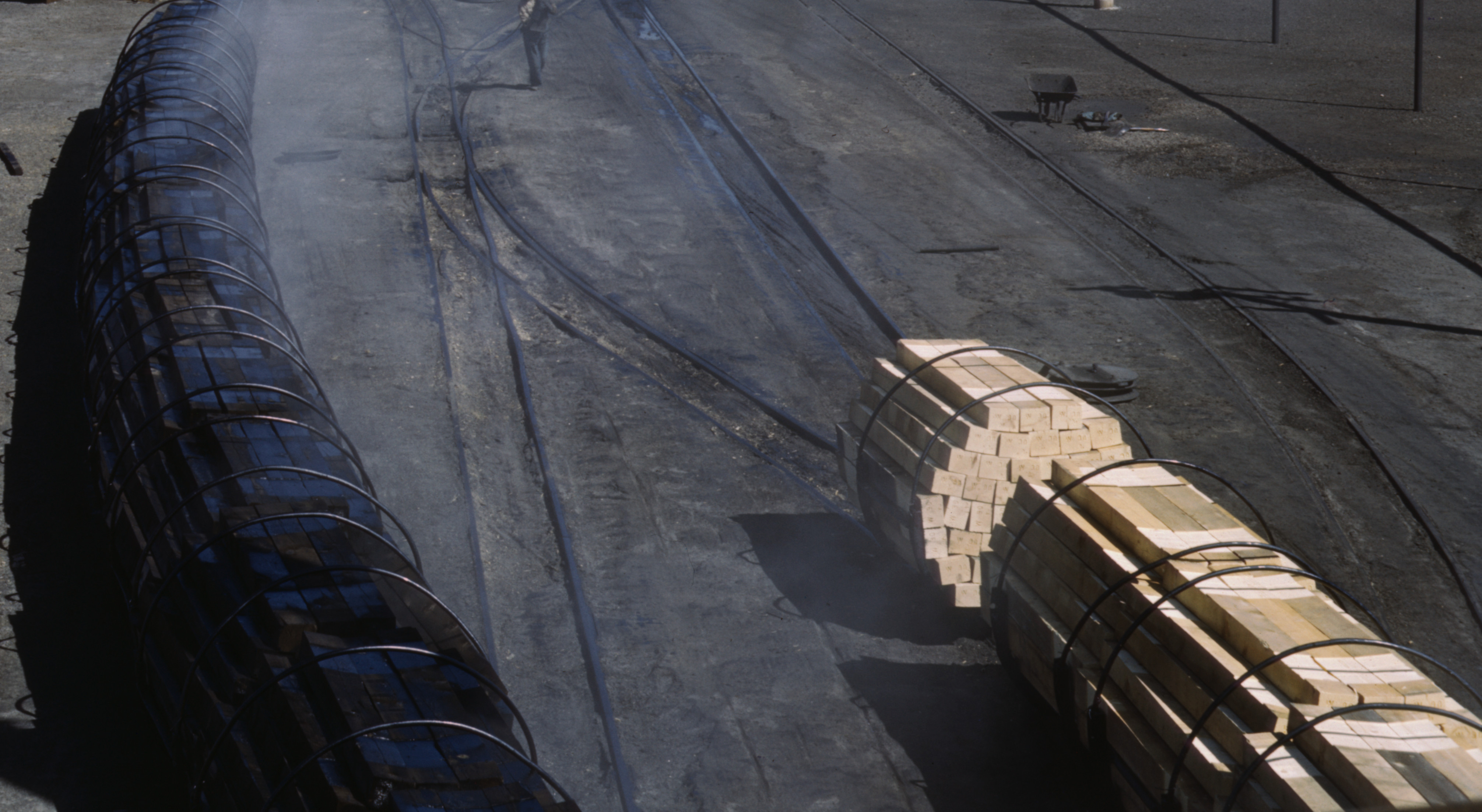
Railroad wooden ties that are fully impregnated with creosote through a process known as pressure treatment, which is a common method for preserving wood.

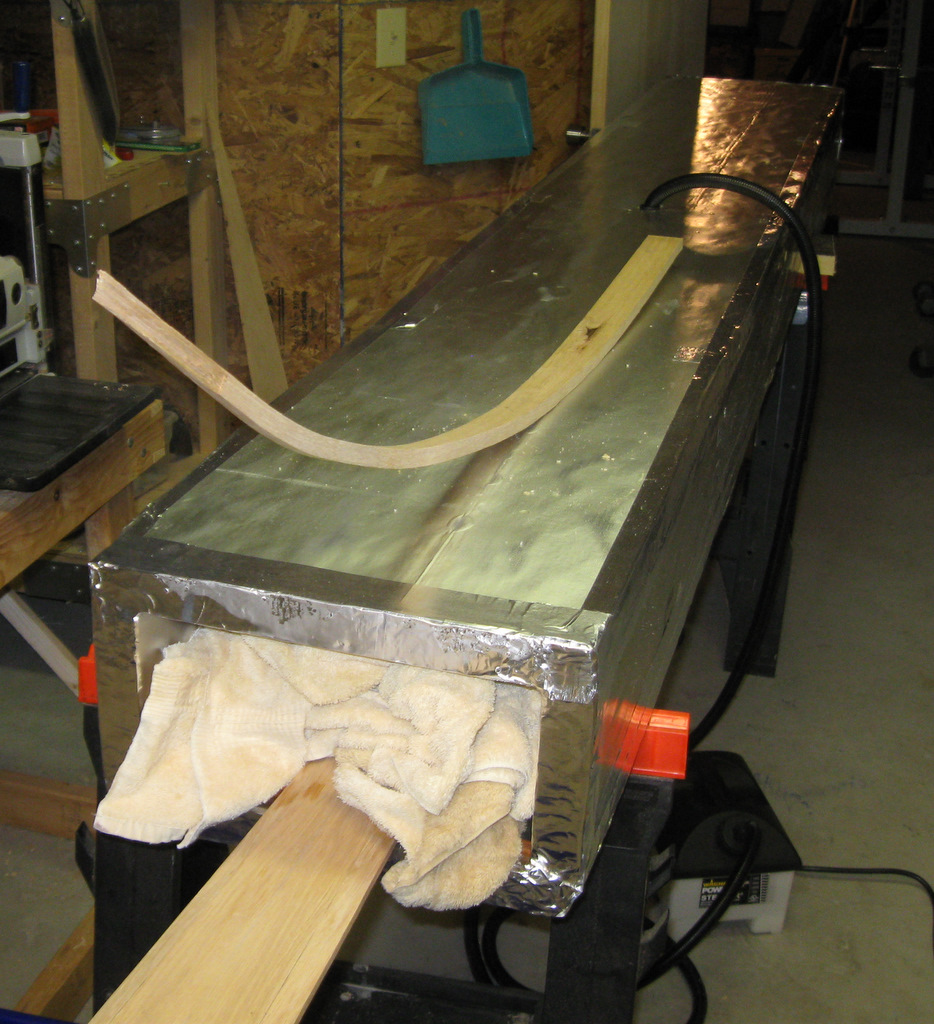
Steam bending is a woodworking technique, under which, wood is exposed to steam and its basic polymer, lignin is softened.

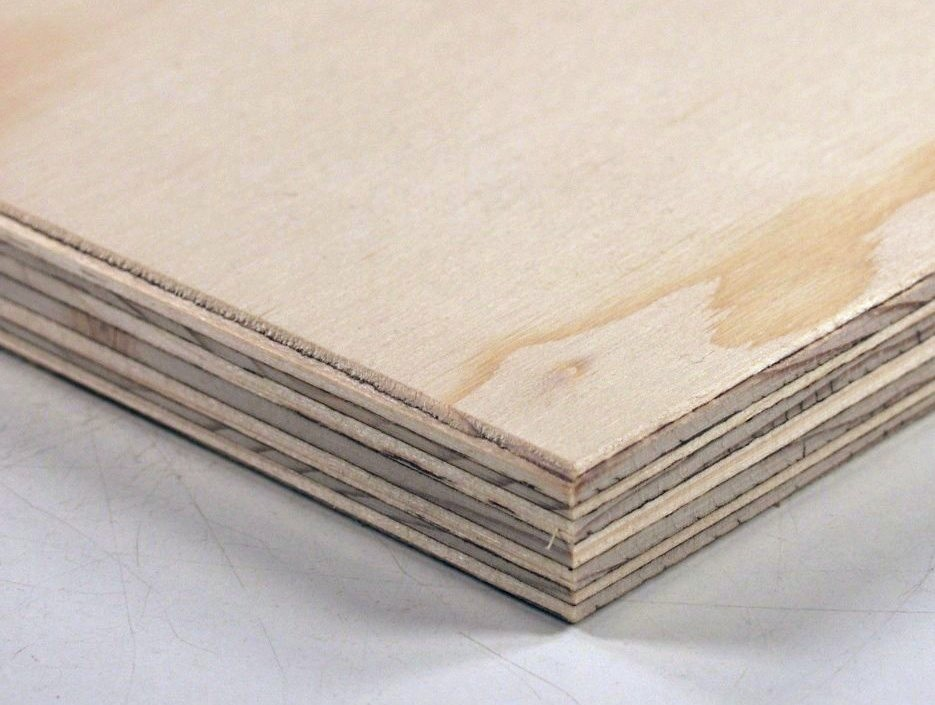
Plywood, a wood panel typically bonded with formaldehyde-based resins (UF, PF), is widely utilized for interior and exterior applications.

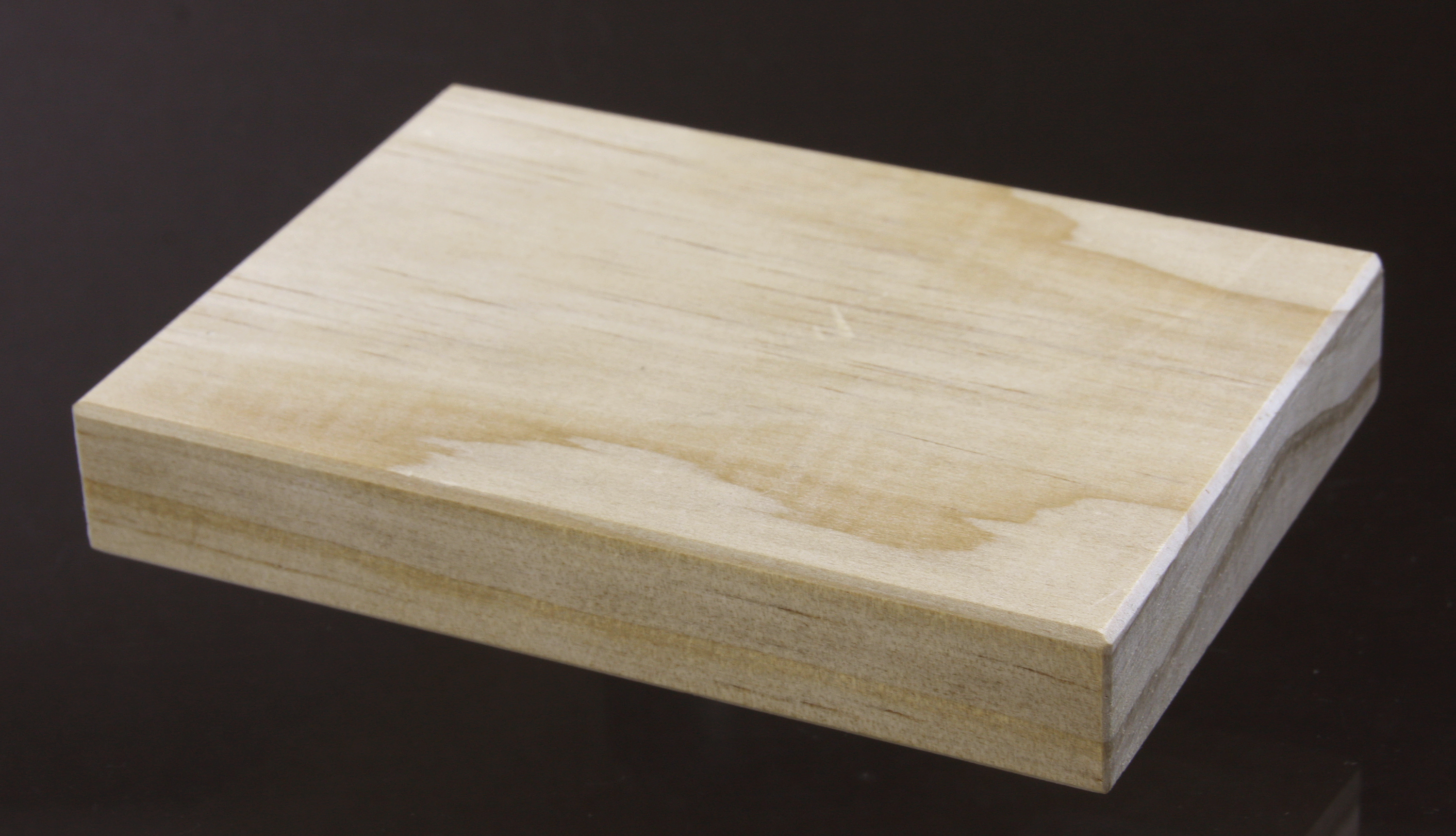
Specimen of acetylated wood (Accoya) resulting from the acetylation reaction of wood and acetic anhydride represents a novel development following decades of research.

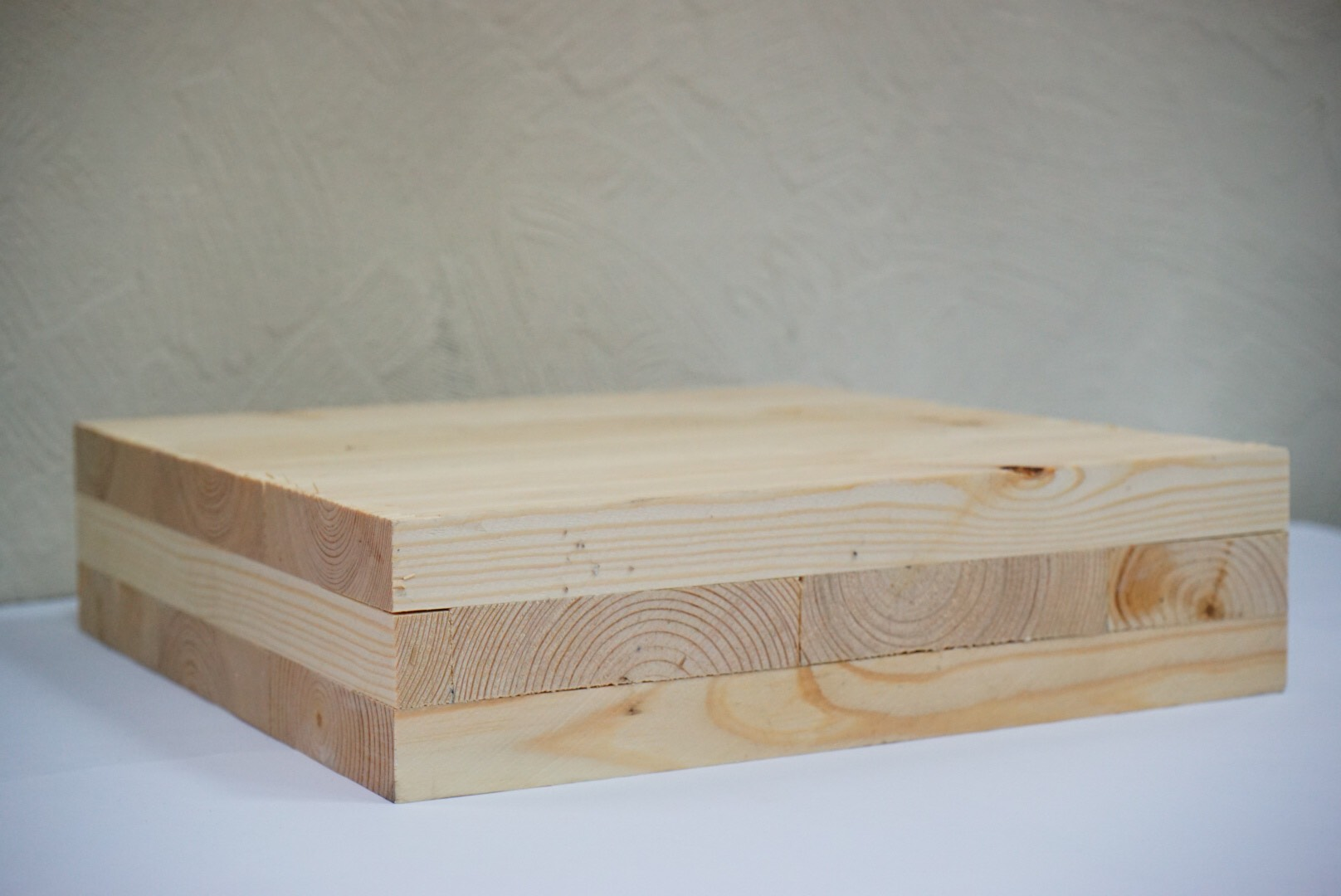
Specimen of cross-laminated timber (CLT), a novel engineered wood product for big construction projects (i.e. buildings), which was developed during the ‘90s.

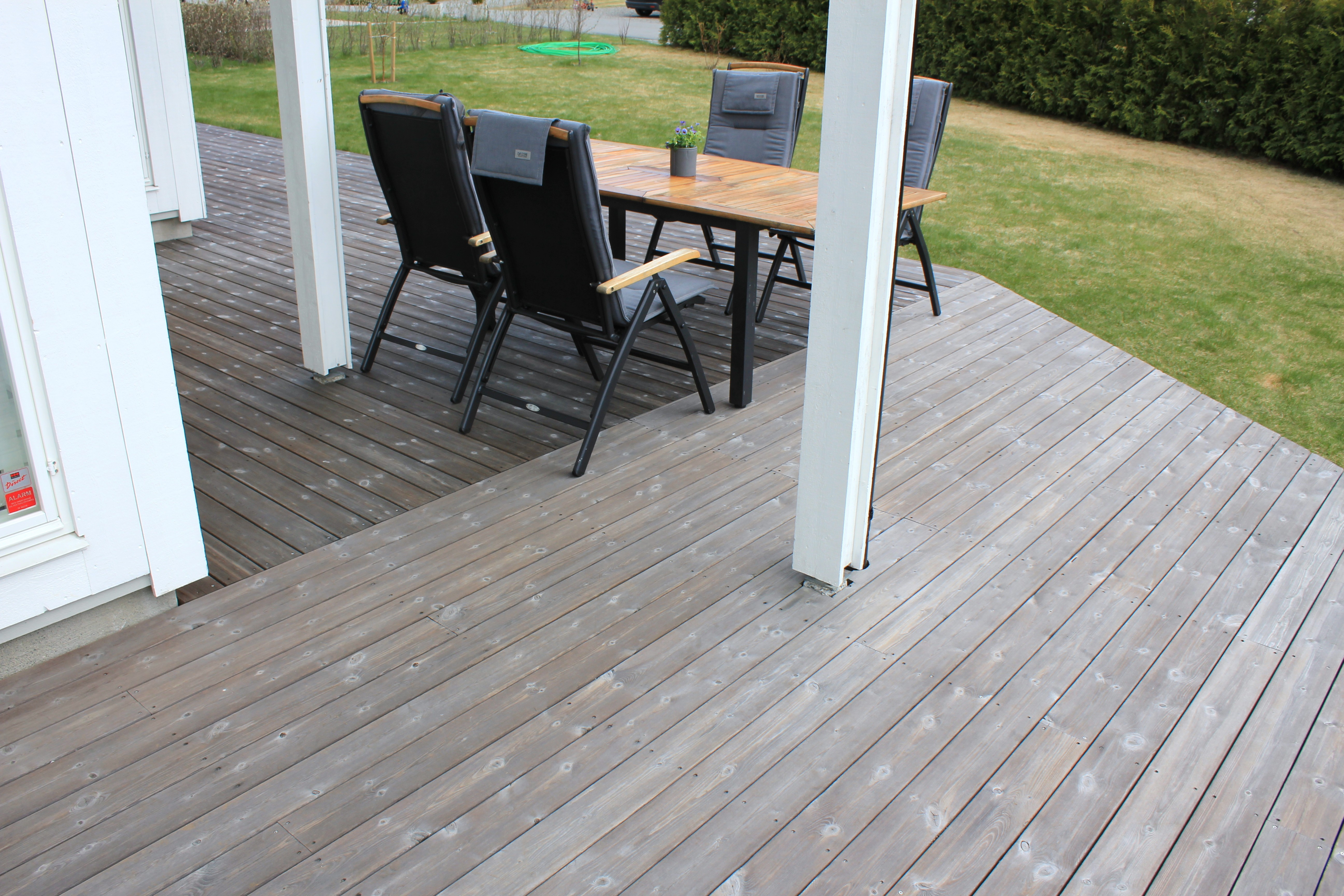
Terrace built with furfurylated wood (Kebony) resulting from the chemical modification of pine wood by furfuryl alcohol; this presents today a novel green technology.

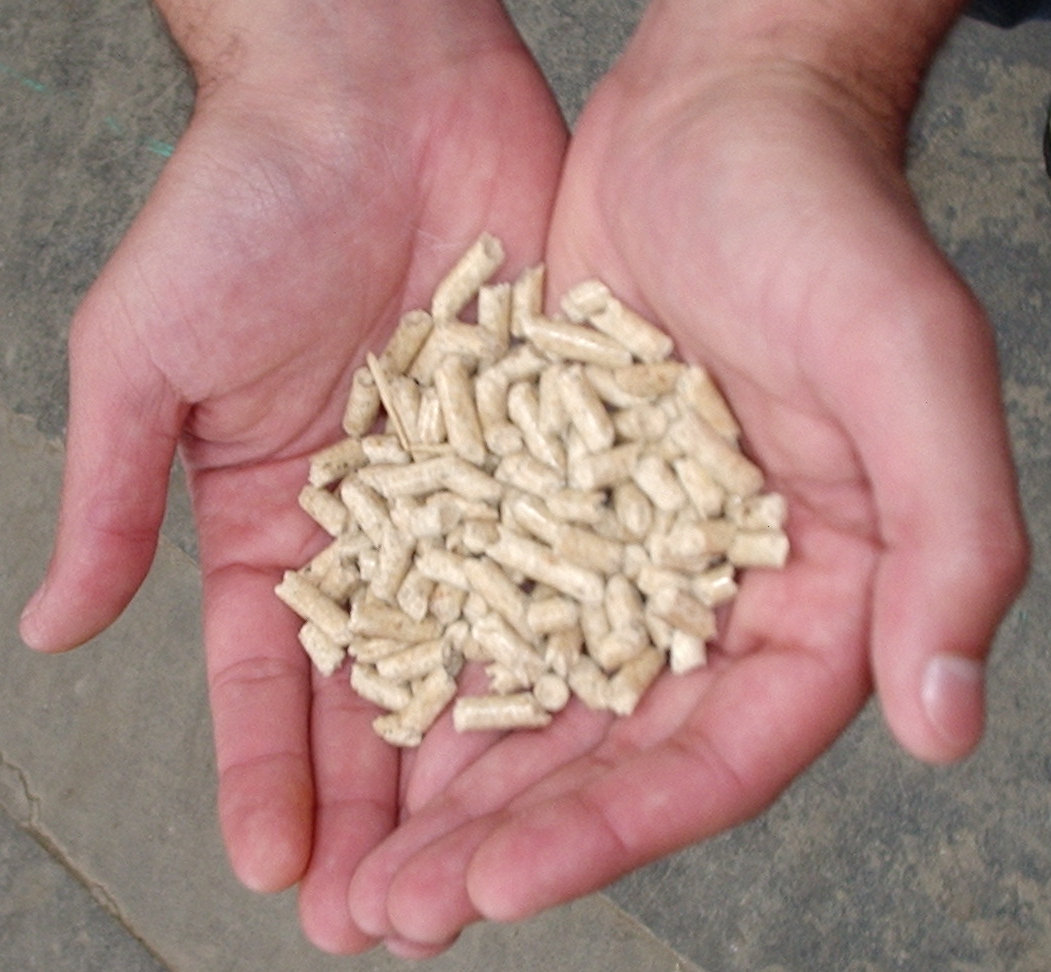
Wood pellets, a type of important solid fuel nowadays, is produced from compressed wood residues through pelletizing, involving the softening of lignin.

== Scientific journals ==
Below is a list of the referred scientific journals within the area of wood sciences:

- Holzforschung
- European Journal of Wood and Wood Products
- Wood Science and Technology
- Wood Material Science and Engineering
- Cellulose
- Mokuzai Gakkaishi
- Journal of Wood Science
- BioResources
- IAWA Journal
- Maderas: Ciencia y Tecnología
- Wood Research
- Journal of Wood Chemistry and Technology
- Forest Products Journal
- Wood and Fiber Science
- Journal of the Korean Wood Science and Technology
- International Wood Products Journal
- Drvna Industrija
- Drewno
- Journal of the Indian Academy of Wood Science
- Iranian Journal of Wood and Paper Industries
