= Forest product =

Material derived from forestry

A forest product is any material derived from forestry for direct consumption or commercial use, such as lumber, paper, or fodder for livestock. Wood, by far the dominant product of forests, is used for many purposes, such as wood fuel (e.g. in form of firewood or charcoal) or the finished structural materials used for the construction of buildings, or as a raw material, in the form of wood pulp, that is used in the production of paper. All other non-wood products derived from forest resources, comprising a broad variety of other forest products, are collectively described as non-timber forest products (NTFP). Non-timber forest products are viewed to have fewer negative effects on forest ecosystem when providing income sources for local community.

Production of five non-wood forest products, 2000–2022.

Globally, about 1,150,000,000 ha (2.8×10^{9} acres) of forest is managed primarily for the production of wood and non-wood forest products. In addition, 749,000,000 ha (1.85×10^{9} acres) is designated for multiple use, which often includes production.

Worldwide, the area of forest designated primarily for production has been relatively stable since 1990, but the area of multiple-use forest has decreased by about 71,000,000 ha (180,000,000 acres).

In 2023, the global export value of wood and paper products reached US$482 billion. Industrial roundwood removals amounted to 1.92 billion cubic meters. Global sawnwood production totaled 445 million cubic meters.

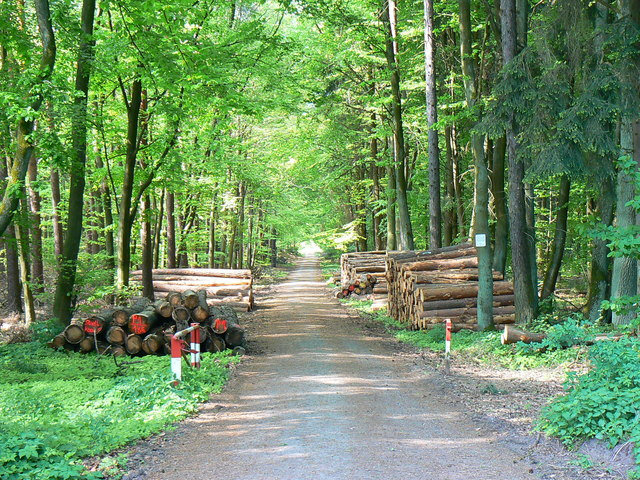
Forest Log Piles

== Forest products data ==
The Food and Agriculture Organization of the United Nations publishes an annual yearbook of forest products. The FAO Yearbook of Forest Products is a compilation of statistical data on basic forest products for all countries and territories of the world. It contains series of annual data on the volume of production and the volume and value of trade in forest products. It includes tables showing direction of trade and average unit values of trade for certain products. Statistical information in the yearbook is based primarily on data provided to the FAO Forestry Department by the countries through questionnaires or official publications. In the absence of official data, FAO makes an estimate based on the best information available. FAO also publishes an annual survey of pulp and paper production capacities around the world. The survey presents statistics on pulp and paper capacity and production by country and by grade. The statistics are based on information submitted by correspondents worldwide, most of them pulp and paper associations, and represents 85% of the world production of paper and paperboard.

Based on these demands, the forest products can be further explored. Pulp and paper industry has high volume demand for the wood materials including both softwood and hardwood. Wood industry can consume large volume and varieties of wood products including logs, lumbers, furniture, and other products.

== Producing forest resources ==
Producers of forest products are heavily depending on the forest types and ownership (see Forest). As woods are the dominant product of the forest product, the processes of producing wood products are important. The general processes for commercial land can include seedling production, site preparation, planting, applying fertilizers and herbicides, thinning (pre-commercial or commercial), and logging. The processes may vary due to different species and spatial locations. Products category may include logs, lumbers, residues, etc. Another forest product called biochar can be produced from logging residues. For non-timber forest products, the processes can have a large variety.

== Forest products in sustainability ==
In 2015, the United Nations set 17 Sustainable Development Goals (SDG) as global goals from 2015 to 2030. As renewable resources on earth, forest products can assist in several SDGs in this agenda.

=== Zero hunger ===
As forest products can provide a large variety of foods (e.g. nuts, fruits, sugar), hunger issue can be addressed by properly managing the forest.

=== Good health and well-being for people ===
Forests not only sequester carbon dioxide and provide oxygen but also play an essential role in our ecosystem. Forests are crucial to avoid soil erosion, control pollutants, balance the eco-system, and so on.

=== Affordable and clean energy ===
Forest products, including wood chips and forest residues, can be converted to bioethanol, biofuel, biogas, and other bioenergy sources (see also Bioenergy). Common conversion technologies can contain fermentation, pyrolysis, gasification, and other technologies. These renewable energy sources can be a substitute for traditional fossil fuels.

FAO, which supported the classification of wood pellets in 2012 and has tracked them ever since, has found production jumping nearly 150 percent to 44 million tonnes by 2021: it largely ascribes this expansion to rising demand driven by the European Commission's bioenergy targets.

=== Climate action ===
Forest products can work towards reducing global warming trends when sourced in sustainably managed forests. One core idea is that forest products themselves are storage for carbon dioxide. First, as mentioned above, bioenergy can replace fossil energy and reduce the greenhouse gas emissions although its combustion initially produces more GHG than fossil fuels per unit of produced energy: it takes several decades or even centuries for new trees to re-absorb the carbon emitted by burning their predecessors. Second, timbers from forest can be sustainable construction materials. Rather than concrete that is hard for degradation and recycled, structural timbers can be recycled for re-use or for biodegradation.

== Resource pressures ==
Many forest management policies have been implemented that impact forest product economics, including forest access restrictions, harvesting fees, and harvest limits. Deforestation, global warming and other environmental concerns have increasingly affected the availability and sustainability of forest products, as well as the economies of regions dependent upon forestry around the world. In recent years, the idea of sustainable forestry, which aims to preserve crop yields without causing irreversible damage to ecosystem health, has changed the relationship between environmentalists and the forest products industry. Stakeholders in the forest products industry include government departments, commercial enterprises, non-governmental organizations (NGOs), policy-makers and analysts, private and international organizations.

== See also ==
- Agroforestry
- Board foot
- Clearcutting
- Cord (volume)
- Forest management
- Forest Stewardship Council (FSC)
- International Wood Products Journal
- Lumber yard
- Outline of forestry
- Programme for the Endorsement of Forest Certification (PEFC)
- Silviculture
- Stere
- Sustainable Forestry Initiative (SFI)

== Sources ==
This article incorporates text from a free content work. Licensed under CC BY-SA 3.0 (license statement/permission). Text taken from Global Forest Resources Assessment 2020 Key findings, FAO, FAO.
