= Wood anatomy =

Scientific subject in botany

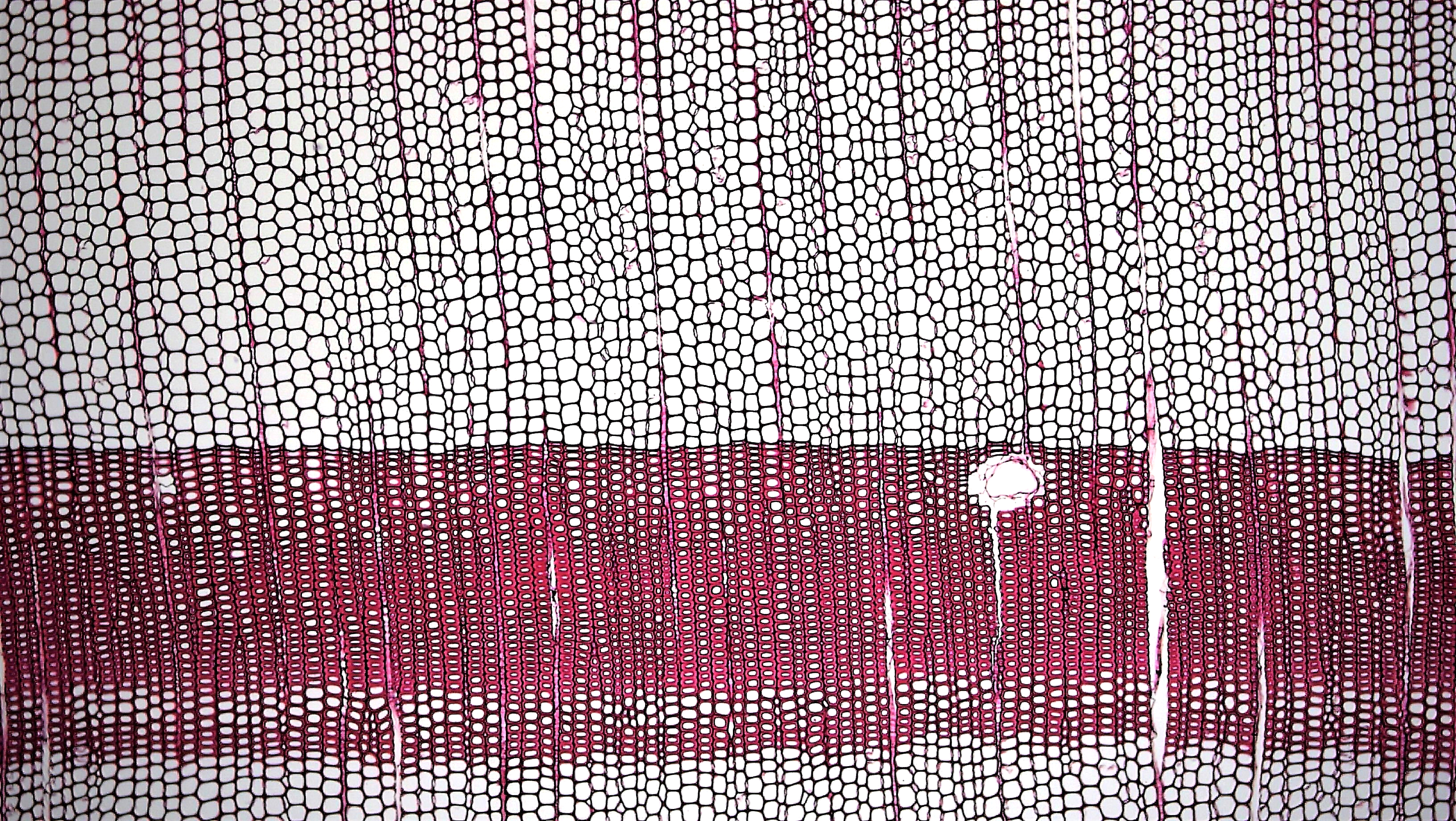
The typical microstructure of Pine wood with plenty of tracheids

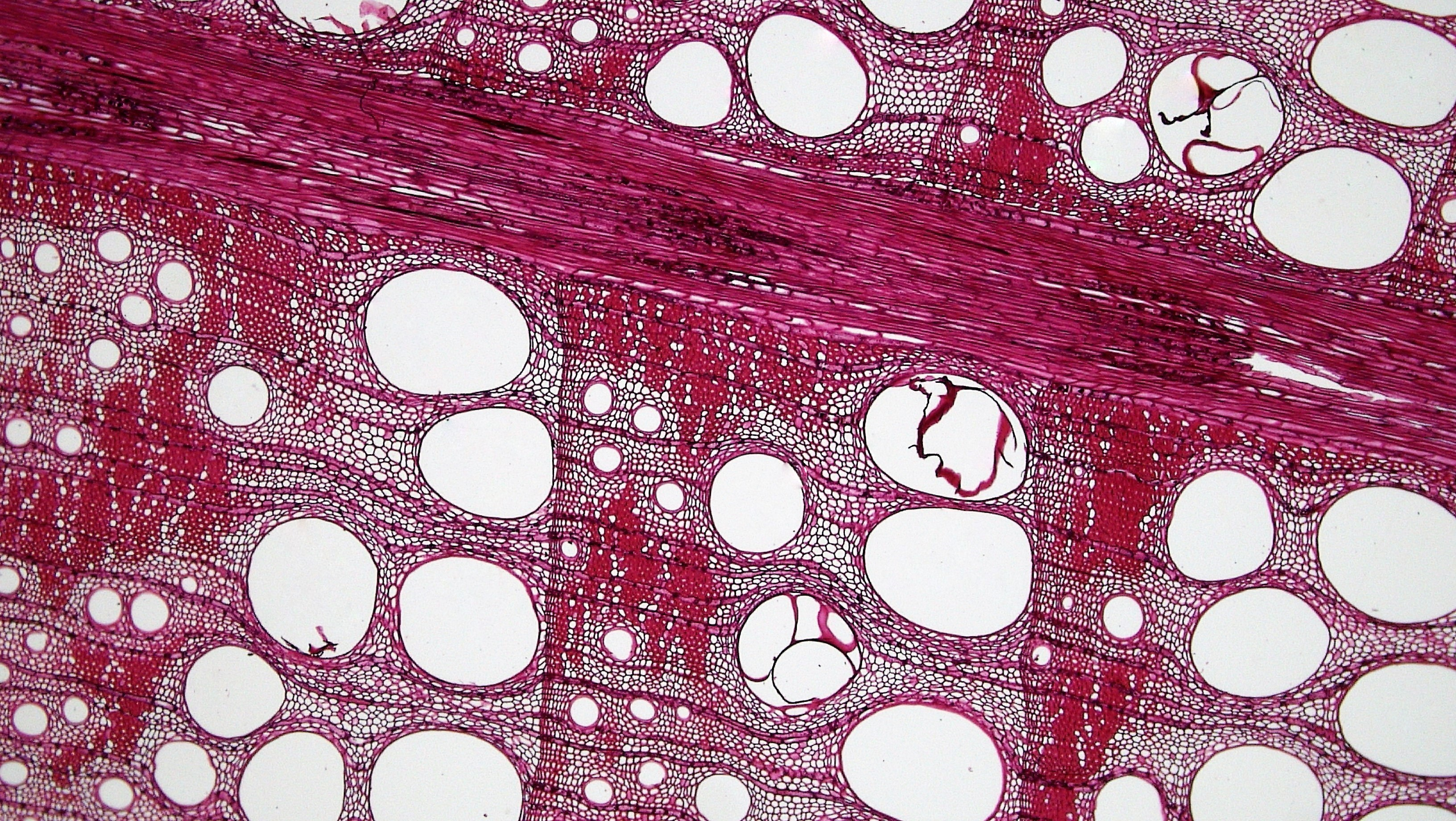
The anatomy of oak wood, full of vessels and two-sized rays

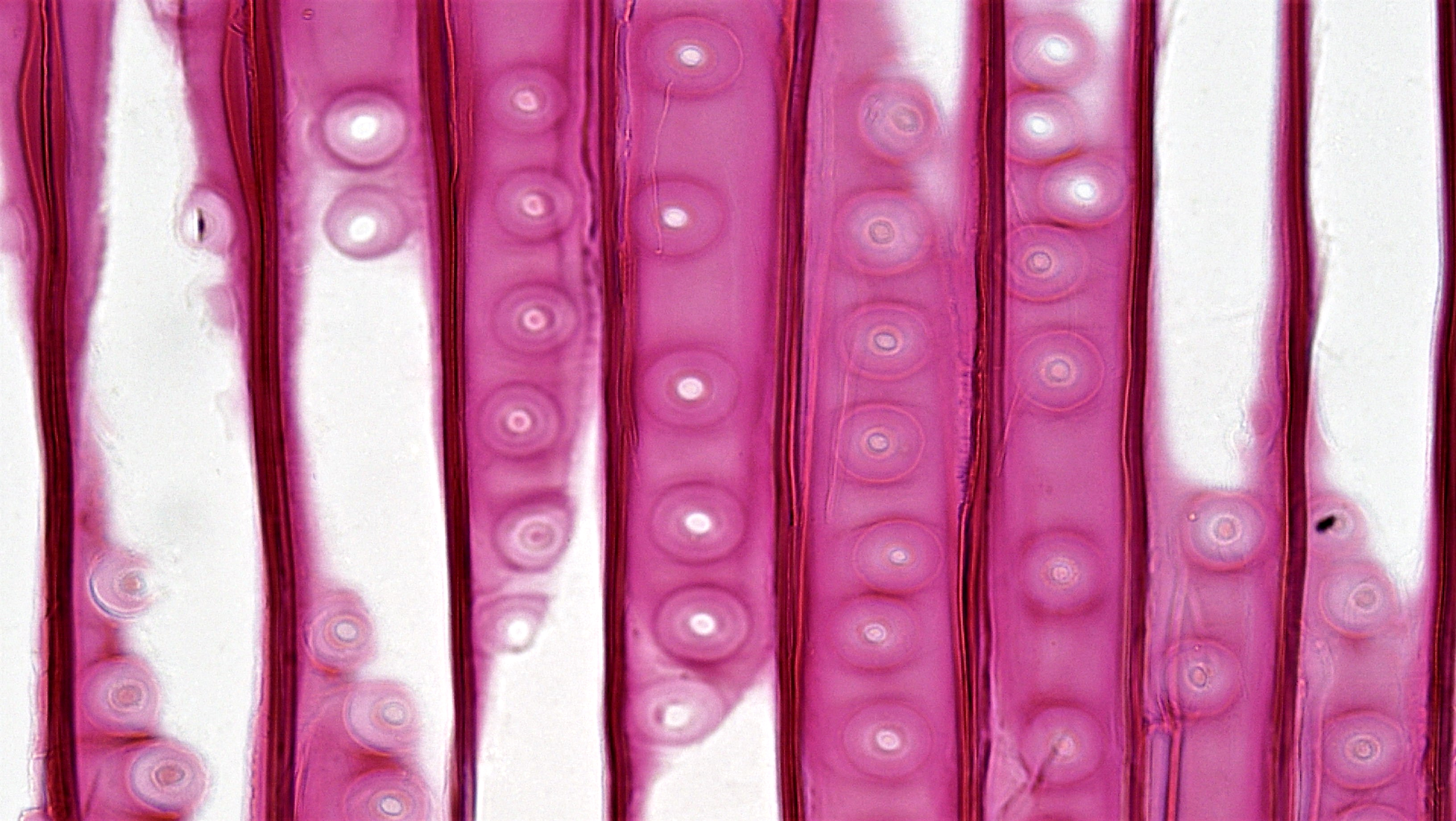
Typical bordered pits as in a coniferous wood species

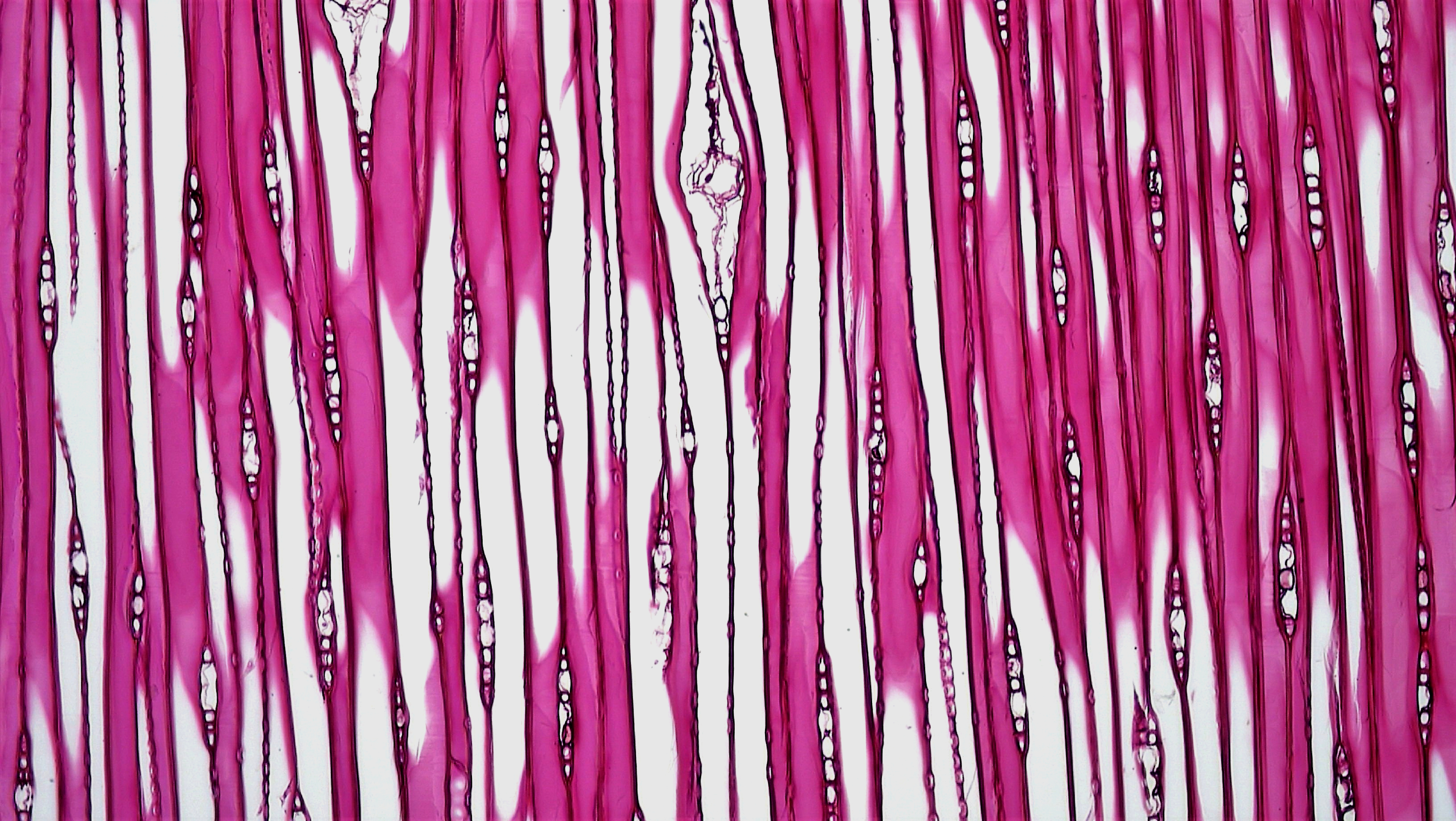
Radial section of wood in which rays are shown

Wood anatomy is a scientific sub-area of wood science, which examines the variations in xylem anatomical characteristics across trees, shrubs, and herbaceous species to explore inquiries related to plant function, growth, and the environment.

Extensive study of the wood structure helps also in macroscopically or microscopically identifying the exact wood species for a variety of scientific, technical, historical, economical and other reasons. In recent years, wood anatomy also helps developing new techniques in preventing the illegal logging of forests, that is the harvest, transportation, purchase, or sale of timber in violation of laws, leading to a number of environmental issues such as deforestation, soil erosion and biodiversity loss.

Commonly studied features include the dimensions of lumens and the thickness of walls in the conducting cells (tracheids, vessels), fibers, and various ray properties. The structural attributes of each xylem anatomical feature are largely predetermined upon formation and significantly influence its functionality, encompassing the transport and storage of water, nutrients, sugars, hormones, and mechanical support provision.

These anatomical features are localized within the growth rings, facilitating the establishment of intra-annual structure-function relationships and sensitivity to environmental fluctuations. However, generating large datasets of xylem anatomical data poses numerous methodological challenges.

== Main topics ==
The wood anatomy includes the study of the structure of the bark, cork, xylem, phloem, vascular cambium, heartwood and sapwood and branch collar.

The main topic is the anatomy of two distinct types of wood:

- Softwoods
- Hardwoods

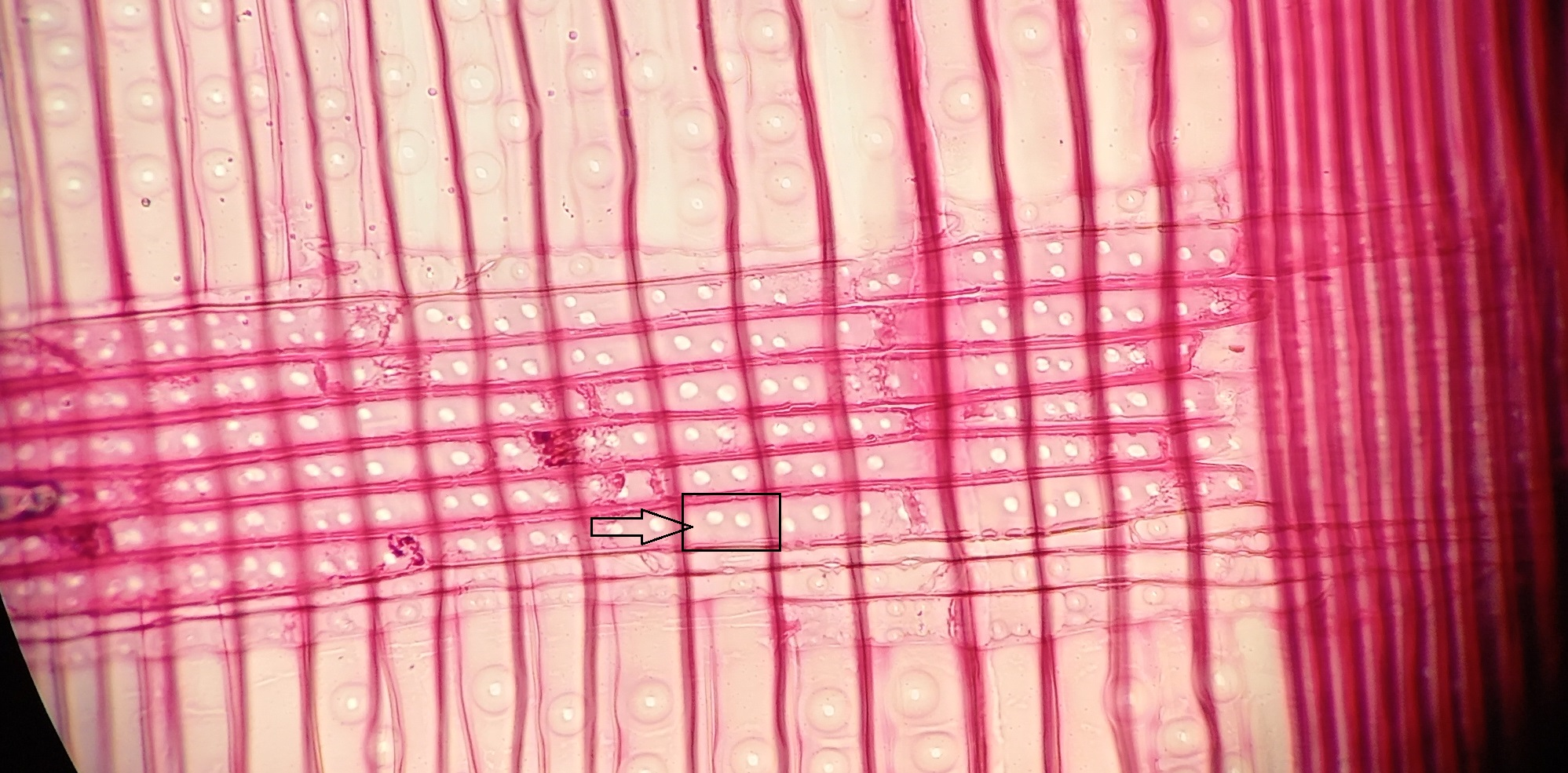
Optical microscope image showing a pinoid pit, characteristic microscopic feature of Calabrian pine (Pinus brutia) wood in the cross-field area

In botanical terminology, softwoods are sourced from gymnosperms, primarily conifers, whereas hardwoods originate from angiosperms, specifically flowering plants. Within the temperate zones of the northern hemisphere, softwoods are typically represented by needle-leaved evergreen trees such as pine (Pinus) and spruce (Picea), while hardwoods are predominantly composed of broadleaf, deciduous trees like maple (Acer), birch (Betula), and oak (Quercus).

The differentiation between softwoods and hardwoods extends beyond tree categorization to the cellular level. Softwoods exhibit a simpler basic wood structure, characterized by only two cell types and limited variation within these categories. In contrast, hardwoods display increased structural complexity owing to a higher number of fundamental cell types and a considerable degree of variability within these cell types. The primary distinguishing feature lies in the presence of vessel elements, also referred to as pores, which are characteristic of hardwoods and absent in softwoods.

Despite these disparities, softwoods and hardwoods share a cellular similarity – the majority of cells are non-living at maturity, even within the sapwood. These living cells at maturity, identified as parenchyma cells, are present in both softwoods and hardwoods.

Specific features (macroscopic, physical, microscopic) have been established by the IAWA for the identification of softwoods and hardwoods.

== Databases ==
There are several databases relating to wood anatomy. One of them, InsideWood, is an online resource and database for wood anatomy, serving as a reference, research, and teaching tool. This database was created by several international researchers, members of the IAWA, mostly botanists, biologists and wood scientists. The database thousands of wood anatomical descriptions and nearly 66,000 photomicrographs of contemporary woods, along with more than 1,600 descriptions and 2,000 images of fossil woods.

Another very important database for wood anatomy, is the so-called, Delta Intkey.

In 2024, a new novel electronic device, named as The XyloTron, was fully developed at the Forest Products Laboratory for fast and reliable identification of wood.

== Historical background ==
The inception of wood anatomy traces its roots back to the 17th century, during which pioneering scientists such as Robert Hooke, Marcello Malpighi, Nehemiah Grew, and Antoni van Leeuwenhoek emerged as the first individuals to utilize simple light microscopes. Hooke because he had high technical expertise, puts efforts to increase the quality of microscopes, focusing particularly on optimizing illumination and refining control over height and angle. Ultimately, he achieved magnifications of up to 50×, conducting examinations on a diverse array of objects. In 1665, Robert C. Hooke authored the seminal work "Micrographia," wherein he provided precise details concerning the porosity of charcoal and the structure of cork.

Antoni van Leeuwenhoek, the third luminary in the field of microscopical plant anatomy, first delineated the characteristics of numerous hardwoods and certain softwoods. Through the utilization of his personally crafted and refined microscope lenses, van Leeuwenhoek demonstrated an exceptional ability to discern intricate details, including bordered pits, perforation rims in vessels, and a macrofibrillar substructure within the cell wall.

As early as the mid-19th century, there was a notable increase in attention directed towards the examination of the structure of woody cell walls. Von Mohl employing polarized light microscopy, was the first to articulate the lamellar composition of a wood cell wall. However, his initial description only differentiated between primary and secondary lamellae, with the recognition of the tertiary lamella occurring later, thanks to Theodor Hartig. Von Mohl also accurately depicted most structural aspects of bordered pits in conifers.Taking a chemical perspective on the woody cell wall, Payen introduced the term "cellulose" to describe one of its constituents, emphasizing its similarity to starch. Carl Nägeli subsequently identified the cell wall as comprising crystalline cellulose, while Mulder introduced the term "lignin" to describe another constituent distinct from cellulose.

The 20th century witnessed significant advancements in technology, influencing the wood anatomy area, and thus enabling a more detailed analysis of microstructural, chemical, and physiological characteristics. Irving W. Bailey using the application of conventional light microscopy and indirect methods such as polarization microscopy, X-ray diffraction, and staining techniques delved into the fine structure of wood tissues. Collaborating with his coworkers, Bailey established the uninucleate condition of fusiform cambial initials. He unveiled intricate details concerning the fine structure of the wood cell wall, particularly highlighting the non-cellulosic nature of the middle lamella. Contributions to the understanding of the fine structure of the wood cell wall were also made by Albert Frey-Wyssling and Reginald Dawson Preston, who employed light microscopy-based techniques. In parallel, Johannes Liese integrated his expertise in wood anatomy and decay mechanisms with extensive studies on wood protection.

The advent of the electron microscope in wood biology around 1950 marked a transformative moment, ushering in a new dimension for the study of structural wood anatomy. Walter Liese, in 1950, captured the inaugural electron micrograph of a pine bordered pit membrane at the Institute of Ernst and Helmut Ruska in Berlin. In 1986, Ernst Ruska was awarded the Nobel Prize in Physics for his foundational contributions to electron optics and the design of the first electron microscope. This first image distinctly reveals the central torus and peripheral margo fibrils of wood with remarkable clarity.

In the 21st century, wood anatomy is strongly being connected and inter-related with molecular biology. A significant milestone in molecular biology transpired between 2000 and 2020 with the accomplishment of sequencing entire genomes of trees. The comprehensive DNA sequences of forest trees marked their debut in 2006 with the publication of the Populus trichocarpa genome, followed by Eucalyptus grandis in 2014. Picea abies, as the inaugural conifer species, underwent sequencing in 2013. Subsequently, numerous other tree genomes have been successfully sequenced.
