= George Mantanis =

Greek academician, university professor and wood scientist

George Mantanis Γεώργιος Μαντάνης
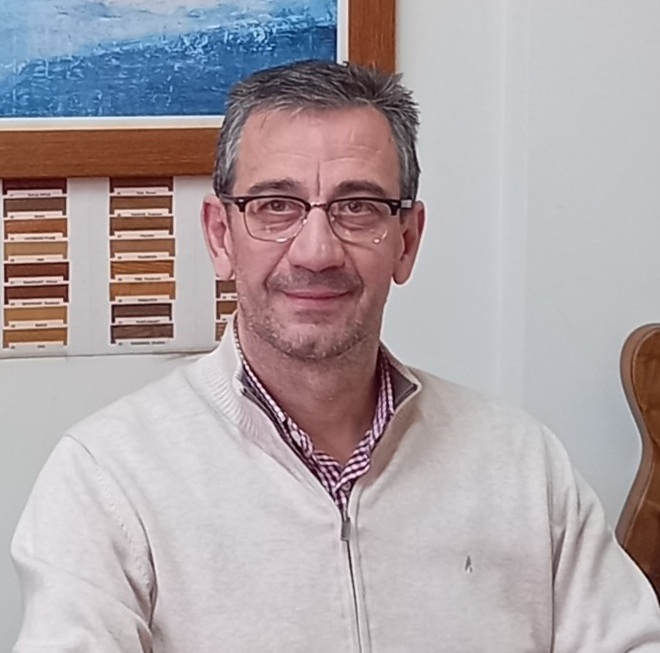
- Born: September 18, 1966 (age 60); Lesbos, Greece
- Education: Aristotle University of Thessaloniki; University of Wisconsin-Madison
- Occupations: Researcher; educator; journal co-editor; wood scientist
- Years active: Since 1991
- Known for: Studies on wood swelling
- Awards: Fellow of the International Academy of Wood Science; Fellow of the Hellenic Agricultural Academy
- Scientific career
- Workplaces: University of Wisconsin-Madison; Forest Research Institute of Thessaloniki; Chimar Hellas S.A.; TEI of Thessaly; University of Thessaly
- Thesis: Swelling of lignocellulosic materials in water and organic liquids (1994)
- Doctoral advisor: Raymond A. Young

George Mantanis (Greek: Γεώργιος Μαντάνης; born September 18, 1966) is a Greek academician, wood scientist and professor at the University of Thessaly in Greece.

He is an elected fellow (FIAWS) of the International Academy of Wood Science and fellow of the Hellenic Agricultural Academy, and also, co-editor of the scientific journal, Wood Material Science and Engineering.

== Early life and education ==
Mantanis was born in Mytilene, Greece, in 1966, and grew up in the village, Stipsi. He is the eldest son of Eleni Sevastou and her husband, Ignatios Mantanis. He completed his secondary education with honors at the High School of Kalloni at Lesbos island, in 1984. Subsequently, from 1984 to 1989, he pursued undergraduate studies in forestry specializing in wood technology, earning a university diploma from the Aristotle University of Thessaloniki, Department of Forestry and Natural Environment.

After receiving a McIntire–Stennis scholarship, he pursued doctoral studies in the United States of America under the supervision of Raymond A. Young at the University of Wisconsin-Madison in Madison. He got his PhD degree in 1994, after conducting novel research upon the swelling of wood and lignocellulosic materials in water and organic liquids, resulting in five papers which have received -until August 2025- more than 1,000 citations at Google Scholar.

== Research career ==
In the years 1996–1997, he worked at the Forest Research Institute of Thessaloniki, located in Thermi, Greece. During the years 1998–2001, he was employed at the chemical research company Chimar Hellas S.A. in Thessaloniki. After that, he worked as a faculty member at the Technological Educational Institute of Thessaly, Department of Wood & Furniture Design and Technology, from 2002 to 2019. Since February 2019, he has held the position of full professor at University of Thessaly and serves as the head of Laboratory of Wood Science and Technology, Department of Forestry, Wood Sciences & Design, which is located in Karditsa.

In 2018, Mantanis was selected as a co-editor in the scientific journal, Wood Material Science and Engineering (Taylor & Francis), which publishes topics related to wood science, technology and engineering. In addition, he is a reviewer in the wood-related journals, Holzforschung, European Journal of Wood and Wood Products, Wood Material Science and Engineering, Wood Science and Technology and BioResources. Since 2025, he is a member at the editorial board of the Indian scientific journal, Journal of the Indian Academy of Wood Science.

In October 2020, the journal PLOS Biology included Mantanis in Mendeley Data 2020 acknowledging his work in the scientific area of wood science. In December 2021, the International Academy of Wood Science elected Mantanis as a fellow for his research and scientific work. In October 2023, he was ranked at the top 2% of scientists in the world in the area of wood science ("forestry – materials"), and also, in 2024, 2025 and 2026 (Elsevier Data).

Until October 2026, the research work of Mantanis has received more than 3,980 citations at Google Scholar (h-index: 30). Also, in 2026, Mantanis was elected a Fellow of the Hellenic Agricultural Academy in recognition of his academic work.

== Personal life ==
Since 2002, Mantanis has resided in Karditsa, Greece. He has been married to Paraskevi Zougrou since 1992, and they have two adult sons, Ignatios and Antonios.

== Selected publications ==
- Sandberg, D., Kutnar, A., Mantanis, G. (2017). Wood modification technologies-a review (423 cit.)
- Mantanis, G. et al. (2018). Adhesive systems used in the European particleboard, MDF and OSB industries (247 cit.)
- Mantanis, G. et al. (1994). Swelling of wood: Part 1. Swelling in water (243 cit.)
- Mantanis, G. et al. (1995). Swelling of compressed cellulose fiber webs in organic liquids (228 cit.)
- Mantanis, G. (2017). Chemical modification of wood by acetylation or furfurylation: A review of the present scaled-up technologies (201 cit.)
- Mantanis, G. et al. (1994). Swelling of wood. Part II. Swelling in organic liquids (190 cit.)
- Mantanis, G. and Young, R. (1997). Wetting of wood (174 cit.)
- Mantanis, G. et al. (2014). Evaluation of mold, decay and termite resistance of pine wood treated with zinc-and copper-based nanocompounds (140 cit.)
