= Krishna K. Pandey =

Indian senior researcher and wood scientist

- Born: 7 May 1962 (age 64); India
- Known for: Wood protection
- Awards: Fellow of International Academy of Wood Science; National Award for Excellence in Forestry Research (ICFRE)
- Scientific career
- Fields: Wood science, wood polymers, surface chemistry
- Workplaces: Institute of Wood Science and Technology

Krishna K. Pandey (India; born 7 May 1962) is an Indian wood scientist and senior researcher at the Institute of Wood Science and Technology (IWST) in Bengaluru, who is an elected fellow (FIAWS) and distinguished member of the International Academy of Wood Science. Since 2014, he serves as editor-in-chief of the Journal of the Indian Academy of Wood Science.

== Research career ==
Pandey holds an MSc and PhD degrees in wood sciences, specializing in the development of durable wood coatings using nanotechnology and UV stabilizers. He has made research contributions upon the wood polymer characterization, surface chemistry and weathering of wood, while his research work has received -until June 2025- over 5,800 international citations at the database of Scopus, having an h-index of 31.

Through his career, Pandey has been elected as a fellow at the International Academy of Wood Science, and also he was the recipient of the National Award for Excellence in Forestry Research (by ICFRE) as well as an elected member at the Environmental Effects Assessment Panel of UNEP.

In October 2023, a meta-research carried out by John Ioannidis et al. at Stanford University included Krishna K. Pandey in Elsevier Data 2022, where he was ranked in the top 2% of researchers in wood science (forestry – polymers) globally, having a c-score of 3.6588, one of the highest five in this scientific area. In August 2024, Pandey has acquired the same 2% high ranking in the wood sciences (Elsevier Data 2023), and also in 2025.

== Selected publications ==
- Pandey, K. K. (21 March 1999). "A study of chemical structure of soft and hardwood and wood polymers by FTIR spectroscopy". Journal of Applied Polymer Science. 71 (12): 1969–1975. doi:10.1002/(SICI)1097-4628(19990321)71:12<1969::AID-APP6>3.0.CO;2-D. (1,586 citations)
- Pandey, K.K; Pitman, A.J (October 2003). "FTIR studies of the changes in wood chemistry following decay by brown-rot and white-rot fungi". International Biodeterioration & Biodegradation. 52 (3): 151–160. Bibcode:2003IBiBi..52..151P. doi:10.1016/S0964-8305(03)00052-0. (1,504 citations)
