= Edmone Roffael =

Palestinian-German professor, chemist and wood scientist

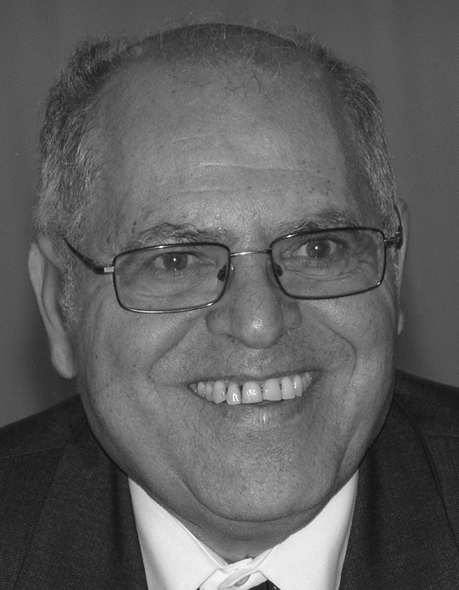
- Born: December 31, 1939; Tulkarm, Mandatory Palestine
- Died: 2021 (aged 81–82); Braunschweig, Lower Saxony, Germany
- Education: Institute for Macromolecular Chemistry at Darmstadt
- Occupations: Researcher; educator; organic chemist; wood scientist
- Years active: 1970–2019

Edmone Roffael (1939–2021) was a Palestinian-German chemist and wood scientist, and former professor at the Georg-August University of Göttingen, who made noteworthy contributions to clarifying the release of formaldehyde from particleboard and MDF products, and its emission reduction.

Roffael was an honorary fellow of the International Academy of Wood Science.

From 1993 to 2005, Roffael served as the head of the Department of Wood Chemistry and Wood Technology at the Institute of Wood Biology and Wood Technology, Faculty of Forest Sciences and Forest Ecology at the Georg-August University of Göttingen. His yearlong research work has held a worldwide recognition.

== Biography ==
Edmone Roffael was born on December 31, 1939, in Tulkarm, Palestine. Initially, he studied chemistry in Egypt at University of Alexandria and Cairo University, as well as at the Technical University of Darmstadt in Germany.

After completing his studies, he obtained a Ph.D. in cellulose chemistry from TU Darmstadt in 1968, with a dissertation titled "X-ray and infrared investigations on the orderliness of cellulose." Subsequently, he worked from 1970 to 1993 at the Fraunhofer Institute for Wood Research in Braunschweig, where he was engaged in technological wood research, cooperating also with the-then director, Dr. Rainer Marutzky. His work focus soon became various particleboard materials and their production using synthetic resins, mostly formaldehyde-based resins (UF, MUF, PF). Regarding this topic, Roffael authored his habilitation thesis, titled "Possibilities of gluing wood particles with phenol-formaldehyde resins and sulfite liquor," which resulted in his habilitation at the Faculty of Forestry at the Georg-August University of Göttingen in 1976 and granted him the teaching qualification (venia legendi) for the subject of "Wood Chemistry."

Beginning in 1981, Roffael taught as an adjunct professor at the Faculty of Forestry at the University of Göttingen. In 1993, he accepted the appointment to the Chair of Wood Science at Goettingen University. In the following years, he established the Wood Chemistry Department at the Institute of Forest Utilization, and in 1997, the entire institution was renamed to as "Institute of Wood Biology and Wood Technology".

Roffael gained international recognition primarily through his contributions to formaldehyde research. He had focused his scientific attention on this issue publishing the seminal work "Die Formaldehyd-Abgabe von Spanplatten und anderen Werkstoffen" in 1982. However, it was only in the years following that the topic garnered widespread public attention, especially due to serious concerns about the potential health risks and the hazards for the public health. That work was updated and translated into Russian (1991) and English (1993). The methods and devices for measuring the then-found carcinogenic formaldehyde emissions from materials, which Roffael co-developed, were the basis for the development of the German (DIN) and European (EN) standards, guidelines, and regulations. Roffael continuously sought ways to minimize the off-gassing of these substances. He also conducted research on other so-called volatile organic compounds (VOCs) emitted from raw wood and glued wood products. Roffael was also heavily involved in the development of tannin-bonded particleboard panels.

He held numerous patents. In addition, more than 20 doctoral theses and more than 40 D.Sc. and M.Sc. theses were performed under his scientific guidance. Roffael was very active in numerous committees and associations, served for the former German Society for Wood Research (DGfH e.V.) in several expert committees. In addition, he was regular member of the Euro Wood Network, the United Nations Environment Programme Working Group, the Zellcheming Association and the Cellulose-Chemists-Club Darmstadt. He also participated as a member in the editorial boards of the estemmed wood-related journals, Holzforschung and European Journal of Wood and Wood Products.

Even after his retirement in 2005, he continued to be active in scientific research at Goettingen University, coordinating various research projects. In 2017, he published the book "Formaldehyde in Nature, Wood and Wood Materials", both in German and English.

Edmone Roffael died in Braunschweig in January 2021.

== Recognition ==
During his career, Roffael published his research findings primarily in journals such as WKI-Mitteilungen, Holz als Roh- und Werkstoff, Holz-Zentralblatt, and Das Papier. By 2019, he had authored over 900 scientific and technical publications of any kind.

His research work enjoyed a worldwide recognition. His various research and consulting activities took him to Egypt, Brazil, Bulgaria, Chile, Canada, Malaysia, Sweden, Syria, Turkey, and the USA. He has had fruitful research collaboration also in Greece, with the chemical resin company, Chimar Hellas.

In 1988, Roffael, along with his fellows Marutzky and Mehlhorn, were awarded by the International Association iVTH for their research work on the topic "Investigations on the formaldehyde emissions from wood-based materials and other materials, and the development of methods to reduce formaldehyde emission potential."

On the occasion of his 65th birthday, the Faculty of Forest Sciences and Forest Ecology at the University of Göttingen honored him on April 21, 2005, with a symposium on "Wood Industry and Wood Products in Transition." Approximately 120 participants from academia and industry gathered in the auditorium at Wilhelmsplatz to celebrate.

In October 2023, a meta-research carried out by John Ioannidis et al. at Stanford University, included Edmone Roffael in Elsevier Data 2022, where he was ranked at the top 2% of researchers in wood science (forestry – materials), having a composite index of 3.0892.

== Selected works ==
- "Röntgen- und Infrarotuntersuchungen über den Ordnungszustand der Cellulose" (X-ray and Infrared Studies on the Orderliness of Cellulose), dissertation, Darmstadt 1968
- "Möglichkeiten der Verleimung von Holzspänen mit Phenolformaldehydharzen und Sulfitablauge" (Possibilities of Gluing Wood Particles with Phenol-Formaldehyde Resins and Sulfite Liquor), habilitation thesis, Göttingen 1975/1976
- "Beiträge zur Verwendung von alkalischen Phenolformaldehyharzen [Phenolformaldehydharzen] und Ligninsulfonaten bei der Verleimung von Holzspänen" (Contributions to the Use of Alkaline Phenol-Formaldehyde Resins and Lignosulfonates in Gluing Wood Particles), WKI-Bericht No. 8, Braunschweig 1976
- "Die Formaldehyd-Abgabe von Spanplatten und anderen Werkstoffen" (Formaldehyde Emissions from Particleboard and Other Materials), Stuttgart 1982 (ISBN 3-87181-301-X; Russian translation 1991, English translation 1993)
- Edited with Rainer Grießhammer: "Verwendung von Durchforstungsholz und Altpapier zur Papierherstellung unter Berücksichtigung forstwirtschaftlicher Belange" (Use of Thinned Wood and Waste Paper in Papermaking, Considering Forestry Aspects), Luft, Boden, Abfall (Issue 37), Stuttgart 1995
- "Umweltschutz in der Holzwerkstoffindustrie. Fachtagung am 24. und 25. Juni 1998 in Göttingen. Tagungsband" (Environmental Protection in the Wood-Based Materials Industry. Conference Proceedings, June 24–25, 1998, Göttingen), Göttingen 1999
- Together with Claus Behn: "Untersuchungen zur Verminderung der Längenänderung von Holzspanplatten durch gezielte Nutzung von materialimmanenten Eigenschaften und Verwendung von feuchtebeständigen Zusatzstoffen. Schlussbericht. Laufzeit: 01.07.1999 bis 31.08.2003" (Investigations into Reducing the Length Changes of Particleboard by Utilizing Intrinsic Properties and Using Moisture-Resistant Additives. Final Report. Project Duration: 01.07.1999 to 31.08.2003), Göttingen 2004

== Bibliography ==
- "Professor Dr.-Ing. Edmone Roffael" (2021). European Journal of Wood and Wood Products, 79 (3): 509–510; doi=10.1007/s00107-021-01693-3
- N.N.: "Prof. Dr.-Ing. Edmone Roffael, 65 Jahre" (Prof. Dr.-Ing. Edmone Roffael, 65 Years). In: "Holz-Zentralblatt", 131st Year, Issue 9/2005, p. 124, ISSN 0018-3792
- J. Fischer: "„Sie haben zu unser aller Lebensqualität beigetragen“. Festkolloquium anlässlich des 65. Geburtstages von Prof. Edmonde [sic!] Roffael – große Verdienste bei der Formaldehyd-Forschung" (""You Have Contributed to All Our Quality of Life." Symposium on the Occasion of Prof. Edmone Roffael's 65th Birthday – Great Achievements in Formaldehyde Research"). In: "Holz-Zentralblatt", 131st Year, Issue 35/2005, pp. 435 and 438, ISSN 0018-3792
