= Philip Evans =

Philip, Phillip or Phil Evans may refer to:

- Philip Evans and John Lloyd (1645–1679), Welsh Roman Catholic priest and saint
- Phil Evans (soccer, born 1980), South African football (soccer) player
- Phil Evans (Australian footballer) (born 1950), Australian rules footballer
- Phil Evans (darts player), Welsh darts player
- Philip Evans (headmaster) (born 1948), British educationalist and headmaster
- Philip Evans (cricketer) (born 1982), English cricketer
- Phillip Evans (baseball) (born 1992), American baseball player
- Phil Evans (basketball), Australian wheelchair basketball player
- Philip D. Evans, British-Canadian wood scientist and IAWS fellow
