= Carsten Mai =

German university professor and wood scientist (born 1966)

- Born: 1966 (age 59–60); Germany
- Education: University of Göttingen
- Occupation: Wood scientist
- Years active: Since 1998
- Known for: Research on chemical modification of wood and wood-based panels

Carsten Mai (born 1966) is a German wood scientist and professor at the University of Göttingen, where he is a faculty member and the current head of the Department of Wood Biology and Wood Products.

He is an elected Fellow (FIAWS) of the International Academy of Wood Science.

== Career ==
He studied in the Department of Chemistry at the University of Göttingen from 1987 to 1994, and also finished his doctoral thesis at the same university in 1998.

He later became assistant professor at the Department of Wood Biology and Wood Products in Goettingen. His research is mainly focused on the chemical modification of solid wood and wood-based materials, in the development of novel binder systems, and the recycling of wood-based materials.

One of the recent works of Mai et al. discussed the historical development of wood research in the 19th and 20th century in Europe and worldwide.
