= Peter Niemz =

German-born Swiss professor and wood scientist (born 1950)

- Born: February 5, 1950 (age 76); Crosta, Germany
- Education: University of Dresden
- Occupations: Researcher; educator; materials engineer; wood scientist
- Years active: Since 1972

Peter Niemz (born 1950) is a German-born Swiss materials engineer, retired wood scientist and emeritus professor of the Institute of Building Materials at ETH Zurich, who is an elected fellow (FIAWS) of the International Academy of Wood Science. His yearlong research work has held a worldwide recognition.

== Biography ==
Niemz was born and grew up in the small town of Crosta (Großdubrau), then part of the East Germany.

In 1968–1972, he studied at the Technical University of Dresden, specializing in wood and fiber based materials. Afterwards, he was employed as a researcher at the Institute for Wood Science and Technology (Dresden), where he worked during the years 1972–1992. In 1993 Niemz was elected as a professor at the University of Valdivia (today, Austral University of Chile) in Chile at the Institute of Wood Science and Technology and worked there until 1996.

Following that, he moved to Switzerland, and in 1996 he acquired the position of full professor of wood physics at ETH Zurich. He was eventually retired in 2015. After that, he worked as a senior wood scientist at the Bern University of Applied Sciences in Biel.

His research focused on wood physics and wood material properties, and has received -until March 2024- more than 10,000 citations at Google Scholar. Additionally, he served on the editorial boards of esteemed wood-related journals, like Wood Material Science and Engineering and Holzforschung. He served also as a visiting professor at the University of Life Sciences in Warsaw and the Universität für Bodenkultur in Vienna.

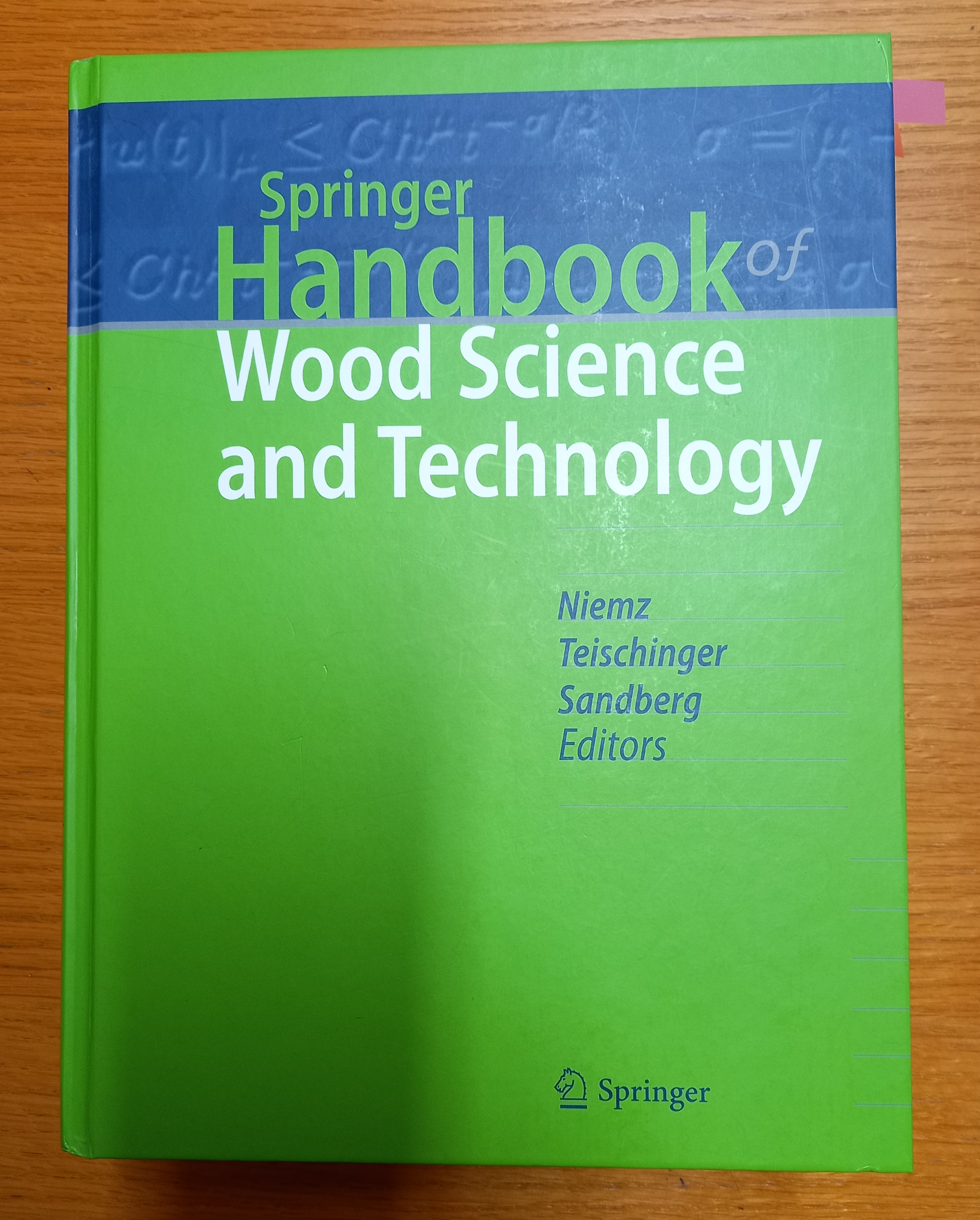
Springer Handbook of Wood Science and Technology

== Recognition ==
In 2002, Niemz was elected as a fellow at The International Academy of Wood Science for his yearlong research and academic work.

In October 2023, a meta-research carried out by John Ioannidis et al. at Stanford University included Niemz in Elsevier Data 2022, where he was ranked in the top 2% of researchers of all time in wood science (forestry – materials), having a c-index of 3.0672.

In December 2023, Niemz coordinated a Springer book edition, and along with Alfred Teischinger and Dick Sandberg edited the referenced Springer Handbook of Wood Science and Technology.
