= Dick Sandberg =

Swedish professor and wood scientist (born 1967)

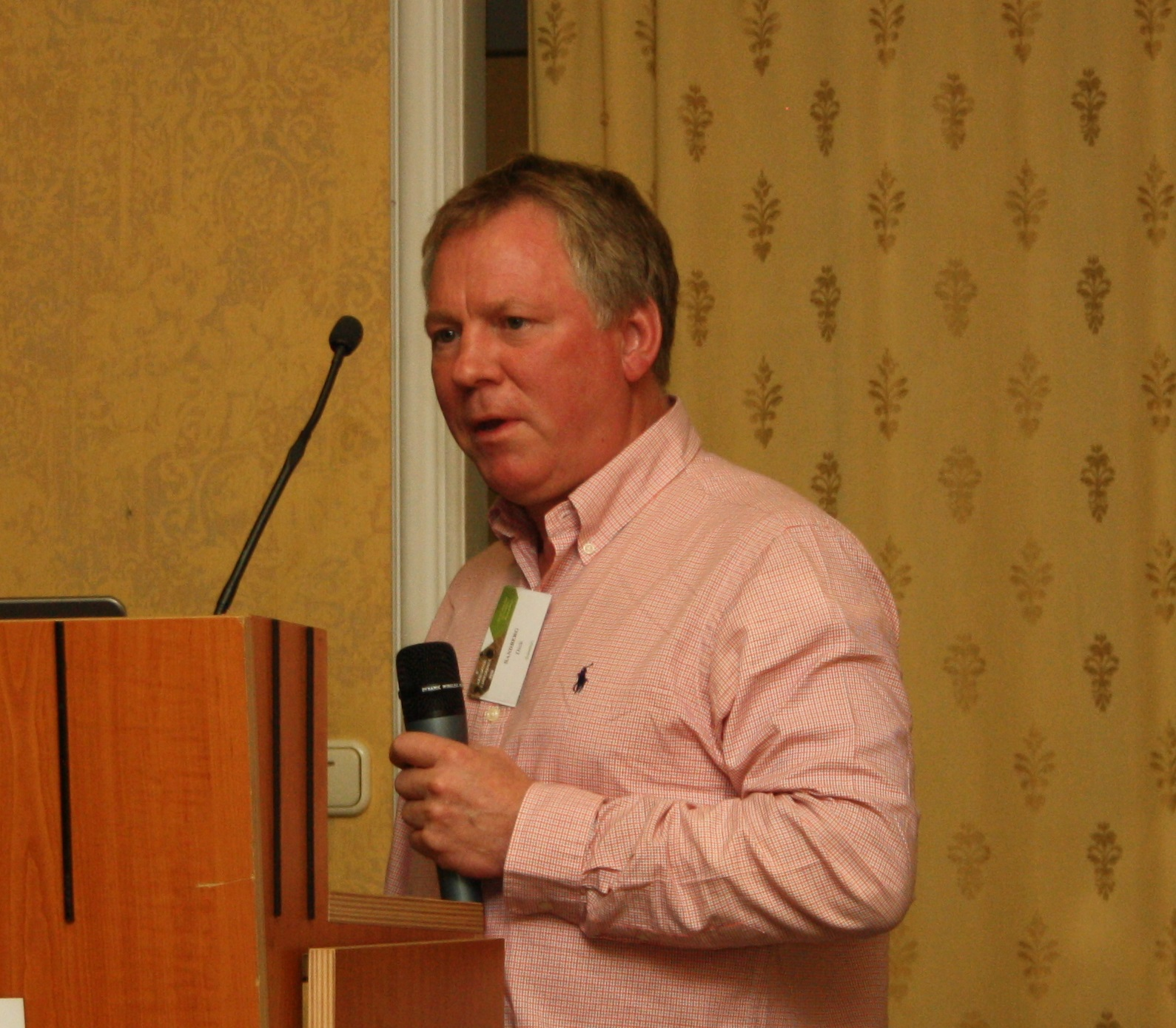
- Born: May 8, 1967 (age 59); Söderhamn
- Education: KTH Royal Institute of Technology
- Occupations: Researcher; educator; wood scientist
- Years active: Since 1996
- Awards: Fellow of the IAWS (2021); Editor of Wood Material Science and Engineering (2012)

Dick Sandberg (Söderhamn, Sweden, 8 May 1967) is a Swedish mechanical engineer and wood scientist at the Norwegian University of Science and Technology (NTNU), who is an elected fellow (FIAWS) of the International Academy of Wood Science.

He is currently the editor-in-chief at the journal Wood Material Science and Engineering, and the period 2013–2024, he has served as a chair professor at the Luleå University of Technology, Division of Wood Science and Engineering.

== Career ==
Sandberg was born in Söderhamn, Sweden. He obtained his PhD degree in mechanical engineering, with specialization in wood technology and processing from the KTH Royal Institute of Technology in Stockholm in 1998.

Afterwards, he worked as a wood specialist and manager in several wood enterprises in Sweden, and later served as a professor in forest products at Linnaeus University in Växjö. In 2015, he was elected as a chaired professor at Wood Science and Engineering division of Luleå University of Technology, in Skellefteå, where he worked until September 2024.

His main research interests include, among others, wood material properties, scanning technology and wood machining, as well as the production systems. Until March 2024, he has published more than 300 research works in several international journals and conferences.

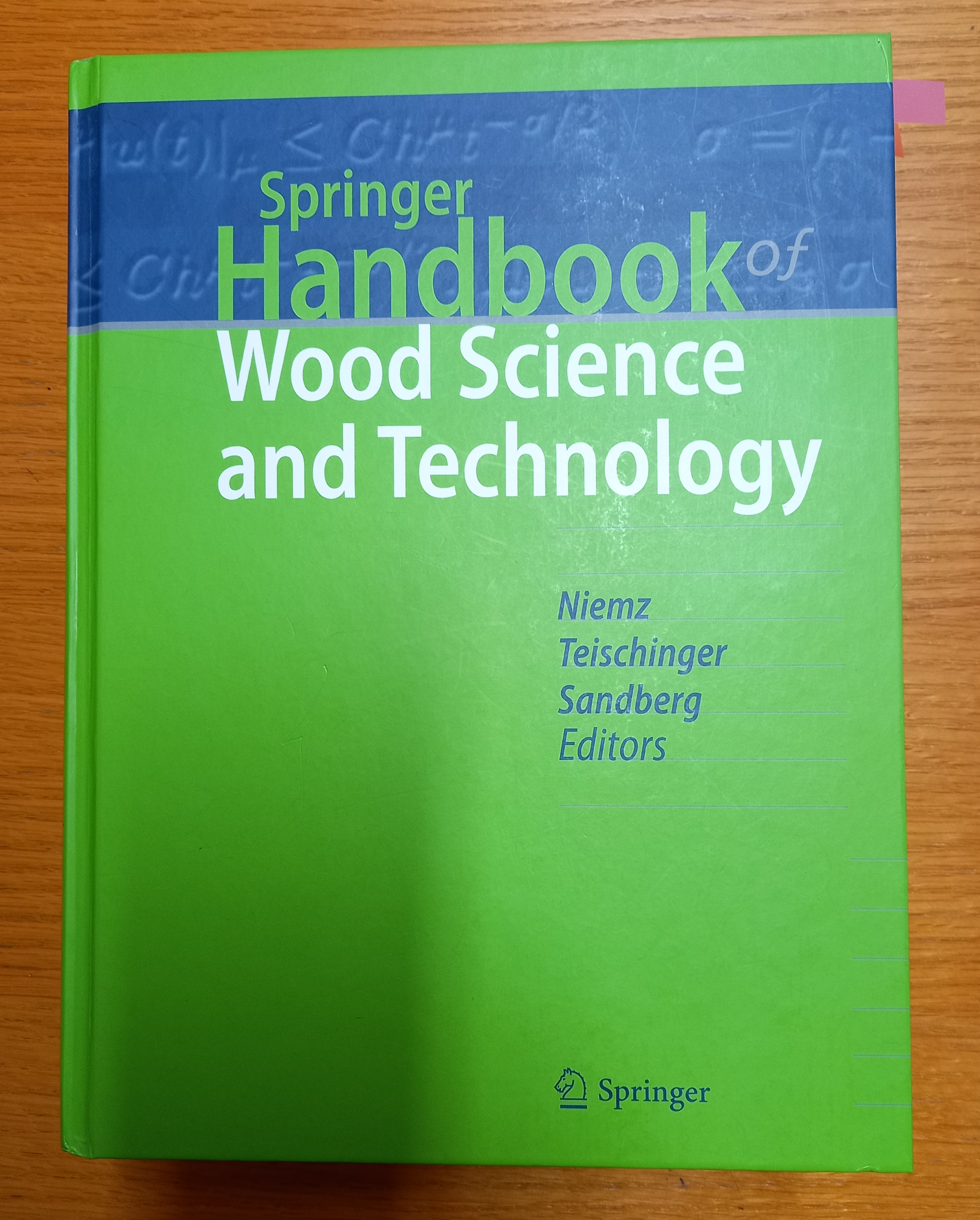
Springer Handbook of Wood Science and Technology

== Recognition ==
Since 2009, Sandberg has served as the editor-in-chief at the referred wood-related, scientific journal Wood Material Science and Engineering of the Taylor & Francis Group.

In 2021, in recognition of his research work, he was elected as a fellow at the International Academy of Wood Science. In October 2023, a meta-research carried out by John Ioannidis et al. at Stanford University included Dick Sandberg in Elsevier Data 2022, where he was ranked in the top 2% of researchers of all time in wood science (forestry – materials), having a c-index of 2.9702.

In 2023, along with wood scientists Alfred Teischinger and Peter Niemz, he edited the referenced edition of Springer Handbook of Wood Science and Technology.
