= Kuchl =

- Municipality
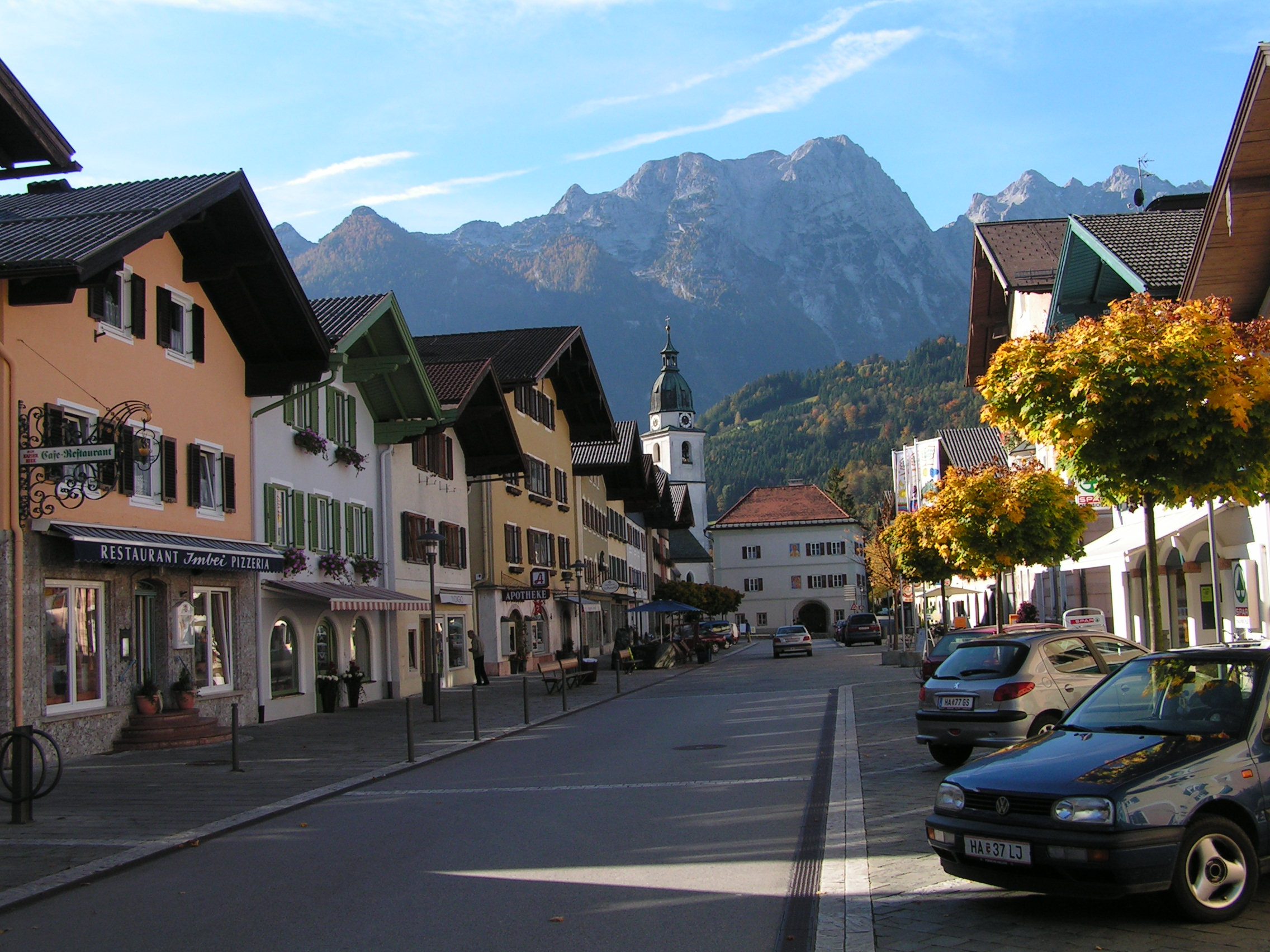
- Market square

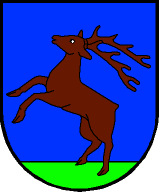
- Coat of arms

- Location within Austria
- Coordinates: 47°37′40″N 13°08′50″E
- Country: Austria
- State: Salzburg
- District: Hallein

Government
  - Mayor: Andreas Wimmer (ÖVP)

Area
  - Total: 46.9 km^{2} (18.1 sq mi)
- Elevation: 468 m (1,535 ft)

Population (2018-01-01)
  - Total: 7,274
  - Density: 155/km^{2} (402/sq mi)
- Time zone: UTC+1 (CET)
  - Summer (DST): UTC+2 (CEST)
- Postal code: 5431
- Area code: 06244
- Vehicle registration: HA
- Website: www.kuchl.net

Kuchl (German pronunciation: [ˈkʊxl̩]) is a market town in the Hallein district of Salzburg, Austria.

== Geography ==
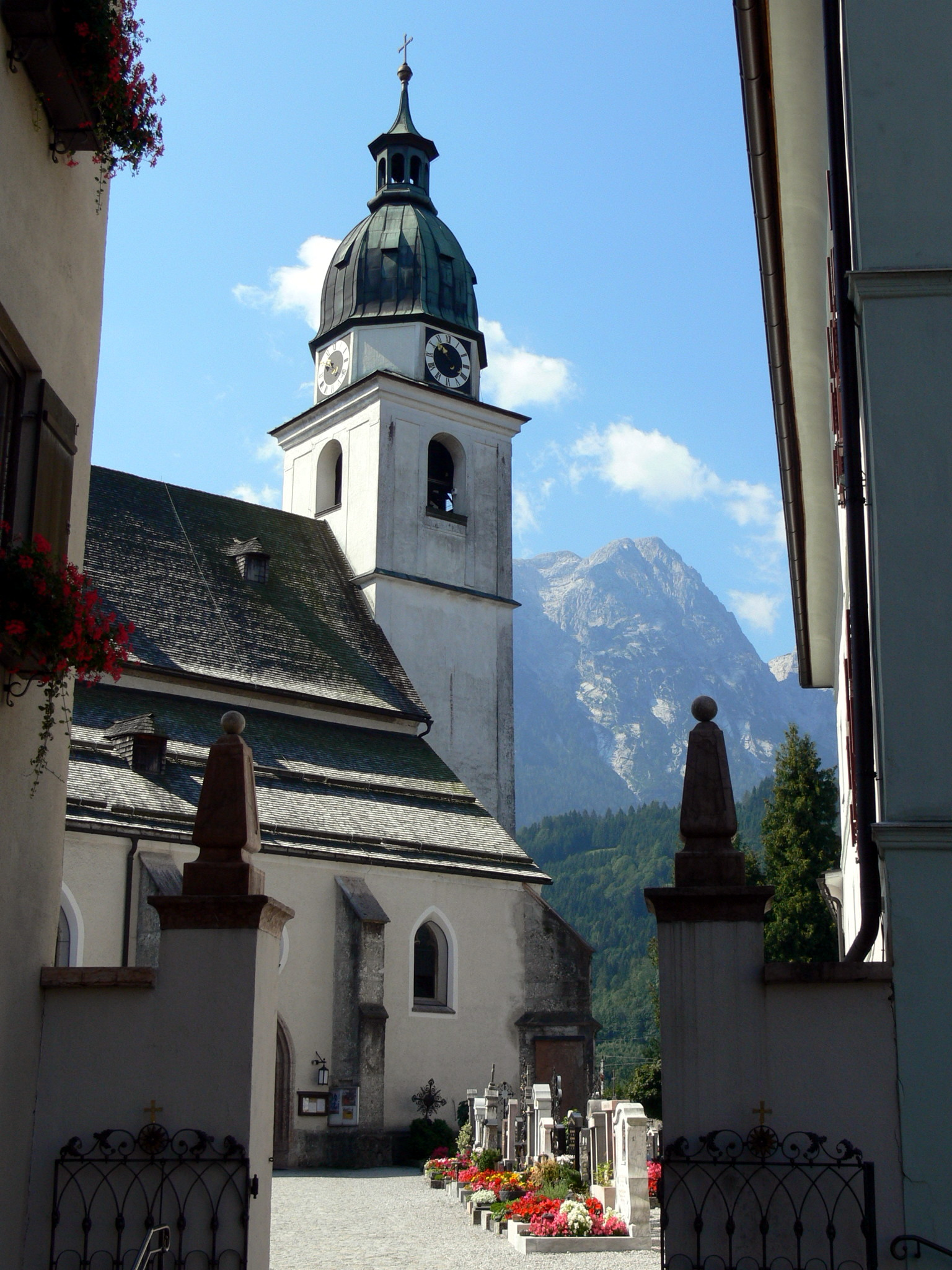
Parish church

Kuchl is situated in the broad valley of the Salzach river, part of the Salzburg Tennengau region. West of the river rises the Göll massif of the Berchtesgaden Alps range, forming the border with Germany. The municipal area comprises the cadastral communities Georgenberg, Jadorf, Kellau, Kuchl, and Weißenbach.

The picturesque landscape and the church tower were featured in the opening credits of the musical film The Sound of Music.

== History ==
The mansio of Cucullis in the Noricum province was already mentioned in the Tabula Peutingeriana, a Roman road map dating from the 4th century. According to the 511 Vita Sancti Severini biography by Eugippius, Saint Severinus of Noricum (d. 482) acted as a missionary here.

In 997 Archbishop Hartwig of Salzburg had a parish established at Kuchl. The settlement received market rights in 1380. After the German mediatisation and the Napoleonic Wars, the area finally fell to the Austrian Empire in 1816. The present-day municipality was established in 1850.

Since 1943 Kuchl is the seat of a technical college for wood economy (Holztechnikum) .

== Politics ==
Seats in the municipal assembly (Gemeinderat) as of 2009 elections:

- Austrian People's Party (ÖVP): 14
- Social Democratic Party of Austria (SPÖ): 5
- Independent list - Livable Kuchl (UL-LK): 3
- Free List & Alliance for the Future of Austria (FL BZÖ): 2
- Freedom Party of Austria (FPÖ): 1

== Twin town ==
- San Giovanni al Natisone, Italy

== Transportation ==
The Salzach valley is an important traffic route: Kuchl is a station on the Salzburg-Tyrol Railway line (Giselabahn), a continuation of the Austrian Western Railway, running from the city of Salzburg to Wörgl bypassing the Deutsches Eck. The parallel Tauern Autobahn (A10) leads from Salzburg to Villach with access at the Kuchl junction.

== Notable people ==
- Gerhard Struber, football manager
- Lisa Kaltenegger, astrophysicist and astrobiologist
- Nicolas Seiwald, footballer
- Rupert Wimmer, university professor, wood scientist and IAWS fellow
