= Ingo Burgert =

- Ingo Burgert
- Born: Germany
- Education: University of Hamburg
- Occupations: Researcher; educator; wood scientist
- Known for: Functional and bio-inspired wood materials
- Scientific career
- Fields: Wood science, Biomimetics, Wood materials
- Workplaces: ETH Zurich; Empa

Ingo Burgert (born 1968) is a German-Swiss wood scientist and professor at the ETH Zürich, Institute for Building Materials, who is a Fellow of the International Academy of Wood Science (IAWS). Since June 2026, he is the current President of the IAWS for the period 2026-2029.

== Career ==
Burgert studied wood science and technology at the University of Hamburg, earning a diploma in 1995 and a doctorate degree in wood biology in 2000.

He conducted postdoctoral research at BOKU Vienna (2000–2003), then led the Plant Biomechanics & Biomimetics group at the Max Planck Institute, Potsdam (2003–2011). In 2011, he became a full professor at ETH Zürich and co-leads the WoodTec group at Empa.

Burgert’s research addresses wood’s structure from nano- to macro- scale, enabling polymer and nanobased modifications to enhance durability, stability, and functionality. His group has developed electrically conductive "wood electronics" via laser induced graphitization, suitable for smart building sensors, and explores reversible wood–water actuation and piezoelectric composites.

In 2018, his novel work earned the Heinzel Mondi Sappi Award for "Delignified and Densified Cellulose Bulk Materials" by the ACS Applied Materials & Interfaces, and he received the 2020 SDG Award for his research work towards the sustainability.

In October 2023, a meta-research carried out by John Ioannidis et al. at Stanford University included Burgert in Elsevier Data 2022, where he was ranked at the top 2% of researchers in wood science globally ("forestry – nanoscience/nanotechnology"). In August 2024, Ingo Burgert has been also included for his research work in wood science at the Stanford/Elsevier top 2% list, having a high c-score of 3.6912. He also received the same distinction in 2025.

In January 2026, he and his fellow researcher Eleni Chatzi, received from ETH the Dandelion Entrepreneurship Awards for their applied research work.

Until August 2026, the research work of Burgert has received more than 20,000 citations at Google Scholar, having a high h-index of 77.
