= Rupert Wimmer =

Austrian professor and wood scientist (born 1960)

- Born: August 19, 1960 (age 66); Kuchl, Austria
- Education: University of Natural Resources and Life Sciences, Vienna
- Occupations: Researcher; educator; natural materials scientist; wood scientist
- Years active: Since 1987
- Awards: Fellow of the IAWS

Rupert Wimmer (Kuchl, 1960) is an Austrian academician, materials researcher, wood scientist and emeritus professor at the Institute of Wood Technology and Renewable Materials at BOKU University.

He is an elected fellow (FIAWS) of the International Academy of Wood Science and serves as the IAWS secretary and bulletin editor for the period 2023-2029. Since 2025, he works as a full professor at the Faculty of Forestry and Wood Technology in the Mendel University in Brno, Czech Republic.

== Research career ==
Wimmer studied wood science at the University of Natural Resources and Life Sciences in Vienna, where he completed all of his graduate studies. Additionally, he studied environmental protection at the Technical University of Vienna.

He has been employed as an adjunct professor at the Mendel University in Brno in Czech Republic (Department of Wood Science), full professor and head of the Wood Technology and Wood-based Composites Unit at University of Göttingen, R & D Manager at Funder Industries, and researcher in the Austrian research institute, Wood K plus in the period 2002-2012.

His research has focused on topics such as wood quality, wood biology, bio-based fibre materials and composites, as well as wood products industry, biomaterials and sustainability issues. Wimmer is the current IUFRO office holder in wood technology, and he is a member of the editorial board in the wood-related journal, Les/Wood. His research teams have won awards in the area of biomaterials and wood technology. Since 2021, through an initiative of the International Society of Wood Science and Technology, he has been organizing The Wood Science Talks.

In June 2023, Wimmer was elected as the secretary of the executive committee of the International Academy of Wood Science, an international academy and non-profit assembly of wood scientists, which represents worldwide all the fields of wood sciences. In October 2023, he was ranked among the top 2% of researchers of all time in wood science (forestry – polymers), having a c-index of 3.348. In August 2024, he also received the same ranking.

As of September 2026, his h-index is 55, with over 9,500 citations according to Google Scholar.
