= Antonio Pizzi =

Italian-born French-South African scientist (born 1946)

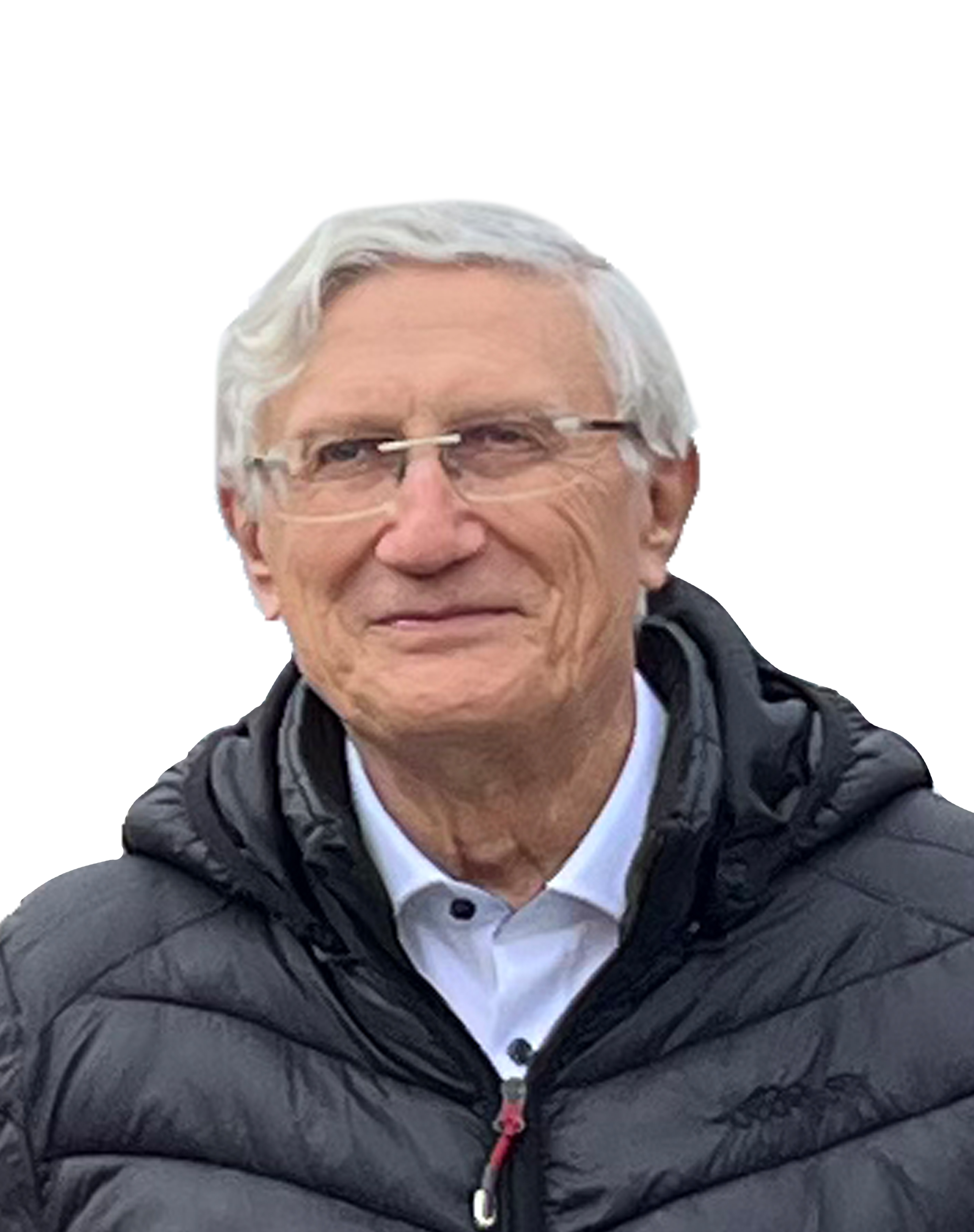
- Born: 15 May 1946 (age 80); Rome
- Education: University of Rome
- Occupations: Researcher; educator; polymer chemist; materials scientist
- Years active: Since 1967
- Known for: Studies on synthetic wood adhesives Environmentally-friendly bioadhesives Tannin-based adhesives
- Scientific career
- Workplaces: University of Lorraine; University of the Witwatersrand

Antonio Pizzi (Rome, 15 May 1946) is an Italian-born, French-South African polymer and materials chemist, and professor emeritus of industrial chemistry at the University of Lorraine, who is an expert in the field of wood adhesives and an elected fellow (FIAWS) and distinguished member of the International Academy of Wood Science.

== Career ==
Pizzi holds multiple degrees, including a doctorate in chemistry (D.Chem.) from the University of Rome (1970), as well as a PhD in organic chemistry and a DSc degree in wood chemistry, both from universities in South Africa. His early career combined academic roles with industry experience, which provided a foundation for his year-long research contributions in the field.

From the period 1989 to 1995, he served as a university professor of polymer chemistry at the University of the Witwatersrand in Johannesburg. He was the head of the Department of Chemistry in the years 1991-1993. He returned to Europe in 1994. He then joined the University of Lorraine in France, and initiated the Lab of Study and Research on Wood Materials (LERMAB-ENSTIB).

The research work of Pizzi focuses mostly on the polycondensation resins, including both green and synthetic wood adhesives. He is widely acknowledged for advancing the development and application of adhesives derived from renewable materials.

== Recognition ==
Throughout his career, Pizzi has published extensively, authoring more than 1,000 research articles, patents, and over 12 books, including foundational works on bioadhesives and bioresins. His research contributions have earned international scientific awards, reflecting his influence on the field of industrial and polymer chemistry. Pizzi's work is particularly related to the areas of renewable resources and environmentally friendly adhesive technologies. Until July 2025, his research work is well recognised in the fields of materials science and wood science and technology, having almost 30,000 citations at Scopus, and more than 51,800 citations at Google Scholar, with a very high h-index of 102.

In 2022, Pizzi received the prestigious Bill Wake Memorial Medal for his yearlong research work in adhesion and adhesives.

In October 2023, a meta-research conducted by John Ioannidis et al. at the Stanford University included Antonio Pizzi in Elsevier Data 2022, where he was ranked at the top 2% of researchers of all time in the area of materials, having a very high composite index of 4.0955.

In addition, Pizzi has won the prestigious Schweighofer Wood Innovation award in 2005, and also twice the Descartes Research Prize, awarded by the European Commission.

== Books ==
- Handbook of Adhesive Technology (2017), CRC Press (1,605 cit.)
- Lignocellulosic Fibers and Wood Handbook (2016), Wiley
- Wood Adhesives (2010), CRC Press
- Advanced Wood Adhesives Technology (1994), CRC Press (1,023 cit.)
