= Stypsi =

Stypsi Στύψη
- Municipal unit
- Location within Greece
- Coordinates: 39°18′N 26°13′E
- Country: Greece
- Administrative region: North Aegean
- Regional unit: Lesbos
- Municipality: West Lesbos
- Elevation: 400 m (1,300 ft)

Population (2021)
  - Community: 675
- Time zone: UTC+2 (EET)
  - Summer (DST): UTC+3 (EEST)
- Postal code: EL-81109
- Area code: (+30) 22530
- Vehicle registration: MY

Stypsi or Stipsi, is a village of the municipality of West Lesbos in Greece, which belongs to the Lesbos Prefecture and has a population of 675 permanent residents (as of 2021).

== Name ==
The name of the village originates from the Greek word, stypsi (στύψη, or στυπτηρία), the original chemical name of the mineral, potassium alum, the known, double sulfate of potassium and aluminium, which has the chemical formula, KAl(SO_{4})_{2.}•12H_{2}O.

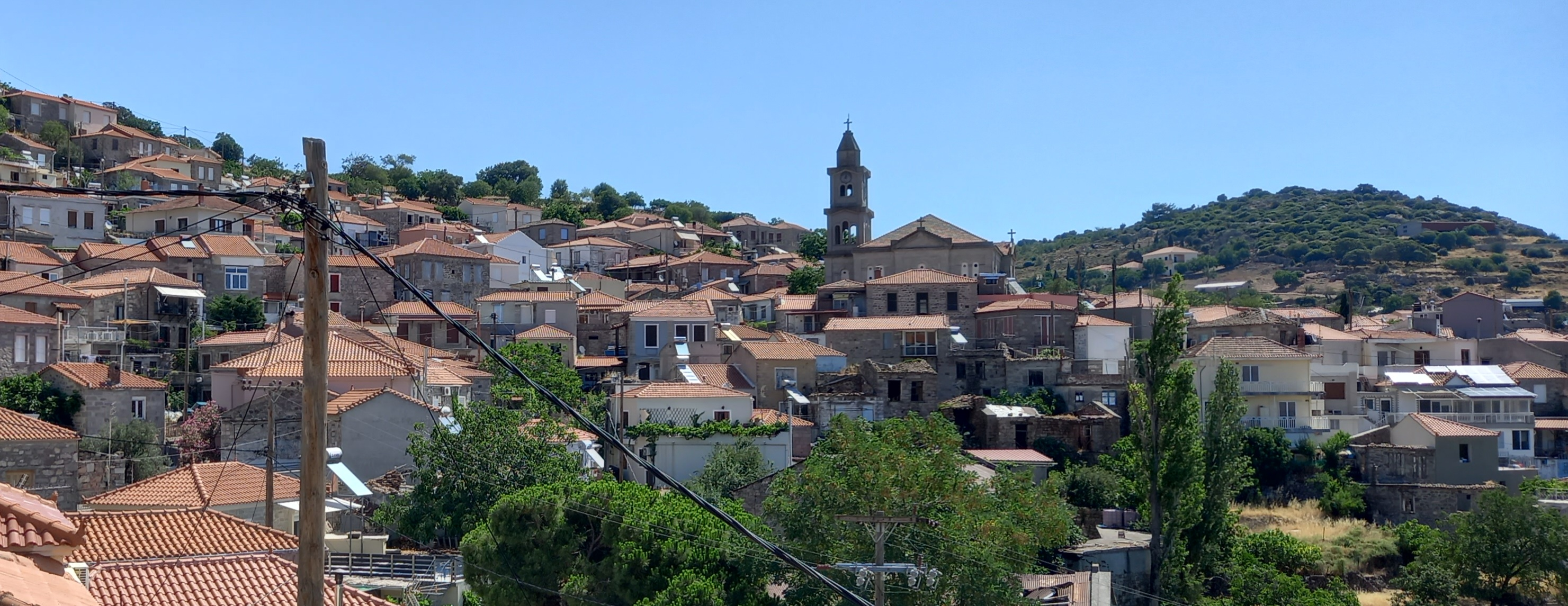
Partial view of Stipsi at Lesbos island

Stypsi or stipsi, was found abundant in the soils of the surrounding areas of Stipsi. Especially during the Roman period, in which potassium alum was produced in large quantities for the Roman Empire. This mineral was known to be utilised for the tanning of leathers and also used in paints. Mining of potassium alum was taken place until the 1970s.

== Description ==
Stypsi is a village situated at 400 m elevation, in the north part of Lesbos island, in the mountain of Lepetymnos. It is approximately 7 km away from Petra.

The permanent residents do jobs related to animal husbandry, farming of olea, and the production of olive oil. A part of the employment is working in the tourist sector of the island, especially during the months of March to November. There are also experienced construction, roofing and wooden construction craftsmen, as well as traditional craftsmen such as stone carvers.

Stipsi is also known for its own, Olive Oil Cooperative of Stipsi, which has one of the most modern olive mills in Lesbos and produces high quality olive oil, standardized for the domestic and foreign markets.

Since the 2000s, the Women's Agrotouristic and Agrotechnical Cooperative (of Stipsi - Ypsilometopon) has also been operating, and its main products being traditional sweets, pasta and also, hand-made embroidery.

The Karavangelis Sports Association, founded in 1978, is also based in Stipsi. This association took its name from the Greek hero, Germanos Karavangelis, who left funding for this in his will. Karavangelis was born in 1866 and grew up in Stipsi. He was known for his service as Metropolitan Bishop of Kastoria and later Amaseia, Pontus and served as a member of the Hellenic Macedonian Committee, one of the major coordinators of the Greek Struggle for Macedonia.

The village has two old and beautiful stone-made churches, the Dormition of the Virgin, "Panagia" (built in 1805), and the Holy Trinity, "Agia Triada" (built in 1924).

== Notable people ==
The following notable people were born in Stypsi:

- 1866: Germanos Karavangelis, a leading figure in the Macedonian Struggle and Metropolitan of Kastoria.
- 1871: Patriarch Benjamin Psomas, who served as Ecumenical Patriarch from 1936 to 1946.
- 1936: Nikolaos Moutafis, a civil engineer specialising in hydroelectric dams and a professor at the National Technical University of Athens, in its School of Civil Engineering. (died 2018).
- 1950: Efstratios Komninakis, a doctor of plastic surgery and holder of a doctorate from the National and Kapodistrian University of Athens, who served as clinic director at Thriasio General Hospital in Athens. (died 2020).
- 1951: Efstratios Chatzidoukakis, a graduate of the Law School of the University of Athens and a senior official in the Law Directorate of the European Commission.
- 1966: Georgios Mantanis, professor at the University of Thessaly and elected member of the International Academy of Wood Science.
