= Walter Liese =

German wood scientist (1926–2023)

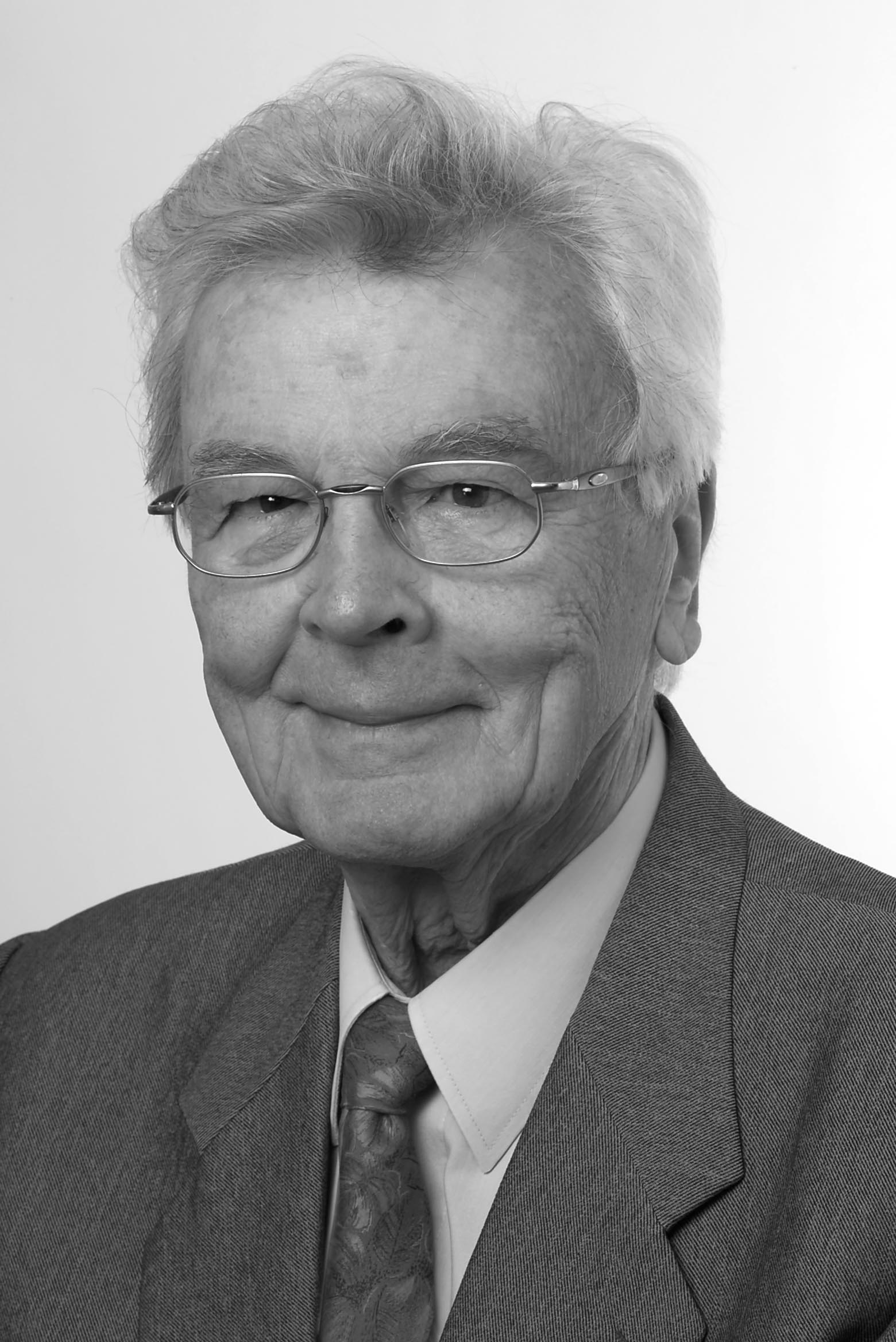

Walter Liese (31 January 1926 – 24 February 2023) was a German forestry and wood researcher and biologist, who was a distinguished fellow of the International Academy of Wood Science.

== Early life and education ==
Liese was born in Berlin on 31 January 1926, and grew up in Eberswalde. He studied forestry at the University of Freiburg and the University of Göttingen. He obtained his PhD in 1951 under Prof. Herbert Zycha.

== Academic and research career ==
In 1963, Liese became Professor at the University of Hamburg. He searched about the wood and bark anatomy, wood quality, bamboo and many other subjects, having more than 500 publications. In 1991, he became an Emeritus professor. He was also honorary member of the Association of German Wood Scientists (Bund Deutscher Holzwirte) and an elected member in the International Academy of Wood Science (IAWS).

Liese was the co-editor of many scientific journals, e.g.:

- Holz als Roh- und Werkstoff
- Wood Science and Technology
- Forstwissenschaftliches Centralblatt
- Cellulose: Chemistry, Technology
- Journal of Tropical Forest Science
- Journal of Bamboo and Rattan
- World Bamboo and Rattan

== Literature ==
- Horst Schulz: Professor Dr. Dr. h.c. mult. Walter Liese – 65 Jahre, in: Holz als Roh- und Werkstoff 49 (1991), P. 75–84 (Today: European Journal of Wood and Wood Products)
- Olaf Schmidt: Walter Liese 75 years young, in: Holzforschung 55 (2001), P. 104–105
- Dieter Eckstein, Uwe Schmitt: Trees and wood for life: Walter Liese 80 years old, in: Wood Science and Technology Volume 40, Number 1, 2–3

== Death ==
Liese died on 24 February 2023, at the age of 97.
