= Andreja Kutnar =

Slovenian academician and wood scientist

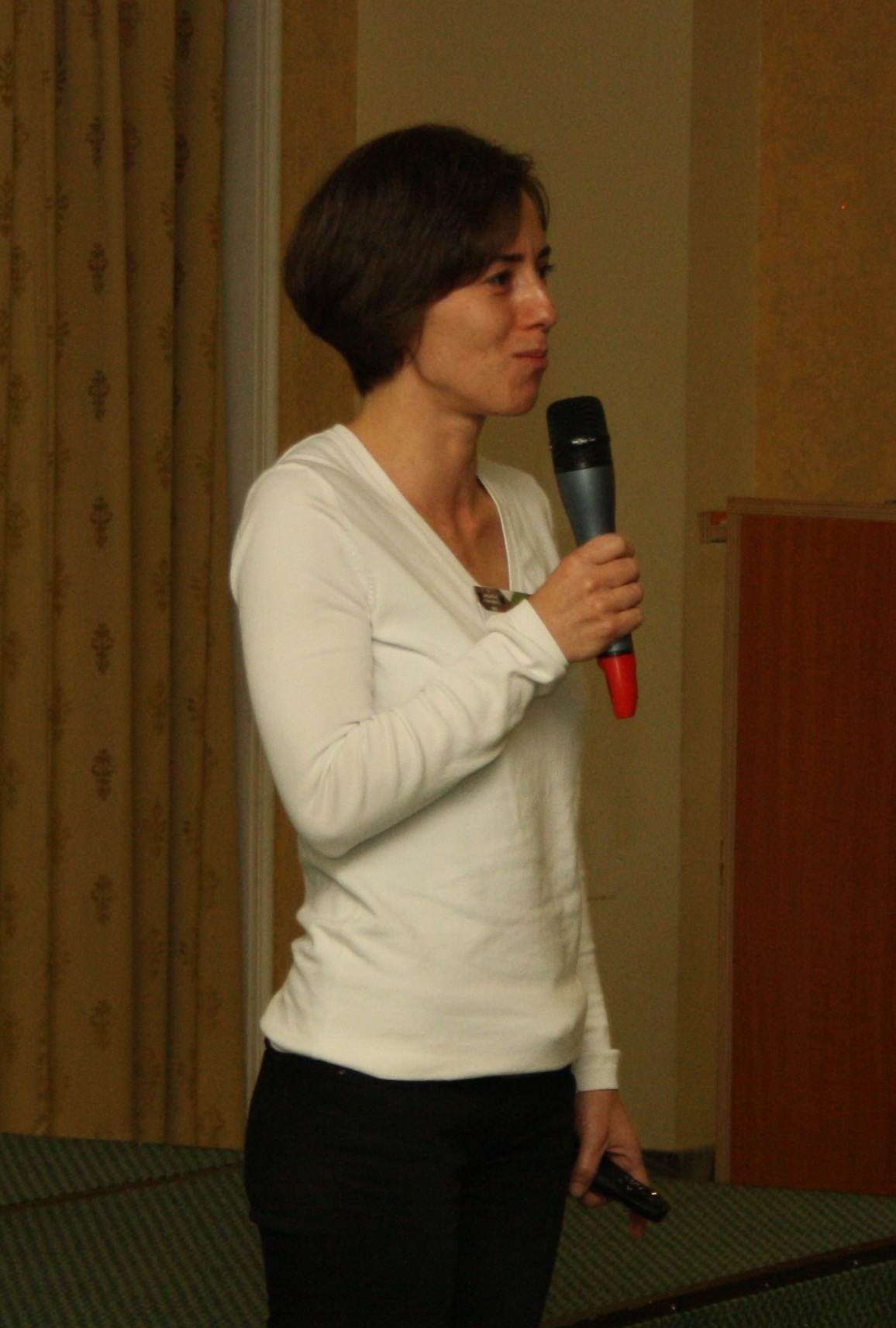
- Born: December 23, 1980 (age 45); Ljubljana, Slovenia
- Education: University of Ljubljana
- Occupations: Researcher; educator; journal co-editor; wood scientist
- Years active: Since 2003
- Known for: Studies on renewable materials for sustainable built environment
- Awards: Fellow of the International Academy of Wood Science
- Scientific career
- Workplaces: University of Primorska; Oregon State University; InnoRenew CoE

Andreja Kutnar (Ljubljana, 23 December 1980) is a Slovenian researcher, wood scientist, and professor at the University of Primorska, who is scientific councillor and former director of the InnoRenew Centre of Excellence (InnoRenew CoE) in Slovenia and co-editor of the scientific journal, Wood Material Science and Engineering.

She is an elected fellow of the International Academy of Wood Science for her academic work. Since June 2026, she serves as the elected Vice President of the IAWS for the period 2026-2029.

== Career ==
She obtained a Bachelor of Science degree in wood science in 2003 and a PhD in wood science in 2008 from the University of Ljubljana, Faculty of Biotechnology, Department of Wood Science and Technology. She subsequently worked at Oregon State University as a postdoctoral researcher before joining the faculty of the University of Primorska in 2009.

Since 2017, Kutnar has been associated with the InnoRenew CoE, a research institute established through the European Union Horizon 2020 Teaming programme, where she served as director and later scientific councillor.

Her research has focused on wood modification, wood densification, wood-based composites, life-cycle assessment, sustainable development of the forest-products sector, and the development of renewable materials for sustainable built environments. She has also contributed to research on timber architecture, restorative environmental design, and regenerative sustainability in construction.

She has served on the Executive Board of InnovaWood and was President of the Society of Wood Science and Technology. She is also a member of the Young Academy of Europe.

In 2018, Kutnar received the Zois Certificate of Recognition for key scientific achievements in wood science. In 2020, she was included in the European Commission's #EUwomen4future campaign highlighting outstanding women in research and innovation.

Until August 2026, the research work of Kutnar has gathered almost 5,000 citations at Google Scholar. In addition, she has authored various scientific publications and books, including Contemporary Slovenian Timber Architecture for Sustainability (2014), Environmental Impacts of Traditional and Innovative Forest-based Bioproducts (2016), and Wood Modification Technologies: Principles, Sustainability, and the Need for Innovation (2021).

== Awards ==
- Prometheus of Science Award for Excellence in Communication (2016).
- Zois Certificate of Recognition for scientific achievements in wood science (2018).
- Featured in the European Commission's #EUwomen4future campaign (2020).
