= Callum A.S. Hill =

Scottish wood scientist

- Born: 1957 (age 68–69)
- Education: Bangor University
- Occupations: Researcher; wood scientist
- Years active: Since 1982
- Awards: Fellow of the IAWS

Callum A.S. Hill (born in 1957) is a Scottish materials chemist and wood scientist, who worked at Bangor University and Edinburgh Napier University, and is an elected fellow of the International Academy of Wood Science.

== Research career ==
Hill started his research in wood science and bio-composites at Bangor University in 1994. Transitioning to Edinburgh Napier University in 2007, he assumed the role of the Edinburgh Research Partnership Chair in renewable materials until 2013. Since 2010, he has served as the director at the JCH Industrial Ecology Ltd, a private consultancy specializing in sustainability.

His research contributions in chemical and thermal modification of wood, and lignocellulosic fibres have been well recorded.

He currently holds the position of senior consultant at the Norwegian Institute for Bioeconomy Research in Ås, Norway. His research contributions have gained international recognition especially his book entitled Wood Modification in 2007, having >3,100 citations. In total, he has had almost 17,000 citations for his research works at the Google Scholar, possessing an h-index of 58.

In October 2023, a meta-research carried out by John Ioannidis et al. at Stanford University, included Callum Hill in Elsevier Data 2022, where he was ranked at the top 2% of researchers in wood science (forestry – materials), having a composite index of 4.023, the highest one in this scientific area globally. He was also included in the Elsevier Data in 2024 and 2025.

As of March 2026, the research work of Hill has received 13,300 citations at Scopus.
