= Raymond A. Young =

American materials researcher, wood scientist and emeritus professor

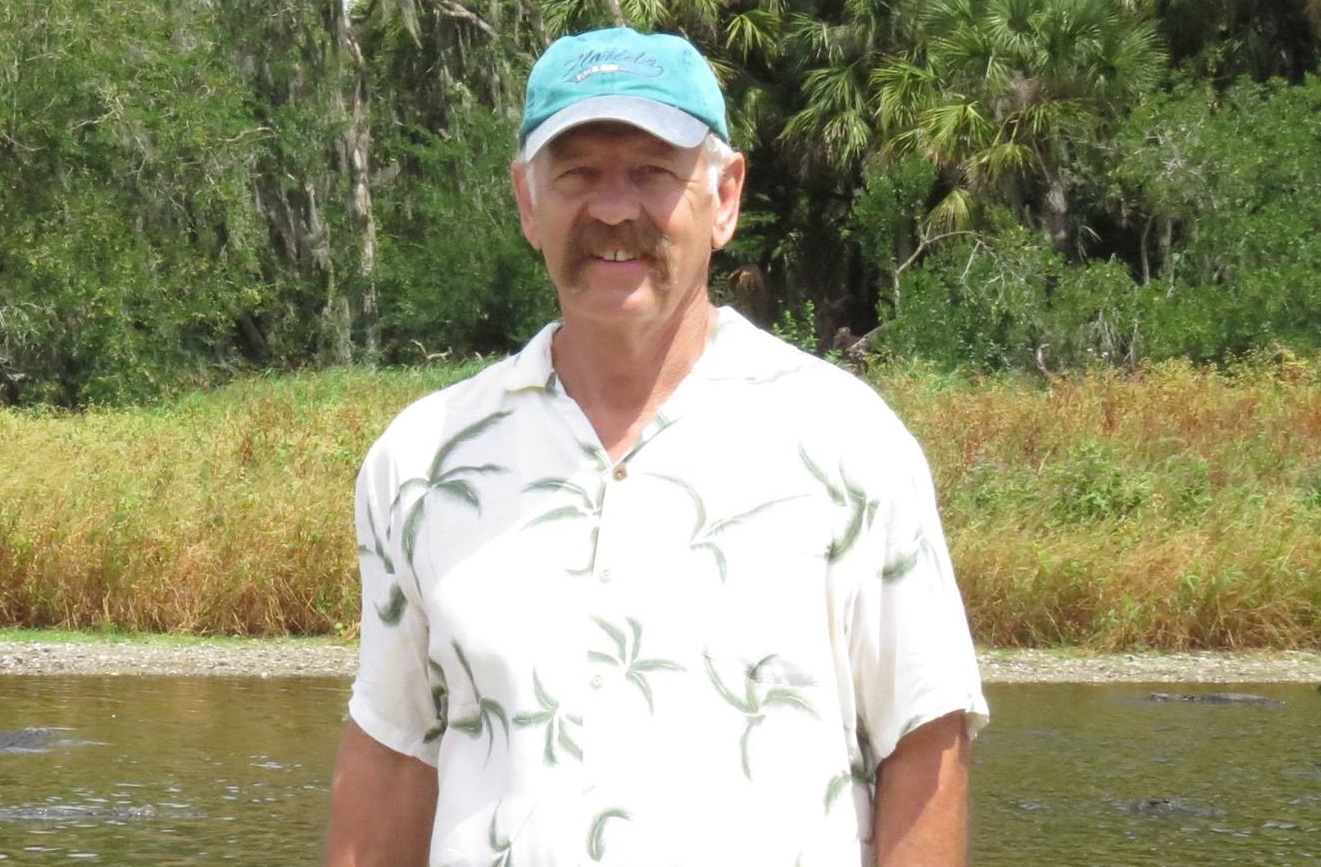
- Born: March 14, 1945 (age 81); Buffalo, New York
- Education: University of Washington
- Occupations: Researcher; educator; natural materials scientist; wood scientist
- Years active: Since 1966
- Awards: Fellow of the IAWS
- Scientific career
- Workplaces: Kimberly-Clark Corporation; University of Wisconsin-Madison
- Doctoral students: John Ralph; Stéphane Quideau; George Mantanis

Raymond Allen Young (born March 14, 1945) is an American materials researcher, wood scientist and emeritus professor at the University of Wisconsin-Madison, who is an elected fellow (FIAWS) of the International Academy of Wood Science.

== Biography ==
Young was born in Buffalo, New York and grew up in Syracuse. He graduated from the Central Technical High School in Syracuse in 1962, and earned a bachelor of science degree in Wood Products Engineering from the State University of New York (SUNY) and Syracuse University in 1966. He also obtained a MSc degree in Cellulose Chemistry from SUNY-Syracuse University in 1968.

From 1968 to 1969, he worked as a process supervisor in pulp and paper production at Kimberly-Clark Corp. in Niagara Falls, New York. He then pursued his doctorate studies, including a Fulbright scholarship in 1972 at the Royal Institute of Technology in Stockholm, Sweden. He eventually obtained his PhD degree in Wood and Polymer Chemistry from the University of Washington at Seattle in October 1973 under the guidance of Professor K.V. Sarkanen. He also held in years 1973-1975 a post-doctoral fellowship in fiber chemistry at the Textile Research Institute in Princeton, NJ, which was associated with the Princeton University.

Between 1975 and 2004, Young served as a researcher and professor in the Department of Forestry at the University of Wisconsin in Madison, Wisconsin, focusing on wood chemistry and natural products chemistry. He has been a visiting professor and scholar at several research institutes and universities in Sweden, China, Japan, New Zealand, Mexico, Indonesia, Taiwan, Brazil, Turkey, and Greece. He served as a member in the editorial boards of the journals, Wood Science and Technology, and Wood and Fiber Science. Since 2004, he has held the title of emeritus professor at the University of Wisconsin-Madison.

His scientific work includes more than 180 research papers, eight books and nine international patents. Young's primary research work, which has received until June 2024 almost 7,000 international citations (h-index: 48), has focused mostly on the plasma modification of natural and synthetic materials, bonding and adhesion in composite materials, new wood pulping methods, and the chemistry of natural products.

== Recognition ==
In 1997, Young was elected as a Fellow at the International Academy of Wood Science (IAWS) for his yearlong research contributions in the area of wood chemistry and science.

Young and Denes were among the first scientists who initiated research studies on plasma chemistry of cellulosic fibers during the '90s.

Throughout his career, Young has received several awards for his research work:

- Wisconsin Governor's Energy Innovation Award (2004)
- Senior Fulbright Scholar - Aristotle University of Thessaloniki, Greece (1989)
- Japanese Photopolymer Award - Plasma Chemistry (2000)
- National Academy of Scientific Exchange Award - 1st in Poland (1979) & in former Yugoslavia (1979); 2nd in Romania (1990)

In October 2023, a referenced meta-research conducted by John Ioannidis and his team at Stanford University included R.A. Young in the Elsevier Data 2022, where he was ranked in the top 2% of researchers of all time in wood chemistry (polymers – forestry), having a c-index 3.170.

== Personal life ==
Young lives permanently in Sarasota, Florida with his wife, Kathryn Young. From his first marriage, Young has had two sons, Tim and Erik. Tim Young is a university professor of astrophysics at the University of North Dakota.

During his retirement, Young has written some other books, namely, "Polynesian and the Polynesians: An Overview", "Perfumes and Perfumery: An Overview", "A Sabbatical in Greece: Thessaloniki and Mt Athos", and one book about his family heritage entitled, "Young Family Genealogy: From the Coal Mines & Steel Mills".

== Scientific books ==
Young has published several scientific books:

- Modified Cellulosics (1978), by Roger M. Rowell and Raymond A. Young, Academic Press, ASIN: B01D4CHXS2, 592 pp.
- Introduction to Forest Ecosystem Science and Management (2003), by Raymond A. Young and Ronald L. Giese, Wiley, ISBN 0471331457, 592 pp.
- Environmentally Friendly Technologies for the Pulp and Paper Industry (1998), by Raymond A. Young and Masood Akhtar, Eds. Wiley, ISBN 0471157708, 592 pp.
- Paper and Composites from Agro-Based Resources (1997), by Roger M. Rowell, Raymond A. Young, Judith Rowell, CRC Press, ISBN 1566702356, 464 pp.
- Cellulose: Structure, Modification and Hydrolysis (1986), by Raymond A. Young and Roger M. Rowell, Krieger Pub Co, ISBN 0471827614, 400 pp.
- Introduction to Forest Science (1982 & 1990), by Raymond A. Young, Wiley, ISBN 0471064386, 554 pp.
