= Geoffrey Daniel (wood scientist) =

Swedish wood scientist and professor emeritus

- Born: Geoffrey Daniel
- Known for: Biological degradation of wood
- Scientific career
- Fields: Wood science and technology Forest products
- Workplaces: Swedish University of Agricultural Sciences

Geoffrey Daniel (born 1957) is a British-born Swedish wood scientist and professor emeritus at the Swedish University of Agricultural Sciences (SLU) in Sweden, who is an elected fellow (FIAWS) of the International Academy of Wood Science

== Research career ==
Daniel began his career in marine biology but transitioned to wood science upon joining SLU in Uppsala, Sweden. He started as a research assistant at the Department of Forest Products and progressed to roles including Docent, Senior Lecturer, and Chair in Forest Products. For the last 15 years of his active career, he served as Chair in Wood Science and later as Senior Advisor. He also led two Centres of Excellence focusing on pulp and paper industries, as well as tree cell wall biosynthesis and fibre biology.

He has been a member of the editorial board of the referred wood-related journal, Holzforschung.

Daniel's research focuses on the ultrastructure and macromolecular structure of fibre cell walls, including their biodegradation. He has emphasized the importance of understanding these structures to improve wood modification, fungal degradation mechanisms, and wood protection strategies. He has published over 330 scientific articles, with more than 10,000 citations.

In 2023, following his retirement, Daniel was awarded the SLU's Great Medal for distinguished service and research work.
