= Rainer Marutzky =

German scientist (born 1947)

Rainer Marutzky (Halle, 1947) is a German wood scientist, who is emeritus professor of wood chemistry at the Technical University of Braunschweig and former director of the Fraunhofer Institute for Wood Research, Wilhelm Klauditz Institute (WKI) in Braunschweig, Germany.

== Biography ==
He was born on 11 August 1947 in Halle, Germany.

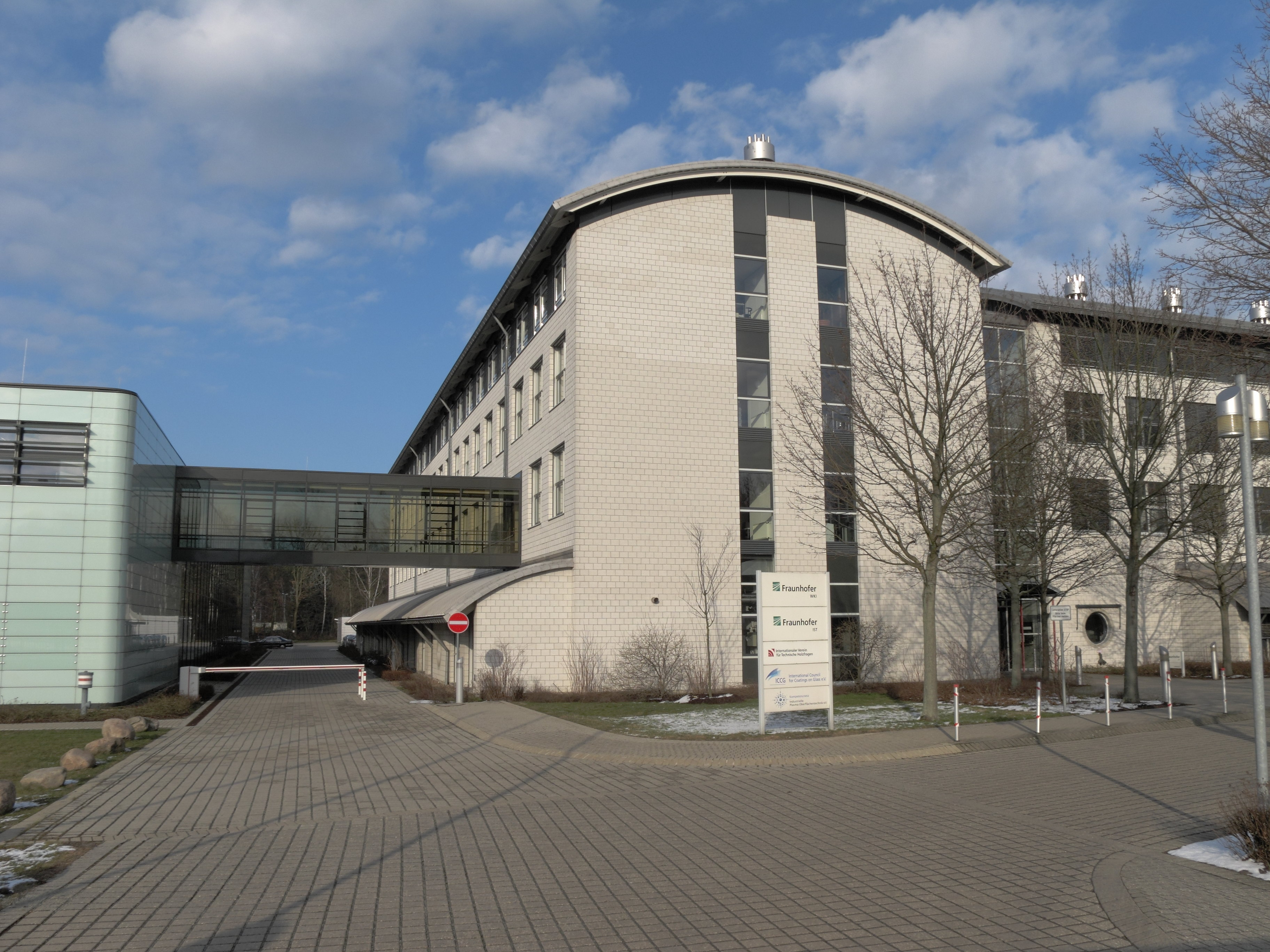
View of Wilhelm Klauditz Institut (WKI) – Prof. Marutzky was director of the WKI in the period 1989-2009

In 1968, following his military service, he pursued studies in chemistry at the Technical University of Braunschweig from 1968 to 1973. Under the mentorship of Professor Karl Wagner, he earned his doctoral degree and subsequently served as a post-doctoral fellow at the Society for Biotechnology in Braunschweig-Stöckheim, specializing in enzyme chemistry. In 1976, he became a memmer of the Fraunhofer Institute for Wood Research as a research associate.

He successfully completed his habilitation at the Institute of Natural Sciences at the Technische Universität Braunschweig in 1991. He was appointed as university professor in 1996. His pioneering research work was predominantly related to the deleterious emissions from the wood-based products and the industrial environment. He was also actively engaged in European standardization initiatives. Marutzky held the position of director of the Fraunhofer WKI from 1989 until December 2009, when he was officially retired.

His yearlong efforts are evidenced by many publications in both German and international scientific journals, along with his participation as a keynote speaker and expert at various international scientific symposia.

== International recognition ==
In 1988, Marutzky along with Edmone Roffael and Lutz Mehlhorn were awarded by the International Association iVTH for their research work on the topic "Investigations on the formaldehyde emissions from wood-based materials and other materials, and the development of methods to reduce formaldehyde emission potential." He has also received several other awards in the field of wood science and technology.

Presently, he is a technical advisor to the International Association for Technical Wood Matters (iVTH).
