= Gerd Wegener =

German wood scientist and professor emeritus

- Born: Gerd Wegener; 1945 (age 80–81)
- Education: University of Hamburg
- Known for: Wood chemistry and wood-based materials
- Scientific career
- Fields: Wood science and technology Forestry
- Workplaces: LMU Munich; Technical University of Munich

Gerd Wegener (born 1945) is a German wood scientist and professor emeritus known for his contributions to wood chemistry and to ultrastructure of wood. He is a fellow (FIAWS) of the International Academy of Wood Science, and has been the editor-in-chief for scientific journals Wood Science and Technology and European Journal of Wood and Wood Products from 1994 to 2013.

He served as a professor at both LMU Munich and the Technical University of Munich (TUM), where he also directed wood research departments.

== Research career ==
Wegener began his academic journey studying structural engineering at the Technical University of Munich from 1964 to 1966. He then pursued wood science at the University of Hamburg, completing his studies in 1970. He earned his doctorate in forestry from LMU Munich in 1975 and achieved his habilitation in 1986, receiving the LMU Habilitation Award for his work.

From 1975 to 1986, Wegener served as a research associate at LMU's Department of Wood Studies and Wood Technology. He became an adjunct teaching professor at LMU in 1986 and was appointed full professor and director of wood research in 1993. In 2000, he transitioned to TUM, where he continued his role as professor and director of wood research until his retirement in 2010.

The research projects of Wegener have focused on wood sustainable use, paper making, as well as on chemical products and energy recovery. He also has developed with his group some new wood-based materials with enhanced properties.

Additionally, in 1983, he co-authored the referred book Wood: Chemistry, Ultrastructure, Reactions, which -until September 2026- has been cited over than 6,000 times.

== Recognition ==
His contributions to wood science have been well recognised:

- Elected Fellow of the International Academy of Wood Science (1988)
- Cross of the Order of Merit of the Federal Republic of Germany (2009)
- Schweighofer Prize for innovation in the European wood industry (2009)
- Bavarian State Medal in Gold for services to forestry and wood industry (2016)
- IAWS Distinguished Service Award (2019)
