= John Ralph =

American academic (born 1954)

- Born: October 10, 1954 (age 72); Canterbury, New Zealand
- Education: University of Wisconsin-Madison
- Occupations: Researcher; educator; wood scientist
- Years active: Since 1976
- Scientific career
- Workplaces: New Zealand Forest Research Institute; University of California, Berkeley; University of Wisconsin-Madison
- Thesis: Reactions of lignin model quinone methides and NMR studies of lignins (1982)
- Doctoral advisor: Raymond A. Young; Larry Landucci

John Ralph (Canterbury, 10 October 1954) is a New Zealand-born, American chemist, wood scientist, and emeritus professor at the University of Wisconsin-Madison in the Department of Biochemistry. He is an elected fellow (FIAWS) of the International Academy of Wood Science and a fellow of the American Association for the Advancement of Science (FAAAS).

Ralph received the Anselme Payen Award in 2013 by the American Chemical Society for his novel research contributions to the science and chemical technology of cellulose and mostly in lignin chemistry. In 2024, Ralph, along with Belgian biochemist Wout Boerjan, received the prestigious Marcus Wallenberg Prize for the yearlong research on lignin chemistry.

== Early life and education ==
Ralph was born in Canterbury, New Zealand, where he grew up. He earned his BSc (Hons) degree in chemistry from the University of Canterbury in 1976. In 1982, he received his PhD by carrying out studies on lignins using NMR, at the University of Wisconsin-Madison under the supervision of Raymond A. Young of the Department of Forestry and Larry Landucci of the Forest Products Laboratory.

== Research career ==
Following his role as a research scientist at the Forest Research Institute in Rotorua between 1974 and 1987, Ralph assumed the position of scientific head at the Research Laboratory for Nuclear Magnetic Resonance Spectroscopy in Chemistry at the University of California, Berkeley.

Between 1988 and 2008, Ralph was a research chemist at the USDA-ARS U.S. Dairy Forage Research Center in Madison, Wisconsin, holding joint appointments in the Departments of Forestry and Biological Systems Engineering at the University of Wisconsin.

In 2008, Ralph was appointed a professor in the Department of Biochemistry at the University of Wisconsin-Madison. Since 2015, he has held the title of distinguished professor at the Tokyo University of Agriculture and Technology. Ralph currently sits on the editorial boards of several journals, including BioEnergy Research, Journal of Wood Chemistry and Technology, Holzforschung, and Journal Science of Food and Agriculture.

== Recognition ==
Ralph received the Anselme Payen Award in 2013 from the American Chemical Society for his research contributions in lignin chemistry. In October 2023, a referenced meta-research carried out by John Ioannidis and his team at the Stanford University, included Ralph in Elsevier Data 2022, where he was ranked in the global top 2% of researchers of all time in the area of chemical biology (plant biology – organic chemistry).

His referred review work titled Lignin biosynthesis, which was published in 2003 at the journal Annual Review of Plant Biology, has received until June 2025, more than 6,100 international citations.

Ralph was recipient of the 2023 Lifetime Achievement Award from the International Symposium of Wood, Fiber, and Pulping Chemistry in Venice. He is also a distinguished professor at Tokyo University of Agriculture and Technology. Up to June 2024, Ralph has received more than 69,000 international citations for his research works in Google Scholar and has an h-index of 134.

== Areas of specialisation ==
- Biosynthesis of lignin (including the delineation of pathways), structure of lignin, chemistry of lignin, reactions of lignin.
- Analysis of the impacts of disturbing lignin biosynthesis, with extensions aimed at restructuring lignins for enhanced degradability to facilitate improved lignocellulosic bioprocessing.
- Formulation of synthetic methods for various biosynthetic products, precursors, intermediates, molecular markers, and cell wall model compounds.
- Utilization of solution-state NMR, with a focus on cell wall components, particularly lignins; development of methods; application of NMR to unfractionated cell walls.
- Examination of the mechanisms which are involved in the cross-linking of wood cell walls.
- Implementing analytical methods for the cell wall structure using NMR, GC-MS and other techniques.
- Devising techniques for the production of commodity phenolic chemicals from lignin and plant cell wall aromatics.
