= Roger M. Rowell =

American academic and wood scientist (born 1939)

- Born: November 28, 1939 (age 86); Wichita, Kansas
- Education: Purdue University
- Occupations: Researcher; educator; materials scientist; wood scientist
- Years active: Since 1964
- Scientific career
- Workplaces: University of Birmingham; Forest Products Laboratory; University of Wisconsin-Madison

Roger M. Rowell (Wichita, Kansas; November 28, 1939) is an American biochemist and wood scientist of the Forest Products Laboratory at Madison, and emeritus professor at the University of Wisconsin-Madison, who is an elected fellow (FIAAM) of the International Association for Advanced Materials and an elected fellow (FIAWS) of the International Academy of Wood Science.

== Education and career ==
He obtained his bachelor of science degree in chemistry and mathematics from Southwestern College in Kansas in 1961, followed by an MSc degree in biochemistry from Purdue University in 1963. He got his PhD in biochemistry at the Purdue University in 1965, under the supervision of Professor R.L. Whistler.

Between 1966 and 2007, Rowell served as a leading research chemist at the USDA – Forest Products Laboratory in Madison, Wisconsin, with professorship appointments in the departments of Forestry and Biological Systems Engineering at the University of Wisconsin in Madison.

Since 2009, he holds the title of emeritus professor at the University of Wisconsin-Madison. His work includes more than 300 research papers, several international patents, and many conference presentations. Rowell's primary research has focused on biomaterials, wood chemistry, carbohydrate chemistry and chemical modification of wood.

He has been a visiting professor and scholar at several research institutes and universities in countries such as Japan, Sweden, China, Norway, South Korea, New Zealand. Rowell has served as a member of the editorial boards of various journals, including Forest Products Journal, Wood Science and Technology, and Wood Material Science and Engineering.

== Recognition ==
In 1991, Rowell received an award from the American Chemical Society for his research contributions in wood chemistry, primarily related to the acetylation of wood.

Rowell has been an elected fellow in the Cellulose, Paper and Textile Division of the American Chemical Society, and also, a fellow in the Japan Society for the Promotion of Science. In 2009 he received the Outstanding Scientist Award of the USDA Forest Service as the research scientist of the year.

In October 2023, a referenced meta-research conducted by John Ioannidis and his team at Stanford University included Roger M. Rowell in Elsevier Data 2022, where he was ranked in the global top 2% of researchers of all time in the area of wood chemistry ("forestry – chemistry").

== Personal life ==
Rowell lives permanently in Madison, Wisconsin, and has been married with Judith Kay since 1961.

== Books ==
- "Handbook of Wood Chemistry and Wood Composites" (2005), Taylor and Francis, Boca Raton, FL, 487 pp.
- "Paper and composites from agro-based resources" (1996), CRC Lewis Publishers, Boca Raton, FL, 446 pp.
- "Materials interactions relevant to recycling of wood-based materials" (1992), Materials Research Society Symposium Proceedings, Vol 266, 306 pp.
- "Emerging technologies for materials and chemicals from biomass" (1992), Symposium Series 476, Am. Chem. Soc., Washington, D.C., 469 pp.
- "Archaeological Wood: Properties, Chemistry, and Preservation" (1990), American Chemical Society Advances in Chemistry Series 225, Washington, DC, 472 pp.
- "Chemistry of Solid Wood" (1984), American Chemical Society, Advances in Chemistry Series No. 207, Washington, D.C., 614 pp.
