= Kyosti Vilho Sarkanen =

Finnish and American lignin chemist and wood scientist

Kyösti Sarkanen
- Born: Kyösti Vilho Sarkanen; 25 September 1921; Helsinki, Finland
- Died: 24 December 1990 (aged 69); Seattle, U.S.
- Education: SUNY, Syracuse University
- Occupations: Researcher; educator; research chemist; wood scientist
- Years active: 1947–1990
- Scientific career
- Workplaces: University of Washington
- Doctoral students: Raymond A. Young; Vincent L. Chang; Yuan-Zong Lai; John Karna

Kyösti Vilho Sarkanen (25 September 1921 – 24 December 1990) was a Finnish and American organic chemist and wood scientist, who served as a Professor at the University of Washington in Seattle. He was the honorary recipient of the Anselme Payen Award in 1979 from the American Chemical Society, and an elected fellow of the International Academy of Wood Science.

== Biography ==
Sarkanen was born and grew up in Helsinki. He did his undergraduate studies in chemistry at the University of Helsinki. Later in the years 1947–1951, he was employed at the Finnish Pulp and Paper Research Institute.

He afterwards left for the US and completed his MSc degree in 1952, followed by the Doctor of Philosophy (PhD) degree in the field of organic (lignin) chemistry in 1956. Both degrees were granted from the State University of New York, College of Forestry at Syracuse University, under the direction of Professor Conrad Schuerch. Following that, Sarkanen assumed an academic position at the College of Forestry at the University of Washington in 1959, where he dedicated his efforts to both pedagogy and scholarly research until his retirement in 1988.

His research contributions in wood chemistry, particularly lignin chemistry, have been recorded and widely acclaimed. During his career, Sarkanen authored many publications on the subject of wood chemistry, and his contributions earned him several awards in recognition of his scholarly achievements. In addition to the Anselme Payen Award, Sarkanen received the Gadolin Medal Award from the Society of Finnish Chemists in 1988, and also (posthumously) the Paul W. Magnabosco Outstanding Member Award of the TAPPI in 1991. He has held more than 1,700 citations for his research works in Scopus.

== Selected works ==
- Lignins: Occurrence, formation, structure and reactions; edited by K. V. Sarkanen and C. H. Ludwig, John Wiley & Sons, Inc., New York, 1971
