= Philip D. Evans =

British-Canadian wood scientist

Philip David Evans
- Born: 1958 (age 67–68); Chelsea, London
- Education: Bangor University
- Occupations: Researcher; educator; wood scientist
- Years active: Since 1986
- Known for: Wood protection Wood surface chemistry
- Awards: British Columbia Leadership Chair in Advanced Forest Products Manufacturing Technology; Fellow of the International Academy of Wood Science
- Scientific career
- Workplaces: University of British Columbia, Australian National University

Philip D. Evans (born 1958) is a British-Canadian wood scientist and emeritus professor at the University of British Columbia (UBC), who is an elected fellow (FIAWS) and distinguished member of the International Academy of Wood Science.

He currently holds the British Columbia Leadership Chair in Advanced Forest Products Manufacturing Technology at UBC, and also, is honorary professor in the Department of Materials Physics at the Australian National University.

== Early life and studies ==
Evans was born in Chelsea, London, in 1958. As the son of a Welsh Guardsman, he spent much of his early life on military bases in Cyprus and Germany. He attended ten schools by the age of ten before receiving a scholarship to attend Woolverstone Hall, a progressive state-run boarding school in Suffolk. Evans earned a degree in forestry and wood science (summa cum laude) from the University College of North Wales (now Bangor University), where he developed a lasting interest in wood anatomy and wood protection. He completed his PhD on the hydrolysis of wood surfaces.

== Research career ==
After completing his doctorate studies, Evans worked at the Dundee Institute of Technology on high-pressure sap displacement in spruce wood. In 1986, he moved to Australia to become a lecturer at the Australian National University, where he taught wood science and processing. At ANU, he focused on the weathering and protection of wood, collaborating with organizations including CSIRO and Japan's Forestry and Forest Products Research Institute (FFPRI). He worked upon the understanding of the photodegradation of wood and the use of UV stabilizers and chemical modifications.

In 2001, Evans joined the University of British Columbia in Vancouver. Initially as the director of UBC's Centre for Advanced Wood Processing, he later returned to full-time research and teaching, establishing international collaborations and applying advanced imaging techniques such as transmission electron microscopy (TEM), X-ray micro-CT and DART-TOF mass spectrometry to study wood microstructure.

Evans worked on wood surface degradation and protection, describing the rapid surface delignification of wood due to environmental exposure and developed new approaches to mitigate UV-induced damage. His research also includes studies on wood surface checking and durability, and has received -until June 2025- more than 5,000 citations at Google Scholar.

He has been a member of the editorial boards of the wood-related journals, International Wood Products Journal and Forest Products Journal. In 2009, he was elected as a British Columbia Leadership Chair in Advanced Forest Products Manufacturing Technology at the UBC in Vancouver.

In October 2023, a meta-research carried out by John Ioannidis et al. at Stanford University included Philip Evans in Elsevier Data 2022, where he was ranked in the top 2% of researchers in wood science (forestry – materials), having a c-score of 3.369, while in August 2024, he also acquired the same high ranking.
