= Alfred Teischinger =

Austrian professor and wood scientist (born 1954)

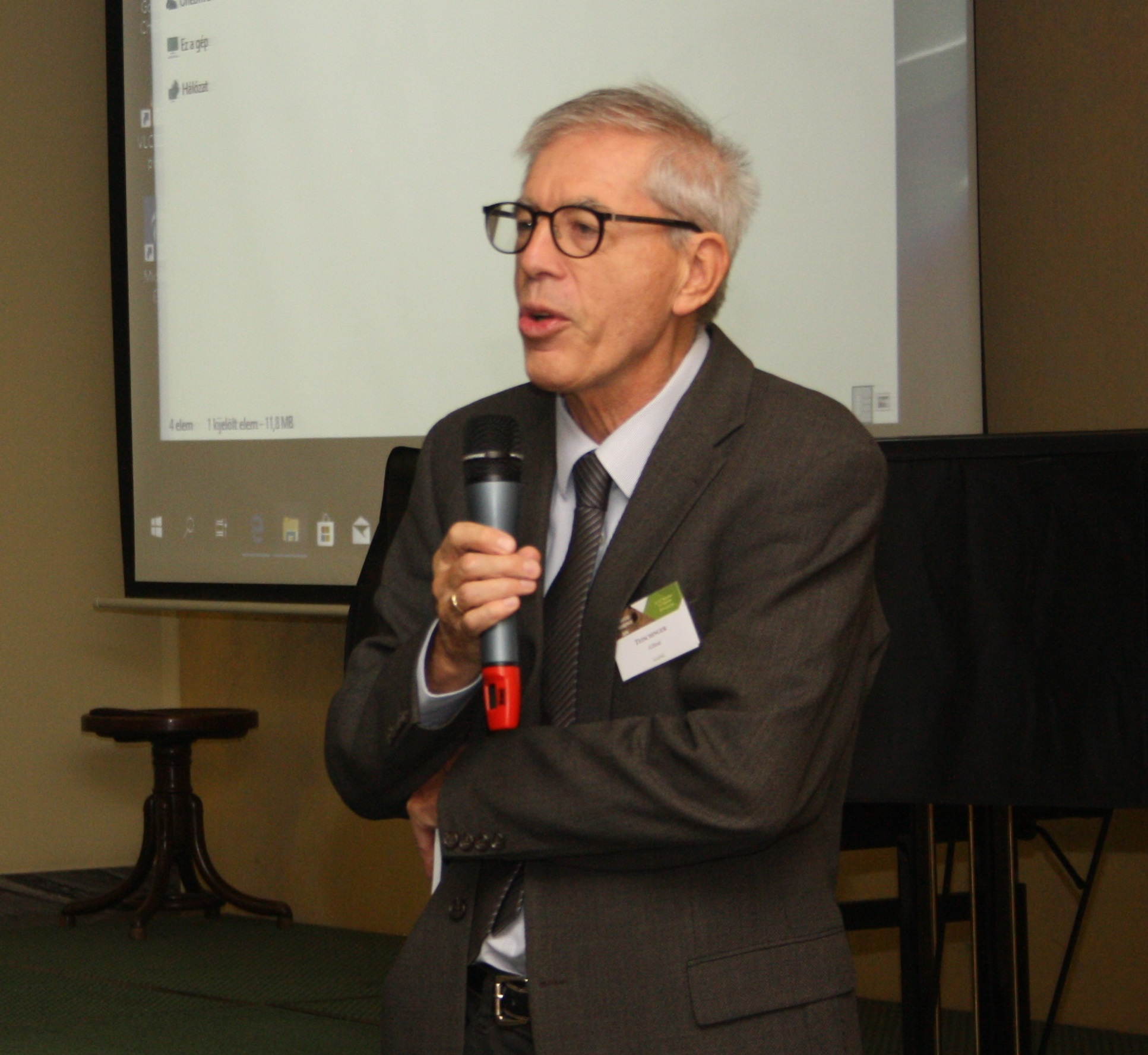
- Born: 1954 (age 71–72)
- Education: BOKU
- Occupations: Researcher; educator; wood scientist and technologist
- Years active: since 1980

Alfred Teischinger (born 1954) is an Austrian wood scientist and technologist and emeritus professor at the University of Natural Resources and Life Sciences (BOKU), who is an elected fellow (FIAWS) of the International Academy of Wood Science.

== Research career ==
Teischinger earned his doctorate degree in wood technology at the University of Natural Resources and Life Sciences (BOKU) in Vienna (1988). In the period 1991–2000, he transitioned to the position of assistant professor in wood technology and became the head of the accredited testing laboratory at the higher technical college in Mödling in Austria. In the years 1990–2000, he served as editor-in-chief at the scientific journal Holzforschung und Holzverwertung.

Later, in 2000, he became full-time professor of wood technology at BOKU. From 2001 to 2015, he also served as the scientific director of the Competence Centre for Wood Composites and Wood Chemistry (Wood Kplus).

His main research interests include several subjects of wood technology. Until March 2024, he has published and presented more than 200 research and technological works in several international journals, conferences and symposia.

In March 2019, as an elected fellow, he received the highest recognition at the International Academy of Wood Science by presenting in Graz the IAWS academy lecture, which was titled ‘’Wood technology in the course of time’’.

He retired from BOKU in August 2019. In 2023, along with the wood scientists Peter Niemz and Dick Sandberg, he edited the referenced edition of Springer Handbook of Wood Science and Technology.

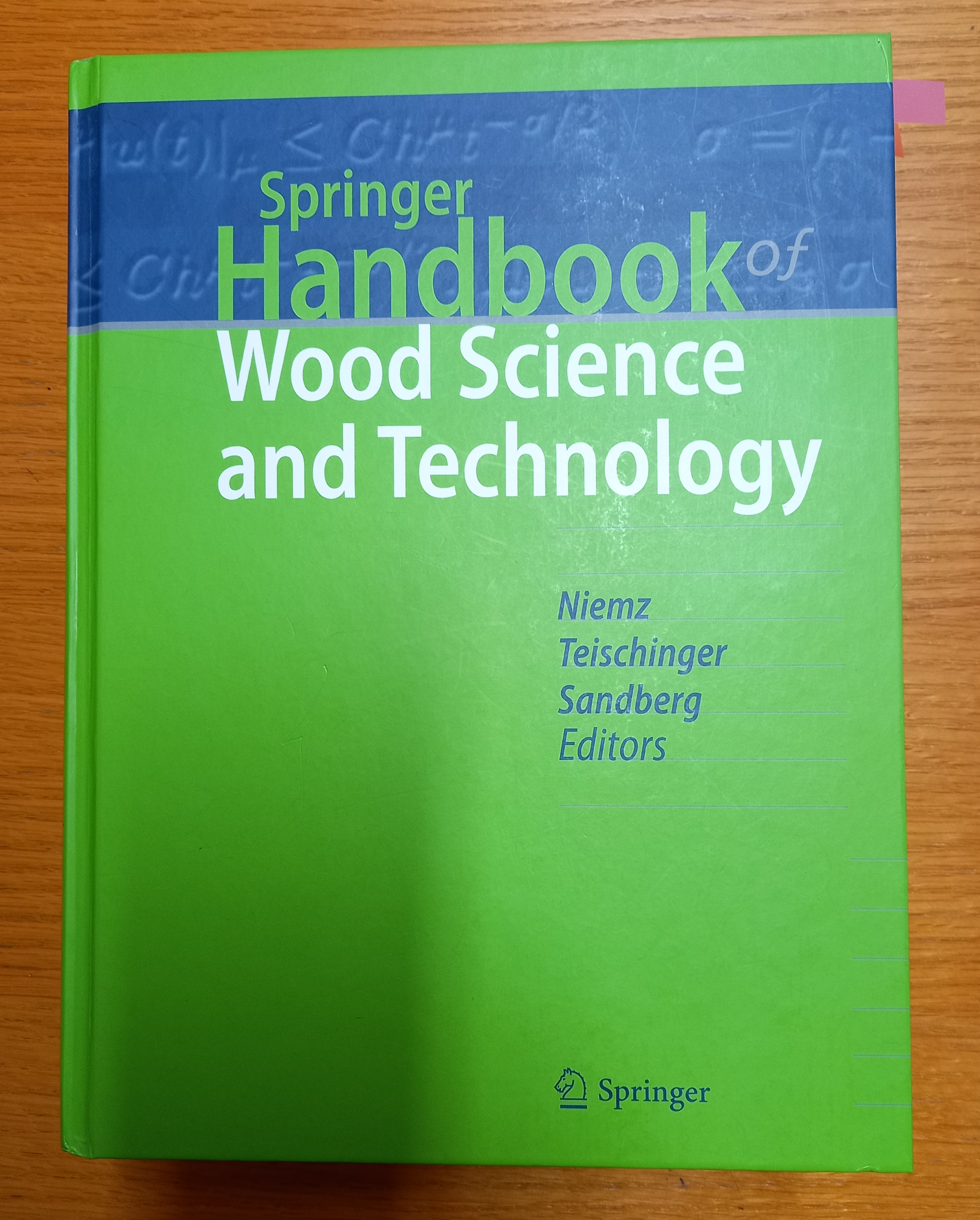
Springer Handbook of Wood Science and Technology

== Awards ==
Alfred Teischinger has received several awards in the area of wood technology during his yearlong career.

- 2023: HolzbauPrize
- 2019: Academy Lecture, IAWS
- 2016: Fellow Award, Society of Wood Science and Technology (SWST)
- 2013: Fellow Award, The International Academy of Wood Science
- 2008: Dr. Wolfgang Houska Preis 2007, B&C Privatstiftung
- 2007: Best Book Design from all over the World 2007, Stiftung Buchkunst
- 2006: Stern Award, Silver Medal, Oil and Colour Chemists Association of Austria
