= Carl Sagan Institute =

Institute for the search of habitable worlds

Coordinates: 42.448510°N 76.478620°W

The Carl Sagan Institute: Pale Blue Dot and Beyond was founded in 2014 at Cornell University in Ithaca, New York to further the search for habitable planets and moons in and outside the Solar System. It is focused on the characterization of exoplanets and the instruments to search for signs of life in the universe. The founder and current director of the institute is astronomer Lisa Kaltenegger.

The institute, inaugurated in 2014 and renamed on 9 May 2015, collaborates with international institutions on fields such as astrophysics, engineering, earth and atmospheric science, geology and biology with the goal of taking an interdisciplinary approach to the search for life elsewhere in the universe and of the origin of life on Earth.

Carl Sagan was a faculty member at Cornell University beginning in 1968. He was the David Duncan Professor of Astronomy and Space Sciences and director of the Laboratory for Planetary Studies there until his death in 1996.

== Research ==
The main goal of the Carl Sagan Institute is to model atmospheric spectral signatures including biosignatures of known and hypothetical planets and moons to explore whether they could be habitable and how they could be detected. Their research focuses on exoplanets and moons orbiting in the habitable zone around their host stars. The atmospheric characterization of such worlds would allow researchers to potentially detect the first habitable exoplanet. A team member has already produced a "color catalog" that could help scientists look for signs of life on exoplanets.

=== Bioreflectance spectra catalog ===
Team scientists used 137 different microorganism species, including extremophiles that were isolated from Earth's most extreme environments, and cataloged how each life form uniquely reflects sunlight in the visible and near-infrared to the short-wavelength infrared (0.35–2.5 μm) portions of the electromagnetic spectrum. This database of individual 'reflection fingerprints' (spectrum) might be used by astronomers as potential biosignatures to find large colonies of microscopic life on distant exoplanets. A combination of organisms would produce a mixed spectrum, also cataloged, of light bouncing off the planet. The method will also be applied to spot vegetation. The goal of the catalog is to provide astronomers with a baseline comparison to help scientists interpret the data that will come back from telescopes like the Nancy Grace Roman Space Telescope and the European Extremely Large Telescope.

Ultraviolet radiation on life forms could also induce biofluorescence in visible wavelengths. An exoplanet orbiting an M-type star with these life forms would glow when exposed to solar flares, allowing it to be detected by the new generations of space observatories.

=== Other catalogs and models ===
Institute scientists have catalogued the spectral emissions and albedo of Solar System objects, including all eight planets, nine moons, and two dwarf planets. They have also modeled Earth's atmosphere throughout geological history. Exoplanets with similar conditions to early Earth are considered candidates for emerging life forms.

== See also ==
- Astrobiology – Science concerned with life in the universe
- Exoplanetology
- Lists of planets
- Methods of detecting exoplanets
- Pale Blue Dot
