= Lisa Kaltenegger =

Austrian astronomer

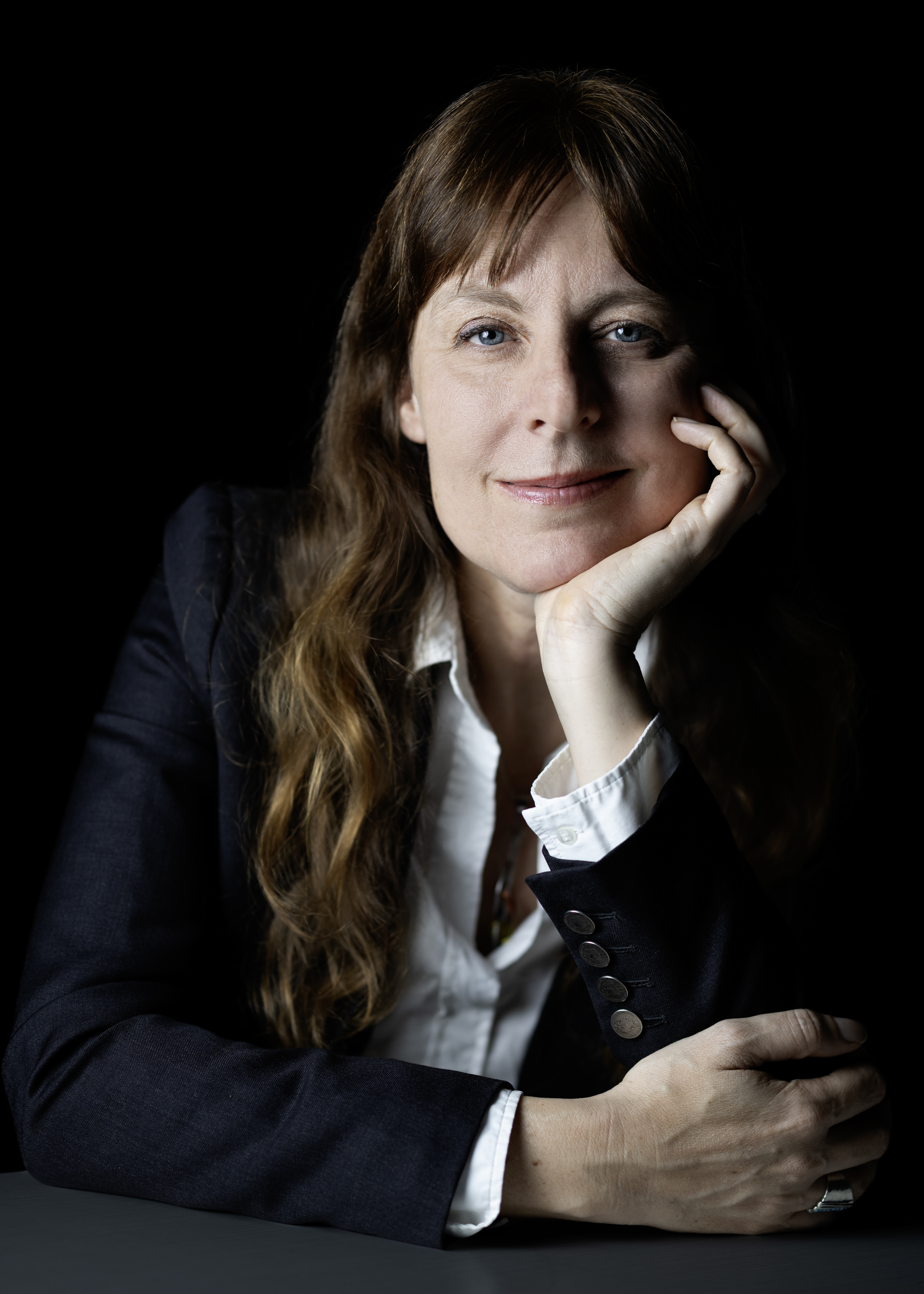
- Lisa Kaltenegger in 2025
- Born: 4 March 1977 (age 49); Kuchl, Austria
- Known for: Exoplanet atmospheres
- Scientific career
- Fields: Astrophysics; Exoplanets
- Workplaces: Cornell University; Carl Sagan Institute

Lisa Kaltenegger (born 4 March 1977) is an Austrian astronomer specialising in the modeling and characterization of exoplanets and the search for life. On 1 July 2014, she was appointed Associate Professor of Astronomy at Cornell University. Previously, she held a joint position at the Max Planck Institute for Astronomy in Heidelberg where she was the Emmy Noether Research Group Leader for the "Super-Earths and Life" group, and at the Center for Astrophysics | Harvard & Smithsonian in Cambridge, MA. She was appointed Lecturer in 2008 at Harvard University and 2011 at University of Heidelberg.

== Academic career ==
Kaltenegger earned a degree in astrophysics in 1999 from Karl Franzens University in Graz, Austria; a master's in physics and engineering in 2001 from the Graz University of Technology; and a doctorate in astrophysics in 2005 from Karl Franzens University. Her Ph.D. was awarded Sub auspiciis Praesidentis by the Austrian president.

Kaltenegger is known for her studies of the atmospheres of extrasolar planets, especially Earth-like ones and is a pioneer in the study of the Earth as an astronomical object evolving in time. She studied the change in the Earth's spectral fingerprint as a comparison with the evolutionary stages of Earthlike exoplanets to generate an "Alien ID Chart" – pointing out that as biology and geology change the Earth through the ages, its appearance to a telescope observing it from distant stars would also change. She also investigated the ability of future telescopes like the James Webb Space Telescope to detect evidence of life using spectral biomarkers (biosignatures) and generated the first spectra of Earth seen as a transiting exoplanet in 2009, concluding that it will be a hard problem for JWST and bigger future telescopes are needed to find signatures of life on many planets.

In 2009, Kaltenegger discussed how one can determine habitability for moons around giant planets coinciding with the suggestion of such a moon in the movie Avatar.

In 2010, Kaltenegger explored whether we could observe geological activity, that is very important for habitability, on exoplanets, finding that about 10 times Pinatubo eruptions could be detected around the closest exoplanets, showing us if other planets are similar to our own Earth. In 2011, she led a team to model the spectral fingerprint of Gliese 581 d, one of the first small Radial Velocity planets to be discovered in the habitable zone of its star.

In 2013, Kaltenegger was part of the team announcing the discovery of the first two potentially habitable Kepler planets, with radii smaller than 2 Earth radii in the habitable zone of their stars, Kepler 62e and Kepler 62f and investigated whether or not these planets could still be habitable and how their spectra would look like if they were water worlds.

In 2021, Kaltenegger and J. K. Faherty identified 1,715 stars (with likely related exoplanetary systems) within 326 light-years (100 parsecs) that have a favorable positional vantage point—in relation to the Earth Transit Zone (ETZ)—of detecting Earth as an exoplanet transiting the Sun since the beginnings of human civilization (about 5,000 years ago); an additional 319 stars are expected to arrive at this special vantage point in the next 5,000 years.

Kaltenegger served four years on the Executive Council of NASA's Exoplanet Exploration Program Analysis Group (Exo-PAG) and is part of the Transiting Exoplanet Survey Satellite (TESS) and FGS/NIRISS science team. Kaltenegger is the founder and current director of the Carl Sagan Institute at Cornell University.

== Honours ==
Asteroid 7734 Kaltenegger is named after Kaltenegger. In 2007 she was named America's Young Innovator in Arts and Science by Smithsonian Magazine and received the Paul Hertelendy Prize for Outstanding Young Scientist at the Harvard Smithsonian Center for Astrophysics. In 2012 she was named an EC Role Model for the Women in Research & Science Campaign of the EU and was awarded the Heinz Maier-Leibnitz-Preis in physics awarded annually to only six young researchers in all fields of science in Germany. In 2013 she was selected as PI for the Simons Origins of Life Initiative as well as PI for the Japanese Earth and Life Science Institute (ELIS). In 2014 she received the Christian-Doppler Prize of the city of Salzburg for Science and Innovations.
