= Journal of the Indian Academy of Wood Science =

- Discipline: Wood science, forest products, biomaterials
- Language: English
- Edited by: Krishna K. Pandey

Publication details
- History: 1973–present
- Publisher: Springer Science+Business Media on behalf of the Indian Academy of Wood Science
- Frequency: Bimonthly
- Open access: Hybrid
- Impact factor: 1.7 (2023)

Standard abbreviations
- ISO 4: J. Indian Acad. Wood Sci.

Indexing
- CODEN: JIAWAJ
- ISSN: 0972-172X (print); 0976-8432 (web)
- OCLC no.: 727034630

Links
- Journal homepage; Online archive

The Journal of the Indian Academy of Wood Science is a bimonthly peer-reviewed scientific journal and the official publication of the Indian Academy of Wood Science. It was established in 1973 and is published by Springer Science+Business Media.

The journal covers all aspects of wood science, including research on cellulose and derivative products. The editor-in-chief is Krishna K. Pandey (Institute of Wood Science and Technology).

== Abstracting and indexing ==
The journal is abstracted and indexed in the Emerging Sources Citation Index, Scopus, and ProQuest databases. According to the Journal Citation Reports, the journal has a 2025 impact factor of 1.7.

== See also ==
- Biomaterials
- Forest products
