= Forest Research Institute of Thessaloniki =

Public Forest Research Institute in Greece

- Ινστιτούτο Δασικών Ερευνών Θεσσαλονίκης
- Established: 1961
- Research type: Public
- Location: Thessaloniki, Greece
- Website: www.fri.gr

The Forest Research Institute of Thessaloniki (Greek: Ινστιτούτο Δασικών Ερευνών Θεσσαλονίκης) is a public research institution in Greece specializing in forest science, ecosystem management, and environmental conservation.

It is located in Thermi, outside the city of Thessaloniki, and operates under the supervision of the Hellenic Agricultural Organization – DEMETER (ΕΛΓΟ - Δήμητρα).

== History ==
The institute was founded in 1961 to support research related to forestry, forest ecosystems, and environmental protection in northern Greece.

The Forest Research Institute of Thessaloniki has helped in the development of forestry practices, as well as in the reforestation efforts, and for biodiversity conservation.

== Research areas ==
Forest Research Institute focuses on a broad range of topics, including:

- Forest ecology and biodiversity
- Silviculture and sustainable forest management
- Reforestation and afforestation techniques
- Climate change impacts on forests
- Forest fire ecology and prevention
- Soil science and forest hydrology
