= Hellenic Agricultural Academy =

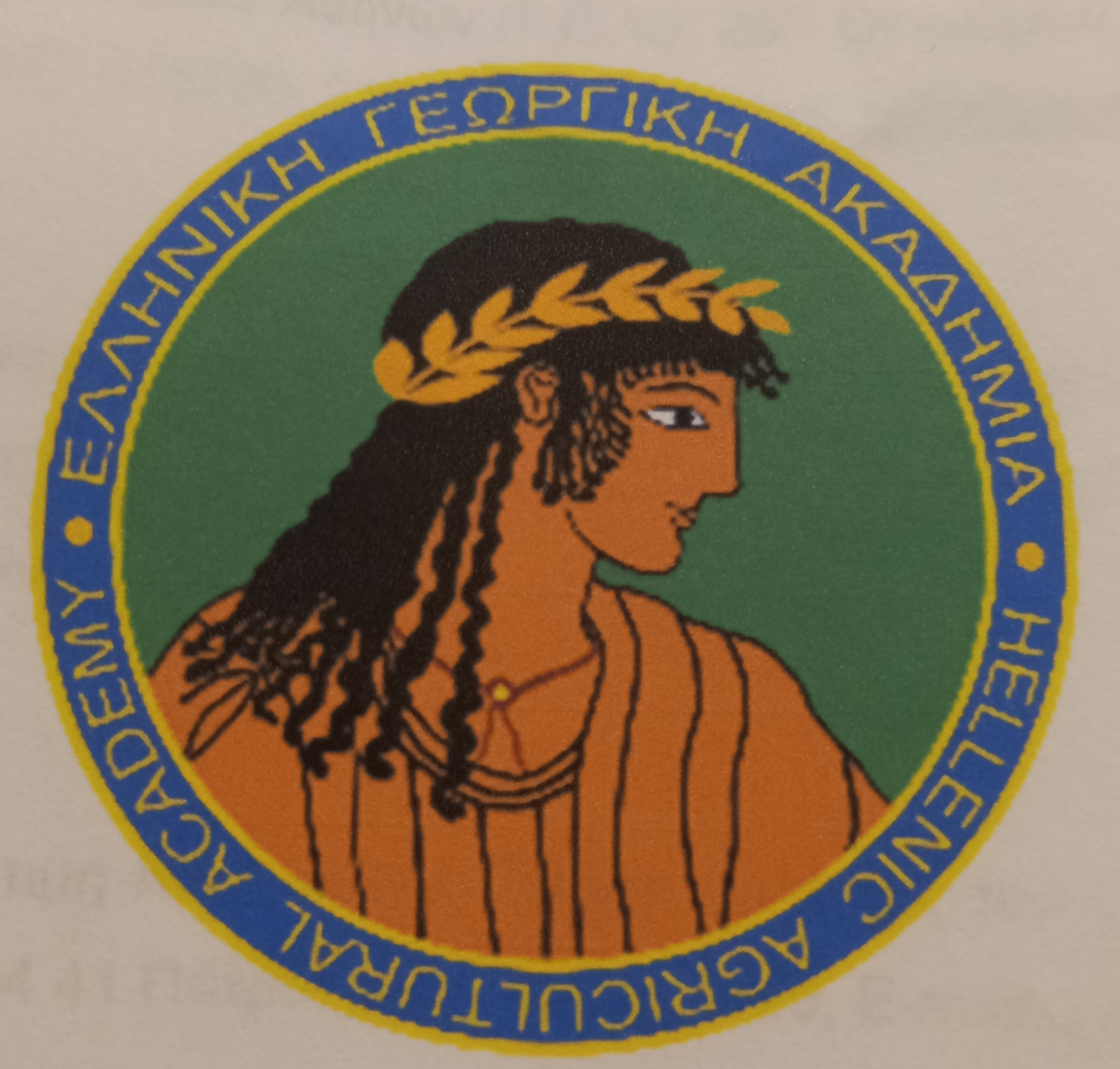
- Founded: 25 January 2000
- Headquarters: Iera Odos 75, GR-11855, Athens
- Official language: Greek
- Website: https://haga.gr/en/

The Hellenic Agricultural Academy, also known as HAA (Greek: Ελληνική Γεωργική Ακαδημία), is an independent, non-profit Greek scientific organization (academy) based in Athens at the Agricultural University of Athens.

It is active in the scientific fields of agronomy and forestry, biotechnology, veterinary medicine and animal science, food sciences and nutririon, ecology and natural environment, and agricultural economics.

== History ==
The Hellenic Agricultural Academy was founded in 2000 by a group of scientists representing a wide range of disciplines, including agricultural sciences, forestry, veterinary medicine, food technology, and environmental sciences.

Following its establishment, the academy joined the Union of European Academies for Sciences applied to Agriculture, Food and Nature (UEAA). Since 2001, it has been a full member of the UEAA, a pan-European network of academies that promotes scientific research and cooperation on issues related to agriculture, food, and the environment. The UEAA supports networking among scientists at the European level and the exchange of knowledge among its member states.

For the 2024–2026 term, President of the HAA is Dr. Sophia Efstratoglou, Emerita Professor at the Agricultural University of Athens, and Vice President is Dr. Georgios-Ioannis Nychas, Emeritus Professor at the Agricultural University of Athens.

== Core purpose and mission ==
According to its statute, the primary mission of the HAA includes the following objectives:

- The study and addressing of scientific, technical, economic, and social issues related to agriculture, food, forests, and the natural environment.
- The promotion of sustainable development and scientific knowledge in the agri-food sector.
- The organization of scientific conferences, lectures, seminars, and events to promote information exchange and collaboration among scientists and institutions.
- Cooperation with national and international bodies, including scientific institutions and organizations with related objectives.

The academy seeks to achieve these objectives through the support of research projects, the publication of scientific works, and participation in international scientific networks.

Members of the academy (Fellows) are elected from among Greek scientists with a recognized, yearlong contribution (research, administrative, or professional) in fields related to the academy's objectives. In addition, candidates should possess internationally recognised work in peer-reviewed scientific journals, that advances science and technology in at least one area of interest of the academy. Election follows a process of public open call, thorough academic evaluation, and nominal voting by all members of the General Assembly.

== Sections ==
According to its statute, the academy is structured into the following sections:

- Section of Plant Production
- Section of Animal Production
- Section of Veterinary
- Section of Food Science
- Section of Forestry, Forest Products and Forest Engineering
- Section of Natural Resources, Agricultural Engineering and Landscape Architecture
- Section of Biotechnology - Biology (with applications in Agriculture)
- Section of Ecology, Biodiversity and the Environment
- Section of Economic and Social Sciences applied in Agriculture
- Section of Miscellaneous Sciences (with emphasis on Agriculture)

== Organization and activities ==
The academy operates under an official statute, which defines different categories of membership, including full, honorary, and corresponding members, as well as procedures governing the scientific and administrative activities of the organization. A fixed number of positions and sections exists within the academy, covering a broad range of all of the agricultural sciences.

HAA organizes a wide range of academic lectures and events in cooperation with Greek universities and research institutions, with a goal of fostering communication and dialogue on contemporary scientific issues.
