= Institute of Wood Technology and Renewable Materials =

Institute of BOKU University in Austria

The logo of BOKU

The Institute of Wood Technology and Renewable Materials (German: Institut für Holztechnologie und Nachwachsende Rohstoffe) is a public research and teaching institute at the BOKU University in Vienna, Austria.

The institute conducts basic and applied research and provides higher education in the fields of wood science, wood technology and renewable materials. Its activities include the investigation of wood and wood-based materials, their properties and processing, as well as the development and application of renewable materials and technologies in several domains.

Primary mission of the institute is to contribute to research and higher education concerning the sustainable use of renewable resources. also in close cooperation with the industry and other foreign wood institutes.

== History ==
Wood science and education at BOKU University dates back to 1973, when the first wood science-related study programme was introduced at the university. The research work carried out at the institute, has expanded from traditional wood technics and technology to incorporate wood-based materials, renewable resources and sustainable material applications.

== Education ==
The institute contributes to teaching at BOKU University in subjects related to wood technology, wood materials and renewable resources, including several BSc, MSc and PhD programs.

== See also ==
- BOKU University
- Wood science
- Engineered wood
- Wood anatomy
- Renewable resource
