= Bund Deutscher Holzwirte =

Bund Deutscher Holzwirte e.V.
- Abbreviation: BDH
- Formation: 1950
- Purpose: Professional association
- Location: Hamburg, Germany
- Region served: Germany
- Chairman: Malte Jörn Krafft
- Website: www.holzwirte.com

Bund Deutscher Holzwirte (BDH) (English: Association of German Wood Scientists) is a professional and alumni association for graduates of the German degree course for Holzwirtschaft (English: Wood Science), founded in 1950.

== History ==
The BDH was founded on 22 July 1950 in Hamburg (Germany) by graduates of the degree program for Holzwirtschaft. This course of study was established in 1939 by the Reichsinstitut für ausländische und koloniale Forstwirtschaft (English: Reich Institute for Foreign and Colonial Forestry). As of 1946 the University of Hamburg continues the course.

== Purpose ==
The purpose of the BDH is 'to promote wood economy by exchanging professional experiences as well as maintaining personal contacts of the members, to support the professional development of the members and to inform about the degree program for Holzwirtschaft' (translated paragraph of the statutes).
