= Chimar Hellas =

Greek chemical company

Chimar Hellas S.A.
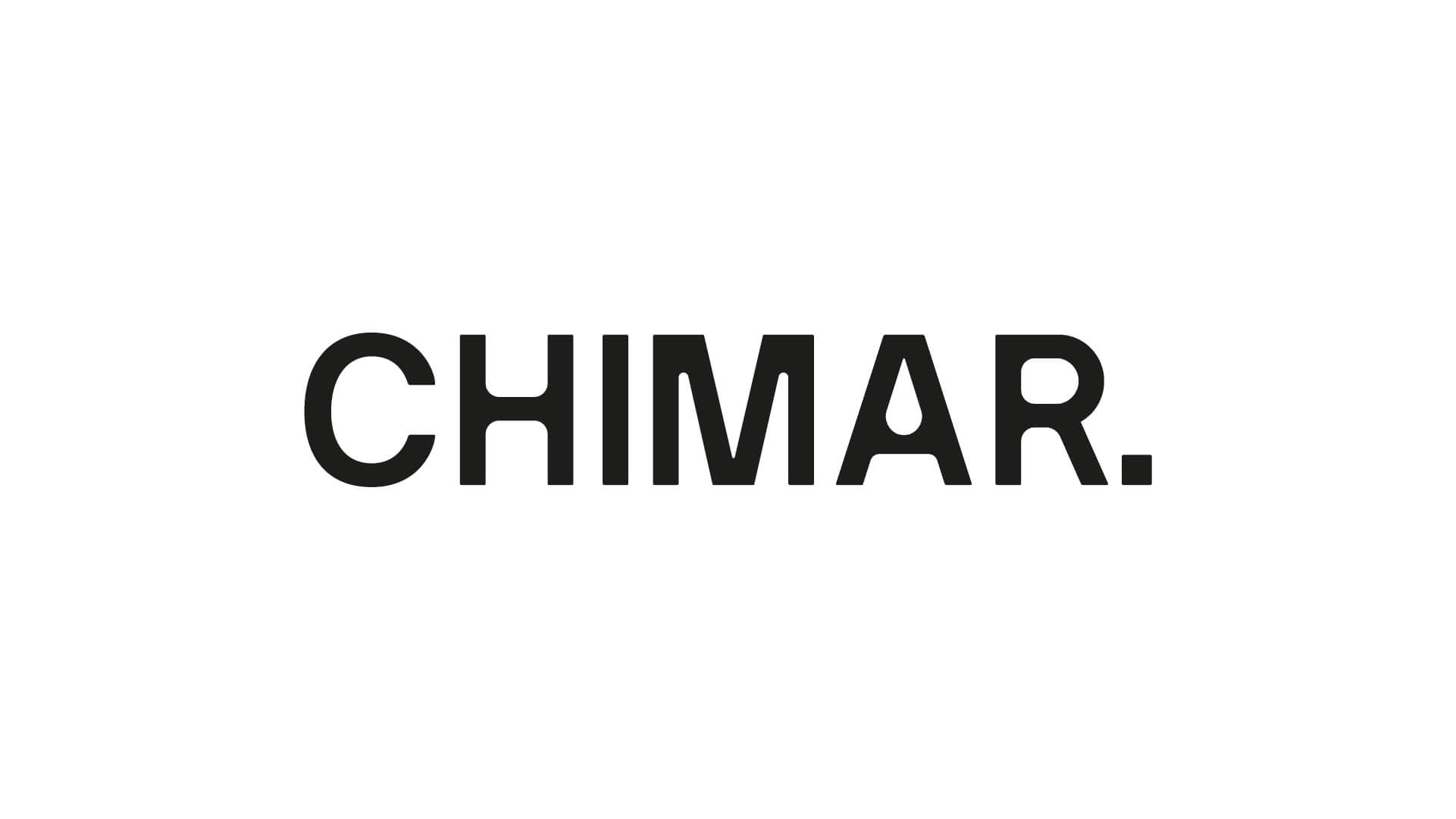
- Industry: Wood-based panels adhesives
- Founded: 20 February 1978; 48 years ago
- Founder: Effy Markessini, Andrew C. Markessini
- Headquarters: Thermi, Thessaloniki, Greece
- Area served: Europe, N. & S. America, Australia and Asia
- Key people: Dimitris Alexandropoulos, CEO; Charles Markessini, R&D director
- Products: Resin technology Additives; Technical support New products
- Number of employees: 53 (2024)
- Website: chimarhellas.com

Chimar Hellas S.A. is a Greek chemical company specializing in the research, development, and production of wood adhesives and chemical additives for the wood-based panel industry.

It was founded in 1978 under the name MARLIT (later known in the 90s known as ACM Wood Chemicals) by Greek chemist Effy Markessini and her husband, Andrew C. Markessini, which specializes in wood adhesive systems and related additives, providing also expertise and services as well as technical support for engineered wood products.

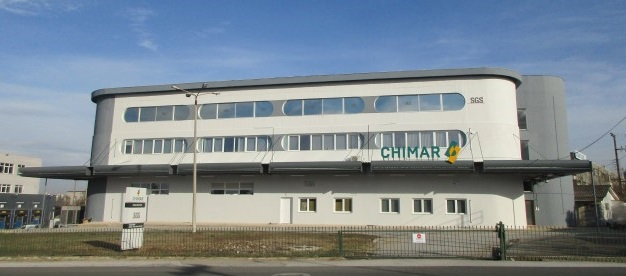
The research facilities of Chimar Hellas in Thermi, a suburb of Thessaloniki.

== History ==
In 1977, Andreas and Effy Markessini developed a patent for a new chemical product suitable for particleboards, resulting in lower costs for manufacturing plants and decrease in formaldehyde emissions. The invention was initially protected in Germany and later granted an international patent in forty countries.

In 1978, the precursor company of Chimar Hellas, named as MARLIT, was established. Over the years, additional patents for adhesives were developed and the company entered into collaboration with the German manufacturer, Bison Werke Bähre und Greten. New patents led to the application of novel chemical products, such as additives, catalysts, and hardeners.

In 1994, the company under its new name, Chimar Hellas, began developing technologies for the production of formaldehyde-based resins such as UF, MUF, and PF. Together with its subsidiaries MARLIT Ltd. and Adhesives Research Institute Ltd., the company laid the foundation for the ACM Wood Chemicals Plc corporate group. In 2002, Chimar Hellas fully absorbed ACM Wood Chemicals Plc.

== Activities ==
The company carries out industrial research and development and also provides competitive technology for making new adhesives and additives. It is also involved in the supply of equipment, turnkey construction, as well as the optimization of manufacturing plants for formaldehyde-based resins.

In 2013, Chimar Hellas S.A. received a key distinction in the European Business Awards for its activities.

The company's R&D department has participated in several research programs funded by the European Union, collaborating with international companies, wood product industries, and universities.

Chimar Hellas is currently directed by Effy Markessini's son, Charles Markessini (born 1979), who is a chemical engineer (BSc, MSc) and serves as the director of Research and Development, and Dimitris Alexandropoulos (born in 1957), a Greek senior chemical engineer, who is the CEO of the company.
