= Wood Material Science and Engineering =

Academic journal

- Discipline: Wood science
- Language: English
- Edited by: Dick Sandberg

Publication details
- History: 2006–present
- Publisher: Taylor & Francis
- Frequency: Bimonthly
- Impact factor: 1.9 (2025)

Standard abbreviations
- ISO 4: Wood Mater. Sci. Eng.

Indexing
- CODEN: WMSEAM
- ISSN: 1748-0280 (print); 1748-0272 (web)
- LCCN: 2006256050

Links
- Journal homepage; Online access; Online archive

Wood Material Science and Engineering is a bimonthly peer-reviewed scientific journal covering all aspects of wood sciences, including wood engineering, physics, chemistry, biology, and technology.

It is published by Taylor & Francis and the editor-in-chief is Dick Sandberg (Norwegian University of Science and Technology). The journal was established in 2006.

== Abstracting and indexing ==
The journal is abstracted and indexed in:

- CAB Abstracts
- Current Contents/Engineering, Computing & Technology
- EBSCO databases
- Ei Compendex
- Inspec
- ProQuest databases
- Science Citation Index Expanded
- Scopus

According to the Journal Citation Reports, the journal has a 2025 impact factor of 1.9.
