= Composite index (metrics) =

Measure of scientific research impact

The composite index or composite indicator (abbreviated as c-score) is a numerical indicator that evaluates the quality of a scientist's research publications, regardless of the scientific field in which they operates.

It was initially introduced in 2016, by the Greek-American metascience researcher John Ioannidis at Stanford University, with an improvement following in 2019.

The c-score is calculated by an algorithm that combines all scientific research fields and ranks research from the Scopus database across all research areas, even from those with lower citation density. This has allowed researchers to identify the top 2% of the world's most influential scientists, in a unified way across every scientific discipline.

The parameters that determine a researcher's c-score are:

- total number of citations received,
- Hirsch index for the citations received,
- Schreiber co-authorship adjusted Hm index for the citations received.
- number of citations for papers (as a single author),
- number of citations for papers (as a single or the first author) and also,
- number of citations for papers (as either a single, the first, or the last author)
