= International Academy of Wood Science =

The International Academy of Wood Science (IAWS) is an international academy and a non-profit assembly of wood scientists, recognizing all fields of wood science with their associated technological domains and securing a worldwide representation.

Since June 2026, the academy is represented by Ingo Burgert, a German-born Swiss wood scientist, who is presently the 20th elected president of the IAWS, while the present vice-president is Andreja Kutnar, from the University of Primorska, Slovenia.

== History ==
The academy was first established on June 2, 1966, at the Centre Technique du Bois in Paris.

The development and establishment of the International Academy of Wood Science involved many people, but the individual who decided to found a wood academy was Franz Gustav Kollmann, who had studied in the Wood Research (German: Holzforschung) department at the Technical University of Munich, Germany, and was then working in industry. He was also the first elected President of the academy in the years 1966–1972.

Since 1967, the official scientific journal of the IAWS is the journal of Wood Science and Technology.

== Objectives ==
The Academy aims to advance the field of wood science globally by fostering coordinated progress and enhancing its reputation. Basic priority of the Academy is to honor exceptional wood scientists as Fellows. This type of recognition simply acknowledge contributions to wood science and highlights the excellence in research and technology. Additionally, the Academy organizes several gatherings every year, which include scientific sessions and presentations.

Fellows of the International Academy of Wood Science (named as FIAWS) are wood experts who have been involved in wood-related research in various sub-areas of wood science and technology. Their election in the Academy is a mark of high scientific achievement. Current Fellows nominate some excellent candidates every year, and all of the current IAWS Fellows vote to select the new members.

Fellows of the IAWS are expected to:

- Support and advance cutting-edge wood science and technology.
- Share and present their research at both IAWS-hosted and other international or national scientific forums.
- Advocate for the relevance and impact of wood science to policymakers, industry leaders, media, and the public.
- Encourage the publication of member research in the Quarterly Bulletins.

== Executive committee ==
The executive committee of the IAWS consists of the following officers:

- President: Ingo Burgert, Institute for Building Materials, ETH Zurich, Switzerland
- Vice President: Andreja Kutnar, Department of Wood Science, University of Primorska, Slovenia
- Secretary: Rupert Wimmer, Natural Materials Technology, BOKU University, Vienna, Austria
- Treasurer: Robert Ross, Forest Products Laboratory, Madison, Wisconsin, USA
- Past President: Stavros Avramidis, Department of Wood Science, University of British Columbia, Canada
- Chair of the Academy Board: Katarina Čufar, Department of Wood Science and Technology, University of Ljubljana, Slovenia

== Distinguished members ==
- Alfred J. Stamm (1897–1985), member
- Erich Adler (1905–1985), member and recipient of Anselme Payen Award
- Josef Gierer (1919–), member and recipient of Anselme Payen Award
- Peter Koch (1920–1998), member
- Kyosti Vilho Sarkanen (1921–1990), member and recipient of Anselme Payen Award
- John F. Siau (1921–1996), member
- Walter Liese (1926–2023), member
- Chung-Yun Hse (1935–1921), member
- Edmone Roffael (1939–2021), member
- Roger M. Rowell (1939–), member
- Pieter Baas (1944–2024), member
- Raymond A. Young (1945–), member
- Gerd Wegener (1945–), member
- Antonio Pizzi (1946–), member
- Peter Niemz (1950–), member
- Alfred Teischinger (1954–), member
- John Ralph (1954–), member and recipient of: Anselme Payen Award, Marcus Wallenberg Prize
- Akira Isogai (1954–), member and recipient of: Anselme Payen Award, Honda Prize, Marcus Wallenberg Prize
- Geoffrey Daniel (1957–), member
- Callum A.S. Hill (1957–), member
- Philip D. Evans (1958–), member
- Rupert Wimmer (1960–), member
- Holger Militz (1960–), member, and recipient of: Schweighofer Prize, Marcus Wallenberg Prize
- Thomas Rosenau (1963–), member and recipient of Anselme Payen Award

== Publications ==
- Wood Science and Technology
- IAWS Bulletin
