= Spinning (polymers) =

Manufacturing of polymer fibres

Spinning is a manufacturing process for creating polymer fibers. It is a specialized form of extrusion that uses a spinneret to form multiple continuous filaments.

== Melt spinning ==
If the polymer is a thermoplastic then it can undergo melt spinning. The molten polymer is extruded through a spinneret composed of capillaries where the resulting filament is solidified by cooling. Nylon, olefin, polyester, saran, and sulfar are produced via this process.

=== Extrusion spinning ===
Pellets or granules of the solid polymer are fed into an extruder. The pellets are compressed, heated and melted by an extrusion screw, then fed to a spinning pump and into the spinneret.

=== Direct spinning ===
The direct spinning process avoids the stage of solid polymer pellets. The polymer melt is produced from the raw materials, and then from the polymer finisher directly pumped to the spinning mill. Direct spinning is mainly applied during production of polyester fibers and filaments and is dedicated to high production capacity (>100 ton/day).

== Solution spinning ==
If the melting point of the polymer is higher than its degradation temperature, the polymer must undergo solution spinning techniques for fiber formation. The polymer is first dissolved in a solvent, forming a spinning solution (sometimes called a "dope"). The spinning solution then undergoes dry, wet, dry-jet wet, gel, or electrospinning techniques.

=== Dry spinning ===
A spinning solution consisting of polymer and a volatile solvent is extruded through a spinneret into an evaporating chamber. A stream of hot air impinges on the jets of spinning solution emerging from the spinneret, evaporating the solvent, and solidifying the filaments. Solution blow spinning is a similar technique where polymer solution is sprayed directly onto a target to produce a nonwoven fiber mat.

=== Wet spinning ===
Wet spinning is the oldest of the five processes. The polymer is dissolved in a spinning solvent where it is extruded out through a spinneret submerged in a coagulation bath composed of nonsolvents. The coagulation bath causes the polymer to precipitate in fiber form. Acrylic, rayon, aramid, modacrylic, and spandex are produced via this process.

A variant of wet spinning is dry-jet wet spinning, where the spinning solution passes through an air-gap prior to being submerged into the coagulation bath. This method is used in Lyocell spinning of dissolved cellulose, and can lead to higher polymer orientation due to the higher stretchability of the spinning solution versus the precipitated fiber.

=== Gel spinning ===
Gel spinning, also known as semi-melt spinning, is used to obtain high strength or other special properties in the fibers. Instead of wet spinning, which relies on precipitation as the main mechanism for solidification, gel spinning relies on temperature-induced physical gelation as the primary method for solidification. The resulting gelled fiber is then swollen with the spinning solvent (similar to gelatin desserts) which keeps the polymer chains somewhat bound together, resisting relaxation which is prevalent in wet spinning. The high solvent retention allows for ultra-high drawing as with ultra high molecular weight polyethylene (UHMWPE) (e.g., Spectra^{®}) to produce fibers with a high degree of orientation, which increases fiber strength. The fibers are first cooled either with air or in a liquid bath to induce gelation, then the solvent is removed through ageing in a nonsolvent, or during the drawing stage. Some high strength polyethylene and polyacrylonitrile fibers are produced via this process.

=== Electrospinning ===
Electrospinning uses an electrical charge to draw very fine (typically on the micro or nano scale) fibres from a liquid - either a polymer solution or a polymer melt. Electrospinning shares characteristics of both electrospraying and conventional solution dry spinning of fibers. The process does not require the use of coagulation chemistry or high temperatures to produce solid threads from solution. This makes the process particularly suited to the production of fibers using large and complex molecules. Melt electrospinning is also practiced; this method ensures that no solvent can be carried over into the final product.

== Post-spin processes ==
=== Drawing ===
Finally, the fibers are drawn to increase strength and orientation. This may be done while the polymer is still solidifying or after it has completely cooled.

== See also ==
- Spinneret (polymers)
