= Anselme Payen Award =

The Anselme Payen Award is an annual prize named in honor of Anselme Payen, the French scientist who discovered cellulose, and was a pioneer in the chemistry of both cellulose and lignin.

In 1838, he discovered that treating successively wood with nitric acid and an alkaline solution yielded a major insoluble residue that he called "cellulose", while dissolved incrustants were later called "lignin" by Frank Schulze. He was the first to attempt separation of wood into its component parts. After treating different woods with nitric acid he obtained a fibrous substance common to all which he also found in cotton and other plants. His analysis revealed the chemical formula of the substance to be C_{6}H_{10}O_{5}.

He reported the discovery and the first results of this classic work in 1838 in Comptes Rendus. The name "cellulose" was coined by him, and this was introduced into the scientific literature next year, in 1839.

Anselme Payen Award Recipients
The Anselme Payen Award, which includes a medal and an honorarium given by the American Chemical Society's Cellulose and Renewable Materials Division, to honor and encourage "outstanding professional contributions to the science and chemical technology of cellulose and its allied products".
The Anselme Payen Award is an international award and any scientist conducting cellulose and cellulose related research is eligible for nomination. Selection of the awardee is based upon an evaluation of the nomination packages submitted on behalf of potential awardees. These documents are individually ranked by a panel of nine judges who are appointed by the current Chair-Elect and are unknown to each other. Three judges rotate off the panel each year. The identity of all members is known only to the Chair of the awards committee who compiles the results. After the awardee accepts, the Chair of the Awards Committee announces the winner at the next Spring ACS meeting. The awardee for that year is honored at the following Spring ACS meeting at a Symposium and Banquet. The award bears the year the winner was announced. It is presented the following year to allow time for organization of the Symposium and Banquet.

== Recipients ==
| Year | Awardee | Institution |
|---|---|---|
| 1962 | Louis Elsberg Wise | The Institute of Paper Chemistry |
| 1963 | Clifford Burroughs Purves | McGill University |
| 1964 | Harold Morton Spurlin | Hercules |
| 1965 | Carl Johan Malm | Eastman Kodak |
| 1966 | Wayne A. Sisson | American Viscose |
| 1967 | Roy L. Whistler | Purdue University |
| 1968 | Alfred J. Stamm | USDA Forest Products Lab |
| 1969 | Stanley Mason | McGill University |
| 1970 | Wilson A. Reeves | USDA, ARS, Southern Regional Research Center |
| 1971 | Tore E. Timell | SUNY College of Environmental Science and Forestry |
| 1972 | Conrad Schuerch | SUNY College of Environmental Science and Forestry |
| 1973 | D. A. I. Goring | McGill University |
| 1974 | Vivian Thomas Stannett | North Carolina State University |
| 1975 | J. K. N. Jones | Queens University |
| 1976 | Robert H. Marchessault | University of Montreal |
| 1977 | W. Kyle Ward, Jr. | The Institute of Paper Chemistry |
| 1978 | W. Howard Rapson | University of Toronto |
| 1979 | Kyosti V. Sarkanen | University of Washington |
| 1980 | Olof Samuelson | Chalmers University of Technology |
| 1981 | Stanley P. Rowland | USDA, ARS, Southern Regional Research Center |
| 1982 | Erich Adler | Chalmers University of Technology |
| 1983 | Reginald D. Preston | Leeds University |
| 1984 | Jett C. Arthur, Jr. | USDA, ARS, Southern Regional Research Center |
| 1985 | Orlando A. Battista | The O. A. Battista Research Institute |
| 1986 | R. Malcolm Brown, Jr. | The University of Texas at Austin |
| 1987 | Takayoshi Higuchi | Kyoto University |
| 1988 | Bengt Ranby | Royal Institute of Technology |
| 1989 | Anatole Sarko | SUNY College of Environmental Science and Forestry |
| 1990 | Junzo Nakano | University of Tokyo |
| 1991 | Henri Chanzy | CERMAV, Grenoble |
| 1992 | Josef Gierer | KTH Royal Institute of Technology |
| 1993 | Derek Gray | Paprican, McGill University |
| 1994 | Geoffrey N. Richards | University of Montana |
| 1995 | Josef Gratzl | North Carolina State University |
| 1996 | S. Haig Zeronian | University of California, Davis |
| 1997 | Joseph L. McCarthy | University of Washington |
| 1998 | Rajai H. Atalla | USDA Forest Products Laboratory |
| 1999 | John Blackwell Case | Western Reserve University |
| 2000 | Wolfgang G. Glasser | Virginia Tech |
| 2001 | Liisa Viikari | VTT Biotechnology |
| 2002 | R. St. John Manley | McGill University |
| 2003 | Deborah P. Delmer | The Rockefeller Foundation |
| 2004 | Dieter Klemm | Friedrich Schiller University Jena |
| 2005 | Peter Zugenmaier | Clausthal University of Technology |
| 2006 | Charles Buchanan | Eastman Chemical Company |
| 2007 | Fumitaka Horii | Kyoto University |
| 2008 | Fumiaki Nakatsubo | Kyoto University |
| 2009 | Alfred D. French | USDA, ARS, Southern Regional Research Center |
| 2010 | Thomas Heinze | Friedrich Schiller University of Jena |
| 2011 | Lina Zhang | Wuhan University |
| 2012 | Hans-Peter Fink | Fraunhofer Institute for Applied Polymer Research |
| 2013 | John Ralph | University of Wisconsin-Madison |
| 2014 | Thomas Rosenau | University of Natural Resources and Life Sciences, Vienna |
| 2015 | Akira Isogai | University of Tokyo |
| 2016 | Kevin Edgar | Virginia Tech |
| 2017 | Junji Sugiyama | Kyoto University |
| 2018 | Orlando Rojas | Aalto University |
| 2019 | Ann-Christine Albertsson | KTH Royal Institute of Technology |
| 2020 | Run-Cang Sun | Dalian Polytechnic University |
| 2021 | Yoshiharu Nishiyama | CNRS and Grenoble Alpes University |
| 2022 | Christoph Weder | Adolphe Merkle Institute and University of Fribourg |
| 2023 | Lars Berglund | KTH Royal Institute of Technology |
| 2024 | Lars Wågberg | KTH Royal Institute of Technology |
| 2025 | Liangbing Hu | Yale University |
| 2026 | Antje Potthast | University of Natural Resources and Life Sciences, Vienna |
