= Ann-Christine =

Ann-Christine is a feminine given name.

== People with the given name ==
- Ann-Christine Albertsson (born 1945), Swedish chemist
- Ann-Christine Bärnsten (born 1957), Swedish singer and writer
- Ann-Christine Hagberg (born 1948), Swedish swimmer
- Ann-Christine Nyström (1944–2022), Finnish singer
- Ann-Christine From Utterstedt (born 1972), Swedish politician
