= Deborah Delmer =

American plant pathologist

- Education: Indiana University Bloomington, University of California, San Diego.
- Awards: ASPB Leadership in Science Public Service Award, Anselme Payen Award
- Scientific career
- Fields: Plant pathology
- Workplaces: University of Colorado, Michigan State University, Hebrew University of Jerusalem, University of California, Davis, Rockefeller Foundation

Deborah Pierson Delmer is an American plant pathologist, and professor emeritus at the University of California, Davis. She was one of the first scientists to discover the enzymes and biochemical mechanisms for tryptophan synthesis.

Delmer became president of the American Society of Plant Biologists (ASPB) as of 1999. She was awarded the 2011 ASPB Leadership in Science Public Service Award and the 2003 Anselme Payen Award.

== Career ==
Delmer earned a bachelor's degree in biochemistry with departmental honors at Indiana University Bloomington in 1963. Later, she attended the University of California, San Diego, where she identified the pathway of tryptophan biosynthesis in plants, an area others had not studied, using Nicotiana tabacum as a model. She received her Ph.D. in cellular biology in 1968.

Delmer then did postdoctoral work with Peter Albersheim at the University of Colorado. She successfully purified the enzyme sucrose synthase and studied its role in synthesizing and degrading sucrose. She also did postdoctoral work at UCSD with biologist Stanley Eli Mills.

In 1974, Delmer became a professor at the Plant Research Laboratory of Michigan State University in East Lansing, Michigan. She began studying the mechanisms by which plants polymerize glucose molecules and synthesize cellulose for their cell walls, using cotton fiber as a model system. An important discovery demonstrated that both plants and animals use lipids as an intermediate step in protein glycosylation.

As of 1987, Delmer accepted a faculty position at the Hebrew University of Jerusalem. Using a combination of approaches from molecular biology and genetics, Delmer and her collaborators developed a cDNA library and were the first to identify a plant gene involved in the synthesis of cellulose.

As of 1997, Delmer returned to the United States, where she became chair of the Section of Plant Biology at the University of California, Davis. One of her research experiments there determined that sterylglucoside is a primer for the initiation of cellulose synthesis and the creation of a new cellulose chain.

In 2002, Delmer became a Director of the Rockefeller Foundation, where her work focused primarily on agricultural development in Africa. She has emphasized the need for plant biology to become a translational science and encouraged scientists to address in-the-field problems faced by farmers, such as falling rates of crop production under conditions of stress and low inputs.

Delmer sits on the board of The American Chestnut Foundation. She served as the editor-in-chief of the Annual Review of Plant Biology from 2002–2004.
