= Richard Waring (disambiguation) =

Richard Waring (1911–1993) was an American actor.

Richard Waring may also refer to:

- Richard Waring (writer) (1925–1994), British television scriptwriter
- Richard H. Waring (born 1935), American academic
