= Antoine Kremer =

French forest geneticist

Antoine Kremer is a French forest geneticist and researcher. Since 2018, he has been Research Director Emeritus at UMR BIOGECO, a joint research unit of INRAE and the University of Bordeaux. His research focuses on forest genetics, evolutionary biology, genetic diversity and adaptation in forest trees, particularly European oaks. He is the recipient of Marcus Wallenberg Prize and appointed Chevalier of the Legion of Honour.

== Education and academic career ==
Kremer graduated as a forestry engineer from the École Nationale des Ingénieurs des Techniques Forestières in 1976. He subsequently completed a doctorate in quantitative genetics at the University of Paris-Sud, Orsay in 1992, and obtained an habilitation à diriger des recherches in population genetics from the same university (1995).

Kremer joined INRA in Bordeaux as a research assistant in 1977 and became a research scientist in 1982. In 1988, he was appointed research director at INRA. He later became research director emeritus at the BIOGECO joint research unit, a research unit operated by INRAE and the University of Bordeaux.

He directed the Institut Français de la Biodiversité (IFB) in Paris, serving as its first director from 1999 to 2000.

In 2003, Kremer became director of BIOGECO, which had been established through the merger of several INRA research teams with a team from the University of Bordeaux. The unit combined research in genetics, ecology and evolutionary biology to study the mechanisms underlying biological diversity in forest ecosystems.

Kremer also held research positions outside France, including a visiting researcher position at the USDA Forest Service laboratory in Rhinelander, Wisconsin, in the early 1980s. His subsequent work involved research networks and collaborations across Europe, North America and Asia.

Kremer was instrumental in establishing EVOLTREE, a European research network integrating genetics, genomics, ecology and evolutionary biology in the study of forest trees. Launched in 2006 as an EU-funded Network of Excellence under the Sixth Framework Programme, EVOLTREE continued after the end of EU funding as a member-supported European research network. Kremer served as its coordinator from 2006 to 2020.

In 2011, he became co-director of the COTE research cluster. He has also held advisory and scientific positions with international research organizations and programmes concerned with forest genetics and genomics.

== Research ==
Kremer's research has focused on the genetic diversity, evolution and adaptation of forest trees, particularly European oaks. His work combines population genetics, quantitative genetics, evolutionary biology and genomics to study genetic variation, gene flow, hybridization and adaptation to environmental change.

His early research examined quantitative genetics in maritime pine (Pinus pinaster), including selection and juvenile–adult correlations for growth traits. From the 1980s, he focused on European oak populations and their evolutionary history. Using genetic markers, including chloroplast DNA, Kremer and his collaborators investigated the postglacial recolonization of Europe by oaks, tracing geographic origins and migration routes.

This work contributed to the European FAIROAK project, which combined genetic, historical and modelling approaches to reconstruct the evolutionary history and distribution of European oak populations.

A major strand of Kremer's research has examined the relationship between genetic differentiation and adaptation. His studies have investigated the effects of natural selection, gene flow, hybridization and environmental variation on genetic and phenotypic differences among oak populations, including functional and reproductive traits and local adaptation to climate. This research examined why phenotypic differences among populations for polygenic traits do not match with genetic differences.

Kremer has studied the genetic basis of responses to environmental change, combining population-genetic and genomic approaches with ecological and physiological measurements to investigate whether evolutionary change can occur rapidly enough to affect long-lived trees.

His research has contributed to the study of microevolution of European white oaks using genomic tools. He participated in the construction of the first genetic linkage map in oaks in 1998 and in the sequencing of the oak genome, published in Nature Plants in 2018. Studies of the sessile–pedunculate oak species pair have examined how hybridization and gene introgression contributed to adaptation to colder climates during postglacial recolonization.

Through the European Research Council-funded TREEPEACE project, From Holocene to Anthropocene: The Pace of Microevolution in Trees, Kremer investigated evolutionary change in long-lived trees, particularly sessile oak (Quercus petraea). The project combined population genetics, genomics, ecology and ecophysiology to compare evolutionary changes across the Holocene, the period following the Little Ice Age and more recent environmental change. His research has indicated that evolutionary change in trees can occur on relatively short timescales and has highlighted the genetic resilience of tree populations to environmental change.

In a 2020 review with Andrew L. Hipp in New Phytologist, Kremer examined the evolutionary history and genetic diversity of oaks, including the roles of hybridization, gene flow and adaptation in the diversification and success of the genus.

Kremer has also held editorial and scientific advisory roles, including with Tree Genetics & Genomes, Conservation Genetics, Forest Genetics and Annals of Forest Science.

== Awards ==
- 1995: Scientific Achievement Award, International Union of Forest Research Organizations (IUFRO).
- 2003:European Forest Research Award.
- 2006:Marcus Wallenberg Prize
- 2007:Appointed Chevalier of the Legion of Honour.
- 2011:INRA Agricultural Research Laureate Award.
- 2014: Member of the Royal Academy of Engineering (Spain).
- 2015:Special Service Award, International Oak Society.
- 2016:Awarded an honorary doctorate by the Polytechnic University of Madrid
- 2022:Elected a member of the French Academy of Agriculture.
