= Marcus Wallenberg Prize =

- Awarded for: Outstanding contributions in forestry
- Presented by: Selection Committee of international eminent forestry researchers
- First award: 1981; 45 years ago
- No. of prize winners: 40 Prizes to 70 Laureates as of 2024
- Website: http://mwp.org

The Marcus Wallenberg Prize is the highest award in the field of forestry.

Established in 1981, the award is modeled on the Nobel Prize, and colloquially called the "Nobel Prize for Forestry". The award is named after the Swedish Industrialist Marcus Wallenberg Jr. who was managing director and subsequently chairman of Stockholms Enskilda Bank and later chairman and honorary chairman of Skandinaviska Enskilda Banken, as well as chairman and honorary chairman of a number of Swedish and international organisations and companies. The Marcus Wallenberg Prize was instituted by Stora Kopparbergs Bergslags AB at its annual meeting in 1980 to commemorate the services rendered by Dr. Marcus Wallenberg during his long term as member and chairman of the board of directors.

Every year a selection committee decides on the recipient from nominations received from academics and research organisations. The award is awarded in the autumn of each year in Stockholm, Sweden, at a symposium consisting of lectures from the recipient and invited speakers. The 2020 Award ceremony was postponed due to the COVID-19 pandemic.

== Recipients ==
Name	Country	Year
Harry Hutchinson Holton	Canada	1981
Ricardo O Foschi	Canada	1982
Bruno Andersson, Egon Höglund, Bertil Johansson and Bengt Thöresson	Sweden	1983
Leopoldo G Brandão, Edgard Campinhos Jr, Ney M Dos Santos and Yara K Ikemori	Brazil	1984
Karl-Erik Eriksson and T. Kent Kirk	Sweden and USA	1985
Johan Gullichsen	Finland	1986
Derek Barnes and Mark T. Churchland	Canada	1987
Bernhard Ulrich	Germany	1988
Torsten Ingestad	Sweden	1989
Donald H. Marx	USA	1991
Nils Hartler and Ants Teder	Sweden	1993
Gene Namkoong	Canada	1994
Lennart Eriksson, Gerdt Fladda and Thorulf Pettersson	Sweden	1995
Erkki Tomppo	Finland	1997
Keith Miles and Donald May	Canada	1998
Pekka Eskelinen, Raimo Virta and Vesa Vuorinen	Finland	1999
Robert H. Leicester	Australia	2000
Robert Evans	Australia	2001
Melvin Tyree	USA	2002
Johanna Buchert, Maija Tenkanen, Tapani Vuorinen and Anita Teleman	Finland and Sweden	2003
Paul Olof Meinander	Finland	2004
Tom Kjelgaard, Katarina Magnusson and Ulf Ringdahl	Sweden	2005
Antoine Kremer	France	2006
Ove Nilsson	Sweden	2007
Bjarne Holmbom and Christer Eckerman	Finland	2008
Jouni Ikäheimo, Vesa Kajander and Bengt Welin	Finland	2009
Hans Joachim Blass	Germany	2010
Erik Næsset	Norway	2011
Mika Viljanmaa	Finland	2012
Derek Gray	Canada	2013
Magnus Berggren	Sweden	2014
Akira Isogai, Tsuguyuki Saito and Yoshiharu Nishiyama	Japan and France	2015
Alexander Katsevich and Federico Giudiceandrea	USA and Italy	2016
Ronald R. Sederoff	USA	2017
Torgny Näsholm	Sweden	2018
Gerhard Schickhofer	Austria	2019
Joseph J Landsberg, Richard H. Waring and Nicholas Coops	Australia, USA and Canada	2020
Ilkka Kilpeläinen and Herbert Sixta	Finland and Austria	2022
Darius M. Adams, Joseph Buongiorno and Richard Haynes	USA	2023
John Ralph and Wout Boerjan	USA and Belgium	2024
Gerald Tuskan	USA	2025
Holger Militz	Germany	2026
