= Vivian Stannett =

Vivian Thomas Stannett (September 1, 1917 – October 1, 2002), Camille Dreyfus Professor Emeritus of Chemical Engineering and dean emeritus of the graduate school at North Carolina State University, was an English American chemist known for his contributions to the field of polymer science. In 1981 he received North Carolina's top science honor, the North Carolina Science Award and gold medal, and in 1995 he was elected to the National Academy of Engineering, an organization of the United States National Academies, for advancements in transport processes and radiation chemistry in polymers.

He earned international recognition as a polymer scientist and engineer by using high-energy radiation to synthesize and modify polymers via degradation, cross-linking, and grafting. His work in applying membrane science contributed to the development of flame-resistant textiles, plastic bottles that prevent soft drinks from going flat, and super-absorbent paper towels and diapers. In addition, he researched chemical modifications of cellulose and investigated the application of polymers to textiles, pulp, and paper.

== Biography ==
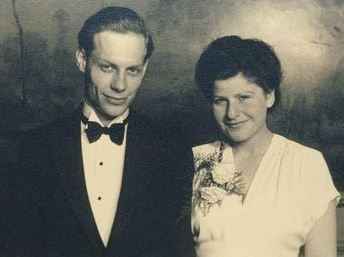
Vivian Stannett with his wife, Flora Susanne Sulzbacher

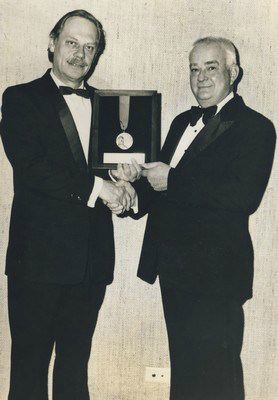
Vivian Stannett receiving an award

=== Early life ===
Vivian was born on September 1, 1917, in Langley, England, to Ernest and Dorothy Grace (Rustell) Stannett. He was raised in Stoke Poges, Buckinghamshire, England. His father was a dairy farmer and the proprietor of Berry Farm, Vivian's childhood home. Vivian showed interest in chemistry at an early age and conducted experiments in an abandoned railway car on the family property.

=== World War II ===
In 1936, Vivian enrolled in London Polytechnic to study chemistry and graduated with a B.S. in 1939. Afterwards, from 1939 to 1947, he worked for the British government at a cellulose-acetate film plant of the British Celansese Corporation whose products had military applications such as gas masks. In 1941, he was moved to Woolwich Arsenal where he worked on detonator inspection and research at the army laboratories. The arsenal lab was damaged by bombs and eventually destroyed by a V-2 rocket; Vivian was transferred to Liverpool, the site of a large ordnance plant and laboratories.

On May 30, 1946, Vivian married Flora Susanne Sulzbacher of Nuremberg, Germany who graduated with a degree in textile chemistry from Queen's University in Belfast, Northern Ireland.

=== Professional life ===
After World War II, Vivian began his graduate studies in 1947 under Professor Herman Francis Mark at the Polytechnic Institute in Brooklyn (now Polytechnic Institute of New York University). Three years later, in 1950, he received his Ph.D. in physical chemistry.

In 1951, Vivian became a research associate at the Mellon Institute of Industrial Research (now Carnegie Mellon University) in Pittsburgh, Pennsylvania and accepted a position as a research chemist at Koppers. His United States citizenship was granted in 1957.

In 1952, Vivian accepted a position at the College of Forestry in Syracuse, New York as an assistant professor in forest chemistry. In 1957, he became a full professor. In 1958, during a sabbatical, he partnered with Professors Adolphe Chapiro and Michel Magat at the University of Paris who worked in the field radiation grafting and radiation chemistry of polymers.

In 1961, Vivian was appointed to associate director of the Camille-Dreyfus Laboratory for Polymer Research, established by a grant from the Camille and Henry Dreyfus Foundation, at the Research Triangle Institute in North Carolina. There, he became an adjunct professor of chemistry at Duke University and North Carolina State University. In 1967 he became a full-time professor in the department of chemical engineering at NCSU and later became named Camille Dreyfus Professor. Vivian served as vice provost and dean of NCSU's graduate school from 1975 to 1982 and helped establish the nation's first doctoral program in textile chemistry. From 1982 to 1984 he worked in London as liaison scientist for the Office of Naval Research, Europe. He retired in 1988 upon reaching the mandatory retirement age of 70 but worked part-time at the Research Triangle Institute and continued to work with graduate students until 1992.

=== Awards and honors ===
Vivian Stannett published over 400 papers and reviews on polymer science and technology. He served on the editorial board of 7 academic journals and was chairman for the Gordon Conferences on Chemistry and Physics of Paper (1967), chairman of the North Carolina Section of the American Chemical Society (1970), chairman for the Gordon Conferences on Polymers (1972), chairman of the American Chemical Society Division of Polymer Chemistry (1977), and general secretary of the Macromolecular Secretariat (1979).

Vivian was a fellow of the Royal Institute of Chemistry (1948), the New York Academy of Sciences (1960), the Technical Association of the Pulp and Paper Industry (1968), and the Royal Society of Chemistry (1980). He received the Silver Medal from the Technical Association of the Pulp and Paper Industry (1967), the Borden Award from the American Chemical Society (1974), the American Chemical Society Anselm Payen Award (1974), the International Award and Gold Medal of the Society of Plastics Engineers (1978), the NCSU Alcoa Foundation Distinguished Research Award (1981), the North Carolina Science Award and Gold Medal (1981), the American Chemical Society of North Carolina Distinguished Speaker Award (1983), the University of North Carolina Board of Governors' O. Max Gardner Award (1984), the American Chemical Society Award for Polymer Chemistry (1987), the North Carolina Distinguished Chemistry Award from the North Carolina Institute of Chemists (1989), the Alexander Quarles Holladay Medal from NCSU (1992), and the Olney Medal of the American Association of Textile Chemists and Colorists (1995). In 1990 he was named an Honorary Member of the Society of Fiber Science and Technology of Japan.

The Vivian T. Stannett Memorial Fund was created in his memory and provides financial assistance to graduate students in North Carolina State University's Department of Chemical and Biomolecular Engineering.
