= Zhang Lina =

Chinese physical chemist (1940–2020)

- 张俐娜
- Born: 14 August 1940; Guangze County, Fujian
- Died: 17 October 2020 (aged 80); Wuhan, Hubei
- Citizenship: China
- Awards: Anselme Payen Award
- Scientific career
- Institutions: Wuhan University
- Website: http://www.whu.edu.cn/info/1183/3171.htm

Zhang Lina (Chinese: 张俐娜; pinyin: Zhāng Lìnà; 14 August 1940 – 17 October 2020) was a Chinese physical chemist specializing in polymer science. She focused on high-performance mechanisms of biomass based materials such as soy protein, alginate and cellulose; all are a part of green chemistry. She was a dedicated educator, training 118 postgraduate and doctoral students. Zhang was elected as an academician of the Chinese Academy of Sciences, becoming the first woman from Wuhan University to receive this honor.

== Scientific career ==
Zhang Lina graduated from Wuhan University in 1963 and later became a distinguished professor at the School of Chemistry and Molecular Sciences of Wuhan University. Zhang studied in Japan through a Japan Society for the Promotion of Science scholarship at Osaka University in 1984–1986. There she started work on green chemistry by studying polysaccharide solutions.

Zhang founded the Natural Polymer and Polymer Physics Research Group at Wuhan University in 1993. Zhang's research focused on fundamental and applied research of biomass resources and natural macromolecular material science. She solved the problem of the poorest soluble biomass macromolecule, cellulose. Cellulose is a rich renewable resource from plants, but the use of traditional manufacturing technology which used CS_{2}/NaOH harms sustainable development of the environment. In 2000, sponsored by the Natural Science Foundation of China, Zhang broke through the traditional method of polymer dissolution by heating and successfully dissolved cellulose and chitin using an NaOH/urea solution at low temperature. Zhang's technology reduces the generation of white pollution, and the materials generated using Zhang's technology can be completely degraded within a month. This technology makes the recycling of biomass waste possible and renewable resources can be better utilized. Zhang pioneered new technology for low-temperature dissolution of polymers.

Throughout her career, Zhang published over 530 papers in international journals and was granted nearly 100 patents. Her work is highly influential in the field of "Self-healing hydrogels" and "Regenerated cellulose," with her top-cited paper, Rapid dissolution of cellulose in LiOH/urea and NaOH/urea aqueous solutions, receiving over 1,200 citations.

== Research and Innovation ==
Zhang's most significant contribution was the development of a "green" method to dissolve cellulose. Unlike traditional methods that use high heat and toxic chemicals (the Viscose process), Zhang discovered that a pre-cooled aqueous solution of LiOH/urea or NaOH/urea could rapidly dissolve cellulose at low temperatures (around -12 °C). This discovery is considered a milestone in polymer science because it allows for the creation of biodegradable films and fibers without environmental pollution.

== Achievements ==
Zhang has published 530 papers, authored 16 books, and been granted nearly 100 domestic and international patents.

In 2006, Zhang wrote book Natural polymer modified materials and applications.

In 2007, Zhang wrote book Natural Polymer Science and Materials.

In 2011, Zhang wrote book Environmentally friendly materials based on biomass.

In 2015, Zhang wrote book Cellulose Science and Materials.

In 2011, she became the first Chinese scientist to receive the Anselme Payen Award, the highest international honor in the field of cellulose and renewable materials, awarded by the American Chemical Society (ACS). The award included a bronze medal and a $3,000 honorarium.

In 2011, she was elected as an academician of the Chinese Academy of Sciences, becoming the first woman from Wuhan University to receive this honor.

Zhang served on the editorial boards of Cellulose, the Journal of Biobased Materials and Bioenergy, and Acta Polymerica Sinica.
