= Siegfried Fink (forest ecologist) =

German Forest ecologist

Siegfried Fink (born 1956, died 2023) was a German Forest ecologist with the main field of Forest botanic. Fink was professor forest-botanic at the Universität Freiburg im Breisgau, Germany.

Finks research group took care of the Forest-botanic-garden of Freiburg. He and his were working on methods of forest botanic research (microskopy and microbiology). The group was doing research on matrixes of wood-decomposing fungi at different kind of woods in vivo an in vitro and other questions concerning the relation of fungus and trees.

He is the inventor of transparent wood.

== Publications ==
- Siegfried Fink (1999): Pathological and Regenerative Plant Anatomy. Buch. GEBRÜDER BORNTRAEGER, ISBN 978-3-443-14027-4
- Mark Schubert, Siegfried Fink (2008): Evaluation of Trichoderma spp. as a biocontrol agent against wood decay fungi in urban trees. Biological control 45.1 (2008): 111–123.
- Siegfried Fink (2009): Hazard tree identification by visual tree assessment (VTA): Scientifically solid and practically approved. Arboricultural Journal 32.3 (2009): 139–155.
- Giuliana Deflorio, Siegfried Fink et al. (2008): Detection of incipient decay in tree stems with sonic tomography after wounding and fungal inoculation."Wood Science and Technology 42.2 (2008): 117–132.
- Siegfried Fink (1992): Transparent wood–a new approach in the functional study of wood structure. Holzforschung Nr. 46
