= Richard H. Waring =

American scientist (born 1935)

Richard Harvey Waring (born 17 May, 1935), is an American scientist, educator, and author. Born in Chicago, Illinois, he completed his BSc and MSc at the University of Minnesota, and his Ph.D. at the University of California, Berkeley. His research focuses on the physiological ecology of trees, their health and distribution in response to climatic variation across regions. He has made significant contributions to the understanding of the physiology of stressed trees, the ecology of forests, and the functioning of vegetation across regions. As a co-developer of the forest growth model 3-PG (Physiological Processes Predicting Growth), he won the 2020 Marcus Wallenberg Prize together with Joseph Landsberg and Nicholas Coops.

Waring has published 245 scientific papers and has an h-index of 74. The original paper on the 3-PG model has attracted almost 2,000 citations.

== Career ==
Waring was a distinguished professor at Oregon State University and held guest professorships and visiting scientist appointments at the Botanical Institute, University of Innsbruck, Austria (1969–70); School of Forestry and Natural Resources, University of Edinburgh, Scotland (1976–77); Swedish University of Agricultural Sciences, Uppsala, Sweden (1981–82); Ecosystem Center, Marine Biological Laboratory, Woods Hole, Massachusetts (1986–87); University of Waikato, Christchurch, New Zealand (part of 1990); Land-Atmosphere Interactions, National Aeronautics and Space Administration (NASA), Washington, D.C. (acting program manager, 1992–93); Centre for Environmental Mechanics, CSIRO, Canberra, Australia (1996–97); Scottish Forestry Trust, Edinburgh, Scotland (part of 1998); and Centre for Water Research, University of Western Australia, Perth, Australia (part of 2007).

== Books ==
- Waring, Richard H.; Schlesinger, William H. (1985). Forest Ecosystems: Concepts and Management. Academic Press.
- Waring, Richard H.; Running, Steven W. (1998). Forest Ecosystems: Analysis at Multiple Scales. Academic Press. ISBN 9780127354439.
- Landsberg, J. J.; Waring, Richard H. (2014). Forests in Our Changing World New Principles for Conservation and Management. Island Press. ISBN 978-1-61091-496-3.
