= Orlando Rojas =

Canadian scientist in bioproducts and materials science

Orlando J. Rojas
- Born: Orlando J. Rojas; 1962 (age 63–64); Venezuela
- Education: Auburn University
- Known for: Renewable nano- and micro- particles from plant-based sources Nanocellulose products
- Scientific career
- Fields: Nanoscience; Nanotechnology
- Workplaces: University of British Columbia; Royal Institute of Technology

Orlando J. Rojas (born 1962) is a Venezuelan-born Canadian materials scientist and professor at the University of British Columbia (UBC) in Canada, and also, a visiting professor at Aalto University in Finland. He has received the Anselme Payen Award in 2018 by the American Chemical Society.

He holds the position of Canada Excellence Research Chair in Bioproducts, with appointments in the Departments of Wood Science, Chemistry, and Chemical & Biological Engineering. He presently is also the scientific director of the UBC Bioproducts Institute.

== Research career ==
Rojas received his B.Sc. from Universidad de Los Andes in Venezuela, an M.Sc. from Universitat Politècnica de Catalunya, and a Ph.D. from Auburn University. He completed postdoctoral research at the Royal Institute of Technology (KTH) in Sweden.

Rojas then joined the University of British Columbia in 2019 as Canada Excellence Research Chair in Forest Bioproducts. He directs the Bioproducts Institute at UBC, which develops renewable and sustainable materials from forest biomass. He leads the research group of Biobased Colloids and Materials (BiCMat), focusing on renewable nano- and microparticles (e.g. cellulose, lignin, proteins), sustainable processing, and bioinspired functional materials.

His research interests include: (a) Renewable nano- and microparticles from plant-based sources, (b) Sustainable biomass processing and green chemistry, (c) Biomimetic and bioinspired materials with hierarchical structure, and (d) Functional materials for catalysis, sensing, and controlled release

In August 2025, Rojas was ranked at the top 2% of researchers in the world at the area of polymers ("nanoscience – nanotechnology") having a very high c-score of 3.5912. Until October 2025, the entire research work of Rojas has received more than 54,000 citations at Google Scholar.

== Recognition ==
- Canada Excellence Research Chair (CERC) in Forest Bioproducts, University of British Columbia (2019–2026); which is one of Canada’s most prestigious academic positions, supporting transformative, high-impact research
- Fellow of the American Chemical Society (2013)
- Member of the Finnish Academy of Science and Letters (2017)
- Anselme Payen Award (2018), awarded by the American Chemical Society Cellulose and Renewable Materials Division
- TAPPI Fellow (2025)
- Listed among the top 1% of researchers globally by citations
- TAPPI Nanotechnology Division Technical Award and IMERYS Prize (awarded for novel work in renewable nanomaterials and industry-relevant nanotechnologies)
- Inaugural Faculty Scholar, North Carolina State University

== See also ==
- Wood science
- Nanocellulose
