= Nicholas Coops =

Nicholas Charles Coops
- Born: 1968 (age 57–58); Melbourne, Australia
- Awards: Canadian Remote Sensing Society Gold Medal, Marcus Wallenberg Prize

Academic background
- Education: PhD, 1995, Royal Melbourne Institute of Technology
- Thesis: The modelling of remotely sensed data: a local and a global case study (1996)

Academic work
- Institutions: University of British Columbia Commonwealth Scientific and Industrial Research Organization

Nicholas Charles Coops FRSC is an Australian-Canadian researcher. He is a Tier 1 Canada Research Chair in Remote Sensing at the University of British Columbia's Department of Forest Resources Management. In 2020, Coops received the Marcus Wallenberg Prize in recognition of his work in with satellite imagery in order to make predictions about forest growth and the ability of forests to store carbon.

== Early life and education ==
Coops was born in Melbourne, Australia in 1968. He completed his PhD at the Royal Melbourne Institute of Technology in 1995 and began working with the Commonwealth Scientific and Industrial Research Organization. During his time in Australia, Coops developed satellite and airborne remote sensing technologies to aid in forest management and conservation activities.

== Career ==
Coops left his native Australia in 2004 to become a Tier 2 Canada Research Chair at the University of British Columbia's Department of Forest Resources Management. In this role, he undertakes a range of research projects which apply remote sensing data to forest growth and biodiversity issues. Recently he has focused on the integration of LIDAR and optical remote sensing for forest growth, vegetation / forest classification and the use of drones for high spatial resolution forestry operations and applications. In 2012, Coops was promoted to a Tier 1 Canada Research Chair in Remote Sensing to continue his research into using remote sensing technologies to improve forest structure and function. After serving for seven years, Coops was renewed as a Tier 1 chair in 2019.

During his second term as a Tier 1 Canada Research Chair, Coops' research of expanding conceptual advancements to geospatial modelling was recognized on an international scale. In 2020, Coops was the co-recipient of the Marcus Wallenberg Prize in recognition of his work with satellite imagery in order to make predictions about forest growth and the ability of forests to store carbon. Coops was also awarded the silver and gold medals of the Canadian Remote Sensing Society (CRSS) in 2014 and 2020 respectively for his service and leadership in remote sensing in Canada. Coops was recognised by UBC with their 2020 UBC Killam Research Prize in the Applied Science, Medicine and Sciences senior category. Nationally, in 2022 Coops was elected a Fellow of the Royal Society of Canada for being "a global leader in the application of remote sensing technology for the management and monitoring of forest ecosystems." He was also named the 2022 Canadian Institute of Forestry Scientific Award recipient.
