= Josef Gierer =

Austrian-born Swedish chemist and wood scientist

- Born: 12 January 1919; Piesting, Austria
- Education: University of Vienna
- Occupations: Researcher; educator; organic chemist; wood scientist
- Years active: 1954–2001

Josef Franz Gierer (born 12 January 1919) is an Austrian-born Swedish chemist and wood scientist who is emeritus professor of organic chemistry, specialising in lignin research, who is a member of the International Academy of Wood Science and honorary recipient of the Anselme Payen Award.

His contributions in chemistry of wood and pulping have been well recorded. He was the recipient of the Ekman medal from the Swedish Association of Pulp and Paper (1989), and in 1992 received the prestigious Anselme Payen Award from the American Chemical Society for his yearlong scientific work.

Gierer was born in Piesting, Austria on 12 January 1919. In 1948, he achieved his Ph.D. degree at the University of Vienna, working on topics relating to organic chemistry.

He afterwards moved permanently to Sweden, where he worked at the Swedish Forest Products Laboratory in Stockholm (1951–1983). He later became a professor of wood chemistry at the KTH Royal Institute of Technology.

During his career, Gierer authored numerous publications in the area of wood chemistry.
