= Nanowood =

Wood-based heat insulating material

Nanowood is a heat-insulating material derived from wood, considered to offer slightly better insulation properties than Styrofoam. Nanowood is also more environmentally friendly and biodegradable than Styrofoam. It is lightweight, strong, and composed entirely of processed wood fibers.

Nanowood was developed by engineer Liangbing Hu and his team at the University of Maryland, College Park. According to the researchers, nanowood reflects approximately 95% of radiation energy and absorbs about 2% when exposed to the solar spectrum. By comparison, silica aerogel absorbs roughly 20% and transmits around 60% of the radiative heat it is exposed to. According to Tian Li, a member of the research team, the material has the potential to significantly reduce energy costs.

== Read also ==
- Transparent wood composites
