= Transparent wood composite =

Modified type of wood made transparent

A video of transparent wood produced with a DIY method

Transparent wood composite is a composite material made by chemically removing the light-absorbing lignin from wood and impregnating the remaining porous cellulose scaffold with a transparent polymer, such as poly(methyl methacrylate) (PMMA) or epoxy. This process renders the wood transparent by matching the refractive indices of the cellulose and the polymer, which minimizes light scattering.

First produced in 1992 by German researcher Siegfried Fink, the material has seen renewed research interest since 2016 due to its potential as a sustainable alternative to glass and plastic in the construction and energy sectors. Transparent wood composites exhibit high optical transmittance (up to 90%) and distinctive optical haze, which allows them to transmit light while distributing it uniformly.

Unlike glass, transparent wood possesses excellent mechanical properties; it is shatterproof, tough, and often retains or exceeds the strength of the original wood. It also offers superior thermal insulation compared to traditional glass windows. Potential applications for the material include energy-efficient glazing systems, substrates for solar cells, and touch-sensitive panels.

== History ==
A research group led by Professor Lars Berglund from Swedish KTH University along with a University of Maryland research group led by Professor Liangbing Hu have developed a method to remove the color and some chemicals from small blocks of wood, followed by adding polymers, such as poly(methyl methacrylate) (PMMA) and epoxy, at the cellular level, thereby rendering them transparent.

As soon as released in between 2015 and 2016, see-through wood had a large press reaction, with articles in ScienceDaily, Wired, The Wall Street Journal, and The New York Times.

Actually, those research groups rediscovered a work carried out by Siegfried Fink, a German researcher, from as early as 1992: with a process very similar to Berglund's and Hu's, the German researcher turned wood transparent to reveal specific cavities of the wood structure for analytical purpose.

In 2021, researchers reported a way to manufacture transparent wood lighter and stronger than glass that requires substantially smaller amounts of chemicals and energy than methods used before. The thin wood produced with "solar-assisted chemical brushing" is claimed to be lighter and about 50 times stronger than wood treated with previous processes.

== Process ==
In its natural state, wood is not a transparent material because of its scattering and absorption of light. The tannish color in wood is due to its chemical polymer composition of cellulose, hemicellulose, and lignin. The wood's lignin is mostly responsible for the wood's distinctive color. Consequently, the amount of lignin determines the levels of visibility in the wood, around 80–95%. To make wood a visible and transparent material, both absorption and scattering need to be reduced in its production. The manufacturing process of transparent wood is based on removing all of the lignin called the delignification process.

=== Delignification process ===
The production of transparent wood from the delignification process vary study by study. However, the basics behind it are as follows: a wood sample is drenched in heated (80 °C–100 °C) solutions containing sodium chloride, sodium hypochlorite, or sodium hydroxide/sulfite for about 3–12 hours followed by immersion in boiling hydrogen peroxide. Then, the lignin is separated from the cellulose and hemicellulose structure, turning the wood white and allowing the resin penetration to start. Finally, the sample is immersed in a matching resin, usually PMMA, under high temperatures (85 °C) and a vacuum for 12 hours. This process fills the space previously occupied by the lignin and the open wood cellular structure resulting in the final transparent wood composite.

While the delignification process is a successful method of production, it is limited to its laboratory and experimental production of a small, and low-thickness material that is unable to meet its practical application requirements. However, at Jiangsu Co-Innovation Center for Efficient Processing and Utilization of Forest Resources in 2018, Xuan Wang and his colleagues developed a new production method of infiltrating a prepolymerized methyl methacrylate (MMA) solution into delignified wood fibers. By utilizing this new technique, large-size transparent wood with any thickness or any measure can be easily made. Yet in spite of this success in the manufacture, challenges still exist with regard to mechanical stability and adjustable optical performance.

== Properties ==
Wood is a natural growth material that possesses excellent mechanical properties, including high strength, good durability, high moisture content, and high specific gravity. Wood can be classified in two types of wood, softwood and hardwood. While each type is different—e.g., the longitudinal cells in softwoods are much longer in length when compared to those of hardwoods, having though a very similar hierarchical structure, meaning the orientation of the cells is identical in the wood. This unique anisotropic structure, the properties with distinctive values when measured in several directions, allows it to pump ions and water for photosynthesis in the wood. Similarly, in transparent wood composites, removing the lignin and maintaining the cellulose fiber tubes it allows it to become a clear wood that can get soaked in a glue-like epoxy that makes it a robust and transparent material. An excellent raw material with high transmittance and enhanced mechanical properties.

Researchers have successfully tested an eco-friendly alternative: limonene acrylate, a monomer made from limonene, into an acrylate. Limonene is a common cyclic terpene that can be extracted from industrial waste, via isomerization of α‐pinene (from wood) or from citrus peel oil. The bio-based polymers can offer advantages compared to conventional non‐renewable polymers from fossil resources, and still retain a high mechanical performance and it is lightweight, stemming from its porous and anisotropic cellulosic structure; and is of great interest for large-scale sustainable nanotechnologies. Succinylation of the delignified wood substrate using succinic anhydride results in a nanostructured and mechanically strong biocomposite. The polymer matrix usually accounts for ≈70 vol%, results in nanostructured biocomposites combining an excellent optical transmittance of 90% at 1.2 mm thickness and a remarkably low haze of 30%, with a high mechanical performance (strength 174 MPa, Young's modulus 17 GPa).

=== Mechanical properties ===
Transparent wood derives its mechanical properties and performance primarily from its cellulose fiber content and the geometric orientation of the fiber tube cells (radial and tangential) structure, providing the structural base for the design of advanced materials applications.

One aspect of the transparent wood mechanical property is the strength of the material. According to Zhu and his colleagues, transparent wood in the longitudinal direction has an elastic modulus of 2.37 GPa and strength of 45.38 MPa (both which are lower than for pure PMMA) and twice as high as those perpendicular to the longitudinal direction, 1.22 GPa and 23.38 MPa respectively. They conclude that longitudinal to transverse properties decreased for transparent wood, which they expected as the presence of the polymer resin suppresses the cavity space. Also, the plastic nature of transparent wood composite provides advantages compare to other brittle materials like glass, meaning it does not shatter upon impact.

=== Optical transmittance and thermal conductivity ===
The transparent wood, tightly packed and perpendicularly aligned cellulose fibers operate as wideband wave-guides with high transmission scattering losses for light. This unique light management capacity results in a light propagation effect. By measuring its optical properties with an integrated sphere, Li and her colleagues found that transparent wood exhibits a high transmittance of 90% (lower than for pure PMMA) and a high optical haze of 95%. As a result, transparent wood as an energy efficient material could be used to decrease the daytime lighting energy usage by efficiently guiding the sunlight into the house while providing uniform and consistent illumination throughout the day.

Similarly, the transparent wood's thermal conductivity is attributed to the alignment of the wood cellulose fibers, which has been preserved after lignin removal and polymer infiltration. Transparent wood has a thermal conductivity of 0.32 W⋅m^{−1}⋅K^{−1} in the axial direction and 0.15 W⋅m^{−1}⋅K^{−1} in the radial direction respectably. Based on the study done by Céline Montanari of the KTH Royal Institute of Technology in Stockholm, the transparent wood's thermal conductivity, which transforms from semi-transparent to transparent when heated, could be used to make buildings more energy-efficient by capturing the sun's energy during the day and releasing it later at night into the interior.

== Future application ==
Although the development of transparent wood composites is still at a lab-scale and prototype level, their potential for energy efficiency and operational savings in the building industry are very promising. An essential advantage with transparent wood is its combination of structural and functional performance for load-bearing structures that combine optical, heat-shielding, or magnetic functionalities. Transparent wood is also researched for potential use for touch-sensitive surfaces.

Goze Mokudon, a bench-shaped andon lantern incorporating transparent wood panels (Goze Museum Takada, Joetsu, Japan)

In 2026, students at Nagaoka Institute of Design installed Goze Mokudon, a bench-shaped andon lantern incorporating transparent wood panels, in front of the Goze Museum Takada in Joetsu, Japan. Measuring approximately 40 cm high, 100 cm long, and 38 cm wide, the work uses LED-backlit transparent wood panels depicting Takada goze walking through a snowy gangi covered walkway.

=== Glazing system ===
Such is the case in building applications where artificial light can be replaced by sunlight through a light transmittance design. Based on research and simulation performed by Joseph Arehart at the University of Colorado Boulder, transparent wood as a glass glazing system replacement could reduce the space conditioning energy consumption by 24.6% to 33.3% in medium (climate zone 3C, San Francisco, CA) and large office spaces (climate zone 4C, Seattle, Washington) respectably. These are relevant insights in transparent wood's potential functionality because it shows lower thermal conductivity and better impact strength compared to popular glass glazing systems.

=== Solar cells ===
Another direction for transparent wood applications is as a high optical transmittance for optoelectronic devices as substrates in photovoltaic solar cells. Li and her colleagues at the KTH Royal Institute of Technology studied the high optical transmittance that makes transparent wood a candidate for substrate in perovskite solar cells. They concluded that transparent wood has high optical transmittance of 86% and long term stability with fracture of toughness 3.2 MPa⋅m^{1/2} compared to glass substrate fracture of toughness 0.7–0.85 MPa⋅m^{1/2}, which meets the substrate's requirements for solar cells. These are relevant information for transparent wood's possible application because it is a suitable and sustainable solution to the substrate for solar cell assembly with potential in energy-efficient building applications, as well as replacements for glass and lowering the carbon footprint for the devices.

Transparent wood could transform the material sciences and building industries by enabling new applications such as load-bearing windows. These components could also generate improvements in energy savings and efficiency over glass or other traditional materials. A lot of work and research is needed to understand the interaction between light and the wood structure further, to tune the optical and mechanical properties, and to take advantage of advanced transparent wood composite applications

== See also ==
- Nanowood
- Pykrete
