= Lars A. Berglund =

Swedish professor and materials scientist

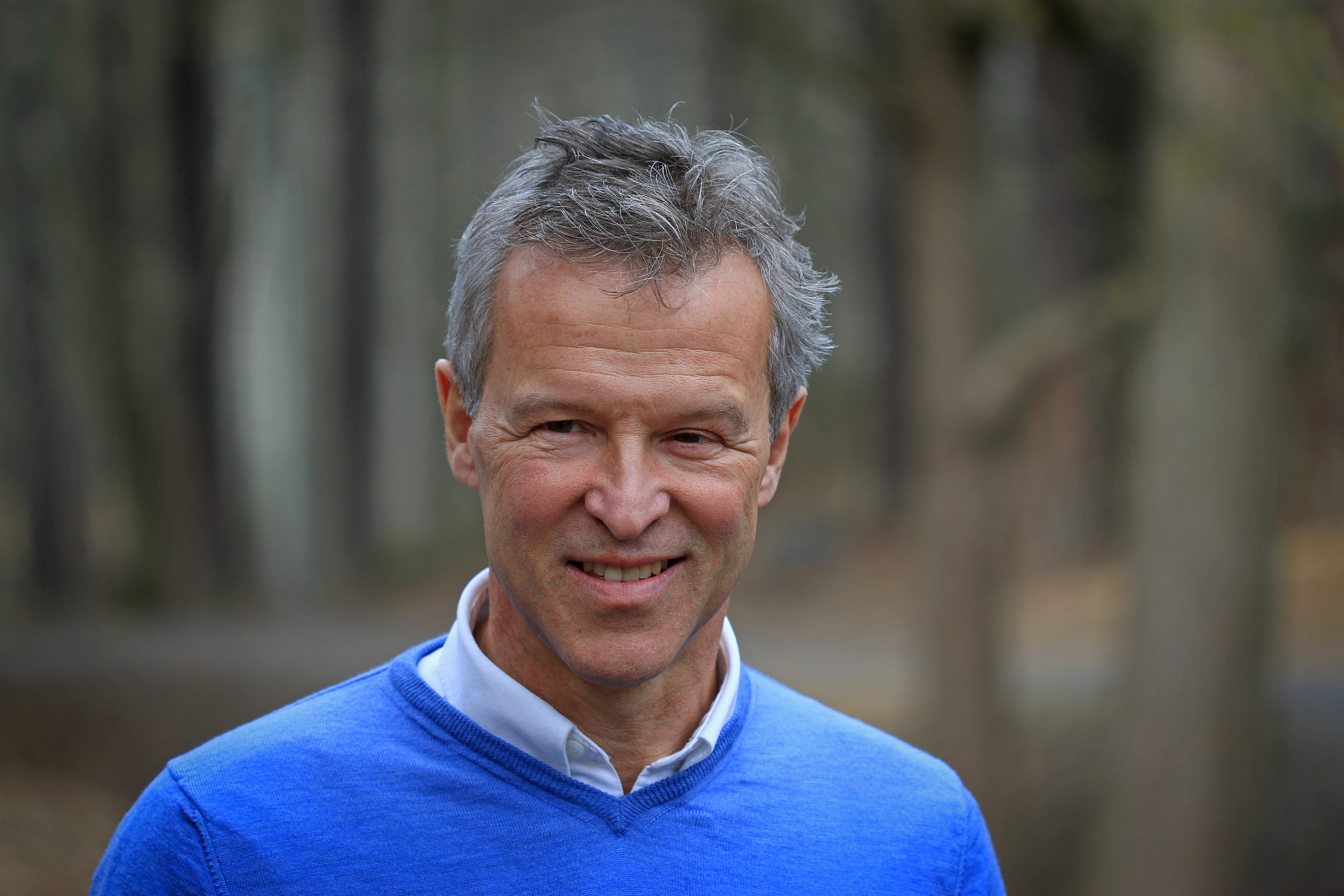
- Lars A. Berglund in 2016
- Born: March 28, 1960 (age 66); Stockholm
- Education: KTH Royal Institute of Technology
- Occupations: Researcher; educator; materials scientist
- Known for: transparent wood
- Awards: Member of the Royal Swedish Academy of Engineering Sciences; Recipient of Anselme Payen Award

Lars A. Berglund (born in 1960) is a Swedish professor and materials scientist, best known for pioneering research into transparent wood, a novel biomaterial derived from natural wood with applications in sustainable construction and optics.

He is a chaired professor at the KTH Royal Institute of Technology in Stockholm, researching in the field of wood nanotechnology.

== Research career ==
Berglund holds a Ph.D. in engineering and has served as a professor at KTH, where he leads research at the Division of Biocomposites. He has been a visiting researcher at Stanford University, Cornell University and Kyoto University. His research interest is in nanostructured composite materials, primarily those based on cellulose. Berglund has published more than 200 journal papers, examined more than 20 PhD's, while his work at Google Scholar has received -until May 2025- more than 46,000 citations.

He is a member of the Royal Swedish Academy of Engineering Sciences and also holds an ERC Advanced Grant on Nanotechnologies for Transparent Wood. In recent years, his research work focuses on the development of advanced wood-based materials with functional properties, emphasizing sustainability and innovation in renewable materials.

One of his most notable achievements is the development of transparent wood, an innovation in the area of wood science, which was created by removing lignin from natural wood and replacing it with a transparent polymer such as Poly(methyl methacrylate) (PMMA).

In 2023, he received the Anselme Payen Award, presented annually by the American Chemical Society: Cellulose and Renewable Materials (CELL) Division.

== See also ==
- Transparent wood
- Nanocellulose
- Biomaterials
