= Akira Isogai =

Japanese wood scientist and biomaterials researcher

- 磯貝 明
- Born: October 19, 1954 (age 72)
- Education: University of Tokyo
- Known for: Development of cellulose nanofiber (CNF) technologies
- Awards: Honda Prize; Marcus Wallenberg Prize; Anselme Payen Award
- Scientific career
- Fields: Wood science, Biomaterials science, Cellulose chemistry

Akira Isogai (磯貝 明, Isogai Akira; born October 19, 1954) is a Japanese academician, wood scientist and senior biomaterials researcher, who is an elected fellow (FIAWS) of the International Academy of Wood Science and also an elected fellow of the Japan Academy. He has been a chaired professor at the University of Tokyo, making several contributions to sustainable material science through his research work on plant cellulose and bio-nanofibers.

== Early life and education ==
Isogai was born in 1954 in Shimizu-ku, Shizuoka, Shizuoka Prefecture, where he grew up. He graduated from the Faculty of Agriculture at the University of Tokyo in 1980 and received his PhD in 1985 from the same institution with a dissertation on the preparation and characterization of substituted cellulose ethers.

After completing his doctorate studies, he served as a postdoctoral fellow at the Institute of Paper Chemistry in Appleton, Wisconsin, USA.

== Research career ==
Isogai joined the University of Tokyo as an assistant professor in 1986, was promoted to associate professor in 1994, and became a full professor in the Department of Biomaterial Sciences in 2003. He has held leadership roles in scientific societies, including the presidency of the Cellulose Society of Japan and positions in the Japan Technical Association of Pulp and Paper Industry.

His research focuses on the structural characterisation and applications of cellulose and cellulose nanofibers, including the development of TEMPO-mediated oxidation methods to improve CNF production efficiency and expand industrial uses. His work has contributed to the understanding of plant cellulose structures and supported sustainable material innovation.

In 2016, Isogai received the Honda Prize for his research on the high-efficiency cellulose nanofiber production methods and their applications. He has also received international awards, such as the Marcus Wallenberg Prize, and the Anselme Payen Award.

His main research contributions include works on cellulose characterization, and also, on biomaterials and nanofibers.

Until September 2026, Isogai has published more than 500 research papers, which have gathered more than 39,000 citations at Scopus.
