= Thomas Rosenau =

German-born Austrian chemist and wood scientist

- Born: Dresden
- Education: North Carolina State University
- Occupations: Researcher; educator; organic chemist; wood scientist
- Years active: since 1995

Thomas Rosenau (born 1969) is a German-Austrian chemist and wood scientist specializing in chemistry, who is professor at the Department of Chemistry at BOKU University in Vienna, and also, elected member at the International Academy of Wood Science and honorary recipient of the Anselme Payen Award.

== Research career ==
Rosenau completed his studies in chemistry at the Dresden University of Technology. He then carried out his doctoral and postdoctoral research at the North Carolina State University in Raleigh, USA. Following that, he returned to Europe and pursued his habilitation degree in organic chemistry at the BOKU University.

Presently, he serves as a full professor at the Department of Chemistry at BOKU University, and heads the Institute of Chemistry of Renewable Resources and the Austrian Biorefinery Center Tulln (ABCT).

His contributions in the wood chemistry and biochemistry fields, have been well recorded. His main research focus spans among wood-related topics associated with organic chemistry, green chemistry, and analytical chemistry. Lately he specialized in green methodologies and biopolymers, cellulose and lignin. In 2014, Rosenau received the scientific award, Anselme Payen Award by the American Chemical Society for his work. He has also received the International Lipid Research Award (known as ILRA).

He is an elected fellow at organizations such as the Royal Society of Chemistry (2019), the Japanese Academy of Science, and the International Academy of Wood Science (2009). Rosenau has authored two books, 24 book chapters, and over 480 SCI papers. He has supervised more than 50 postdoctoral scientists and 75 PhD and MSc dissertations. As of May 2024, Rosenau's research has gained more than 16,000 citations at Google Scholar.
