= Melt electrospinning =

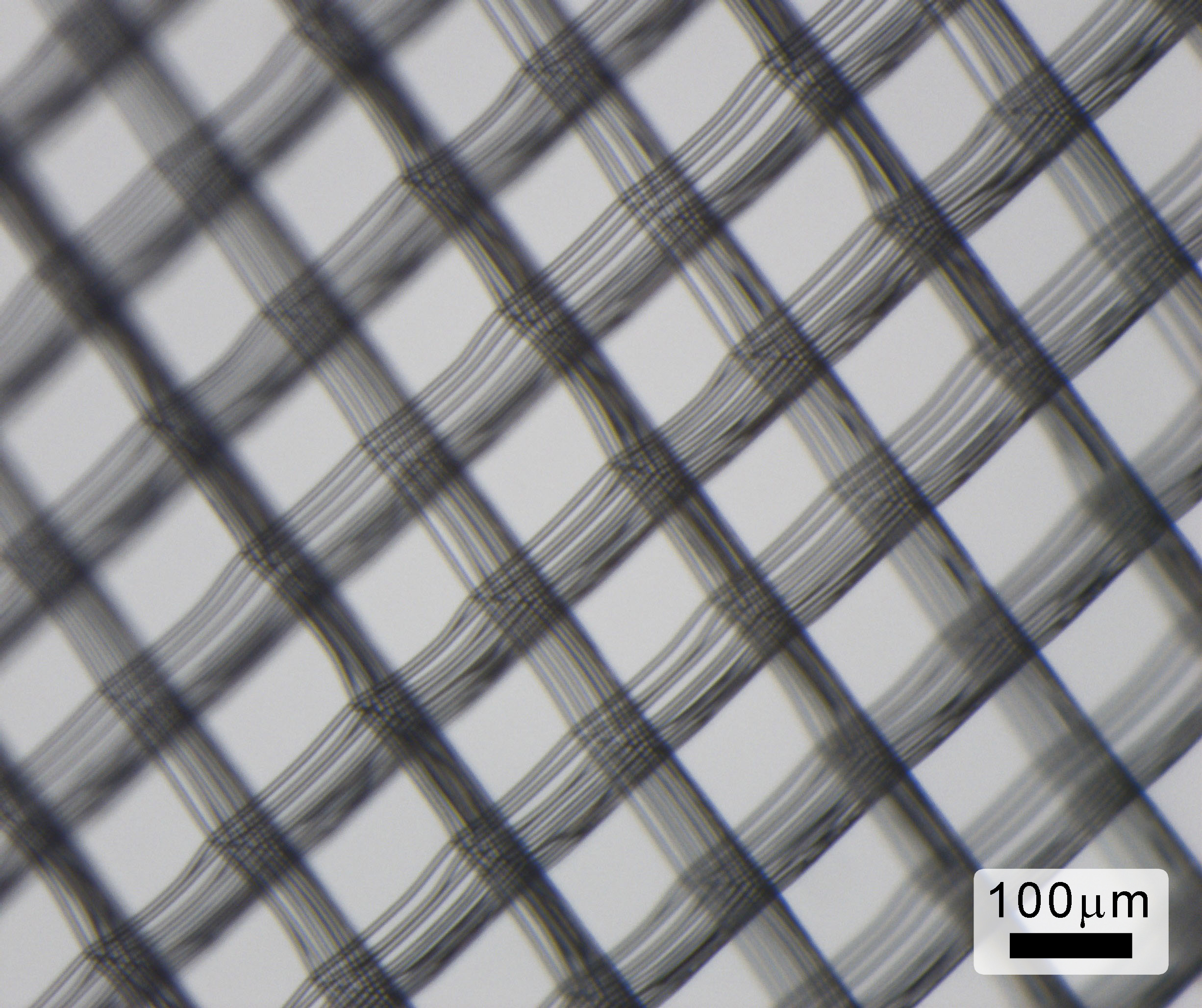
A polycaprolactone scaffold produced via melt electrospinning writing

Melt electrospinning is a processing technique to produce fibrous structures from polymer melts for applications that include tissue engineering, textiles and filtration. In general, electrospinning can be performed using either polymer melts or polymer solutions. However, melt electrospinning is distinct in that the collection of the fiber can be very focused; combined with moving collectors, melt electrospinning writing is a way to perform 3D printing. Since volatile solvents are not used, there are benefits for some applications where solvent toxicity and accumulation during manufacturing are a concern.

== History ==
The first description of melt electrospinning was by Charles Norton in a patent approved in 1936. After this first discovery, it wasn't until 1981 that melt electrospinning was described by Larrondo and Manley as part of a three-paper series. A meeting abstract on melt electrospinning in a vacuum was published by Reneker and Rangkupan 20 years later in 2001. Since this scientific publication in 2001, there have been regular articles on melt electrospinning, including reviews on the subject. In 2011, melt electrospinning combined with a translating collector was with proposed as a new class of 3D printing.

== Principles ==
The same physics of electrostatic fiber drawing apply to melt electrospinning. What differs are the physical properties of the polymer melt, compared to a polymer solution. When comparing polymer melts and polymer solutions, the former are normally more viscous than polymer solutions, and elongated electrified jets have been reported. The molten electrified jet also requires cooling to solidify, while solution electrospinning relies on evaporation. While melt electrospinning typically results in micron diameter fibers, the path of the electrified jet in melt electrospinning can be predictable.

== Parameters ==
=== Temperature ===
A minimum temperature is needed to ensure a molten polymer, all the way to the tip of the spinneret. Spinnerets have a relatively short length, compared to solution electrospinning.

=== Flow Rate ===
The most significant parameter for controlling the fiber diameter is the flow rate of the polymer to the spinneret - in general, the higher the flow rate, the larger the fiber diameter. While reported flow rates are low, all of the fluid electrospun is collected, unlike solution electrospinning where a great part of the solvent is evaporated.

=== Molecular Weight ===
The molecular weight is important as to whether the polymer can be melt electrospun. For linear homogeneous polymers, a low molecular weight (below 30,000g/mol) can result in broken and poor quality fibers. For high molecular weights (above 100,000 g/mol), the polymer can be very difficult to flow through the spinneret. Many melt electrospun fibers reported use molecular weights between 40,000 and 80,000 g/mol or are blends of low and high molecular weight polymers.

=== Voltage ===
Modifying the voltage does not greatly effect the resulting fiber diameter, however it has been reported that an optimum voltage is needed to make high quality and consistent fibers. Voltages from as low as 0.7kV up to 60kV have been used to melt electrospin.

== Apparatus ==
Different melt electrospinning machines have been built, with some mounted vertically and some horizontally. The approach to heating the polymer does vary and includes electrical heaters, heated air and circulating heaters. One approach to melt electrospinning is pushing a solid polymer filament into a laser, which melts and is electrospun.

== Polymers ==
Polymers exhibiting a melting point or glass transition temperature (Tg) are required for melt electrospinning, excluding thermosets (such as bakelite) and biologically derived polymers (such as collagen). Polymers melt electrospun so far include:

1. Polycaprolactone
2. Polylactic acid
3. Poly(lactide-co-glycolide)
4. Poly(methyl methacrylate)
5. Polypropylene
6. Polyethylene
7. Poly(caprolactone-block-ethylene glycol)
8. Polyurethane

These polymers are examples of the most used polymers, and a more comprehensive list can be found elsewhere.

== Uses ==
Potential applications of melt electrospinning mirror that of solution electrospinning. Not using solvents to process a polymer assists in tissue engineering applications where solvents are often toxic. Additionally, some polymers such as polypropylene or polyethylene are not readily dissolved, so melt electrospinning is one approach to electrospin them into fibrous material.

=== Tissue Engineering ===
Melt electrospinning is used to process biomedical materials for tissue engineering research. Volatile solvents are often toxic so avoiding solvents has benefits in this field. Melt electrospun fibers were used as part of a "bimodal tissue scaffold", where both micron-scale and nano-scale fibers were deposited simultaneously. Scaffolds made via melt electrospinning can be fully penetrated with cells, which in turn produce extracellular matrix within the scaffold.

=== Drug Delivery ===
Melt electrospinning is also capable to formulate drug-loaded fibers for drug delivery. It is a new formulation technique in the field of pharmaceutical technology to prepare amorphous solid dispersions or solid solutions with enhanced or controlled drug dissolution because it can combine the advantages of melt extrusion (e.g. solvent-free, effective amorphization, continuous process) and solvent-based electrospinning (increased surface area).

=== Melt Electrospinning Writing ===
The electrified molten jet created via melt electrospinning has a more predictable path, and polymer fibers can be deposited accurately onto the collector. When the collector is moved at sufficient speed (referred to as the critical translation speed), straight melt electrospun fibers can be deposited in a layer upon layer approach. This enables for the fabrication of complex, well-ordered structures. In this respect melt electrospinning writing (MEW) can be considered a class of 3D printing. Melt electrospinning writing has been performed using either a translating flat surface or a rotating cylinder/mandrel. Most polymers that can be melt-electrospun can also be written assuming the parameters can be tuned in such a way as to produce a stable jet. Piezoelectric polymers such as polyvinylidene difluoride (PVDF) have also been shown to be processable via MEW, opening up potential applications in 3d printed sensors, soft robotics, and further applications in biofabrication.
