= Sucrose synthase =

Protein family

Identifiers
- EC no.: 2.4.1.13
- CAS no.: 9030-05-1

Databases
- IntEnz: IntEnz view
- BRENDA: BRENDA entry
- ExPASy: NiceZyme view
- KEGG: KEGG entry
- MetaCyc: metabolic pathway
- PRIAM: profile
- PDB structures: RCSB PDB PDBe PDBsum
- Gene Ontology: AmiGO / QuickGO
Search
- PMC: articles
- PubMed: articles
- NCBI: proteins

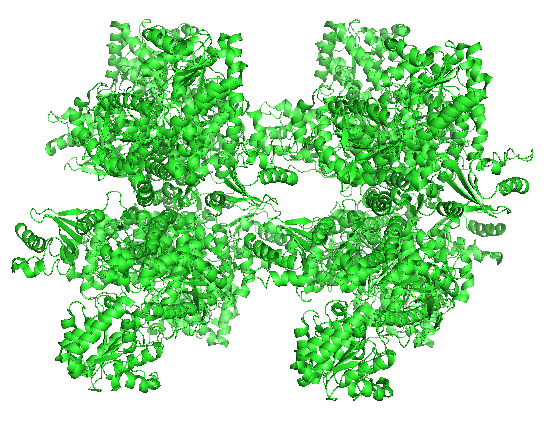
Ribbon diagram of sucrose synthase-1 3S27 structure, isolated from Arabidopsis thaliana.

Sucrose synthase

Identifiers
- Symbol: Sucrose_synth
- Pfam: PF00862
- InterPro: IPR000368
Available protein structures:
- PDB: IPR000368 PF00862 (ECOD; PDBsum)
- AlphaFold: IPR000368; PF00862

Sucrose synthase (EC 2.4.1.13) is an enzyme that catalyzes the chemical reaction

NDP-glucose +
fructose
NDP +
sucrose

The two substrates of this enzyme are NDP-glucose and D-fructose. Its products are nucleoside diphosphate (NDP) and sucrose. It has been characterised from many plants, including beet, rice, mung bean, broad bean, and Japanese pear. The related enzyme from the cyanobacteria genus Anabaena has different substrate affinity owing to its N-terminal sequence.

This enzyme belongs to the family of glycosyltransferases, specifically the hexosyltransferases. The systematic name of this enzyme class is NDP-glucose:D-fructose 2-alpha-D-glucosyltransferase. Other names in common use include UDPglucose-fructose glucosyltransferase, sucrose synthetase, sucrose-UDP glucosyltransferase, sucrose-uridine diphosphate glucosyltransferase, and uridine diphosphoglucose-fructose glucosyltransferase. This enzyme participates in starch and sucrose metabolism.
