= Joseph Landsberg =

Australian Forestry Scientist

Joseph (Joe) J. Landsberg
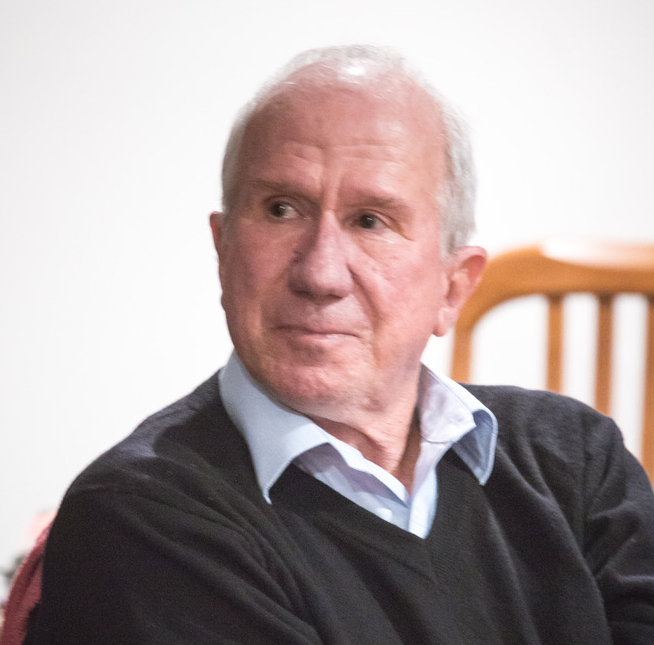
- Born: February 8, 1938 (age 88); Harare, Zimbabwe
- Education: PhD, University of Bristol, 1974; MSc Agriculture, University of Natal, 1961; BSc Agriculture, University of Natal, 1959
- Known for: Physiology ecology of forests and 3PG
- Spouse: Diana M. Landsberg
- Children: 4
- Scientific career
- Fields: Forest science
- Institutions: CSIRO; Murray-Darling Basin Commission

Joseph John Landsberg (born 8 February 1938), is an Australian scientist, author, science administrator and consultant. Born in Zimbabwe (then Rhodesia) he completed his BSc and MSc at Natal University, South Africa, and his Ph.D. at the University of Bristol, UK., where his research focused on the interactions between climate, weather, and forests around the world.

His work as a scientist and administrator over many years has made a significant contribution to our understanding of the ecophysiology of trees and forests, and the adoption of science-based models in forest management. He has published four books, been co-editor of five others and has published more than a hundred research articles, reports, and book chapters. He is best known as the co-developer of the forest growth model 3-PG (Physiological Processes Predicting Growth) for which he, together with Richard Waring and Nicholas Coops, won the 2020 Marcus Wallenberg Prize. The original paper on the 3-PG model has attracted almost two thousand citations.

== Career ==
Landsberg was Chief of the Division of Forest Research, in Australia's Commonwealth Scientific and Industrial Research Organisation (CSIRO) from 1981 to 1988. From 1990-1993, he was the Director of Natural Resources Management in the Murray-Darling Basin Commission.

He has held visiting fellowships at the University of Canterbury, Christchurch, New Zealand (2002). and the University of Helsinki, Finland (1998) and was an adjunct professor at Charles Sturt University, Bathurst, and the University of Queensland, Brisbane. Between 1993 and 1994 he was a Senior Visiting Scientist/Program Manager at NASA (USA), Science Division, MTPE Terrestrial Ecology and Oceanography Branch in the BOREAS program.

Landsberg is an External Member of the Finnish Academy of Science and Letters.

== Books ==
Full citations available on Google Scholar or WorldCat

- Environmental effects on crop physiology. (1977). J.J. Landsberg and C.V. Cutting, Editors. Academic Press
- Research for forest management. (1985). J.J. Landsberg and W. Parsons, Editors CSIRO, Australia
- Physiological Ecology of Forest Production. (1986). J. J. Landsberg. Acad. Press. London, Orlando
- Coupling of Carbon, Water and Nutrient Interactions in Woody Plant Systems. (1986). R.J.Luxmoore; J.J. Landsberg and M.R. Kaufmann, Editors. Heron Publishing Co., Victoria, Canada. (Published as Tree Physiology, vol.2)
- Applications of Physiological Ecology to Forest Management. (1997). J. J. Landsberg and S. T. Gower. Acad. Press. San Diego, London
- Biomass production by fast growing trees. (1988) J.S. Pereira and J.J. Landsberg, Editors. (Proc. NATO Advanced Research Workshop) Kluwer Academic Publishers, The Netherlands
- Advancing Toward Closed Models of Forest Ecosystems. (1991.) M.R. Kaufmann and J.J.Landsberg, Editors. Heron Publishing Company, Canada. (Published as Tree Physiology, vol.9)
- Physiological Ecology of Forest Production: Principles, Processes and Models. (2011). Joe Landsberg and Peter Sands. Acad. Press/Elsevier. London, Amsterdam. Washington
- Forests in our Changing World. (2014). Joe Landsberg and Richard Waring. Island Press
