= Rockcliffe St. J. Manley =

Canadian chemist

Rockcliffe St. J. Manley (26 March 1925 – 31 December 2011) was a Jamaican-Canadian chemist known for his development of the electrospinning technique of producing polymer nanofibres and for his work on cellulose.

== Early life ==
Manley was born in Kingston, Jamaica. His parents were Harvey Arnold Manley and Vinette Madaline Bingham, and he had 3 brothers and one sister.

== Academic career ==
He spent most of his later academic career at McGill University in Canada, in the Pulp and Paper Science Division of the Chemistry Department.

In 1953 he received his PhD from McGill University on the subject “Rotations, Collisions and Orientations in Model Suspensions” (supervised by Stan Mason), and published early papers on the physics of particle motions.

He made substantial contributions to cellulose research, but he was the first person to publish the electrospinning of a polymer melt. Manley electrospun molten polymers, and showed that they (if thin enough) had a shish-kebab structure. Later the technique of electrospinning was carried out by other authors using polymer solutions. Manley's PhD student, Lidia Larrondo, with whom he published the electrospinning work, was a refugee from General Pinochet’s Chile.

He developed a chain folding theory for the structure of cellulose, which was criticised at the time. He based his work on that of the Bristol University physicist Andrew Keller. Keller had come up with a structure for polyethylene that required the polymer chains to fold, in what are now known as lamellae, making up a spherulitic structure. Manley applied the same theories to cellulose, carrying out high resolution electron microscopy. Later it was generally accepted that the crystalline structure of cellulose is not chain folded.

Manley won the Anselme Payen Award from the Cellulose and Renewable Materials Division of the American Chemical Society in 2002.

== Honors and awards ==
- 2002 - Anselme Payen Award by the American Chemical Society
- 1976 - Fellow of the American Physical Society
- Fellow of the Chemical Institute of Canada

== Personal life and death ==
He was married twice, to Ulla-Brita Henriksson who predeceased him, and later to Linda St-Denis. His second cousin was the Prime Minister of Jamaica - Michael Norman Manley. He had one son, Peter Henrik Manley and four grand children. He was also step father to Martin & Annie St-Denis. Manley died on 31 December 2011 in St. Mary's Hospital (Montreal).
