= Ann-Christine Albertsson =

Swedish chemist (born 1945)

- Born: 5 July 1945
- Education: KTH Royal Institute of Technology
- Scientific career
- Fields: Chemistry
- Institutions: KTH Royal Institute of Technology
- Thesis: Studies on the Mineralization of C14-Labelled Polyethylenes in Aerobic Biodegradation and Aqueous Aging (1977)
- Doctoral advisor: Bengt Rånby

Ann-Christine Albertsson is a Swedish chemist, currently Professor at Royal Institute of Technology and the Editor-in-Chief of American Chemical Society's Biomacromolecules. Her research interest are biomacromolecules and polymers.

== Education ==
She earned her Doctorate from Royal Institute of Technology in 1977.

== Career ==
She started as a lecturer at Royal Institute of Technology in 1980 before serving as acting professor in 1986 until being official appointed as professor in 1989. She has also been visiting scholar at Polytechnic University of New York, University of Kyoto, University of Massachusetts at Amherst and Research Institute for Polymers and Textiles.

== Selected publications ==
- Recent developments in ring opening polymerization of lactones for biomedical applications, AC Albertsson, IK Varma - Biomacromolecules, 2003, ACS Publications
- The mechanism of biodegradation of polyethylene, Polymer Degradation and Stability, Volume 18, Issue 1, 1987, Pages 73–87.

== Recent publications ==
- Undin, Jenny; Olsén, Peter; Godfrey, Jamie; Odelius, Karin; Albertsson, Ann-Christine (2016). "Controlled copolymerization of the functional 5-membered lactone monomer, α-bromo-γ-butyrolactone, via selective organocatalysis". Polymer. 87. Elsevier BV: 17–25. doi:10.1016/j.polymer.2016.01.067. ISSN 0032-3861.
- Arias, Veluska; Olsén, Peter; Odelius, Karin; Höglund, Anders; Albertsson, Ann-Christine (2016). "Forecasting linear aliphatic copolyester degradation through modular block design". Polymer Degradation and Stability. 130. Elsevier BV: 58–67. doi:10.1016/j.polymdegradstab.2016.05.021. ISSN 0141-3910.
- Maleki, Laleh; Edlund, Ulrica; Albertsson, Ann-Christine (20 July 2016). "Green Semi-IPN Hydrogels by Direct Utilization of Crude Wood Hydrolysates". ACS Sustainable Chemistry & Engineering. 4 (8). American Chemical Society (ACS): 4370–4377. doi:10.1021/acssuschemeng.6b00938. ISSN 2168-0485.
- Nugroho, Robertus Wahyu N.; Odelius, Karin; Höglund, Anders; Albertsson, Ann-Christine (11 May 2016). "Highlighting the Importance of Surface Grafting in Combination with a Layer-by-Layer Approach for Fabricating Advanced 3D Poly(l-lactide) Microsphere Scaffolds". Chemistry of Materials. 28 (10). American Chemical Society (ACS): 3298–3307. doi:10.1021/acs.chemmater.6b00133. ISSN 0897-4756. PMC 5828707. PMID 29503506.
