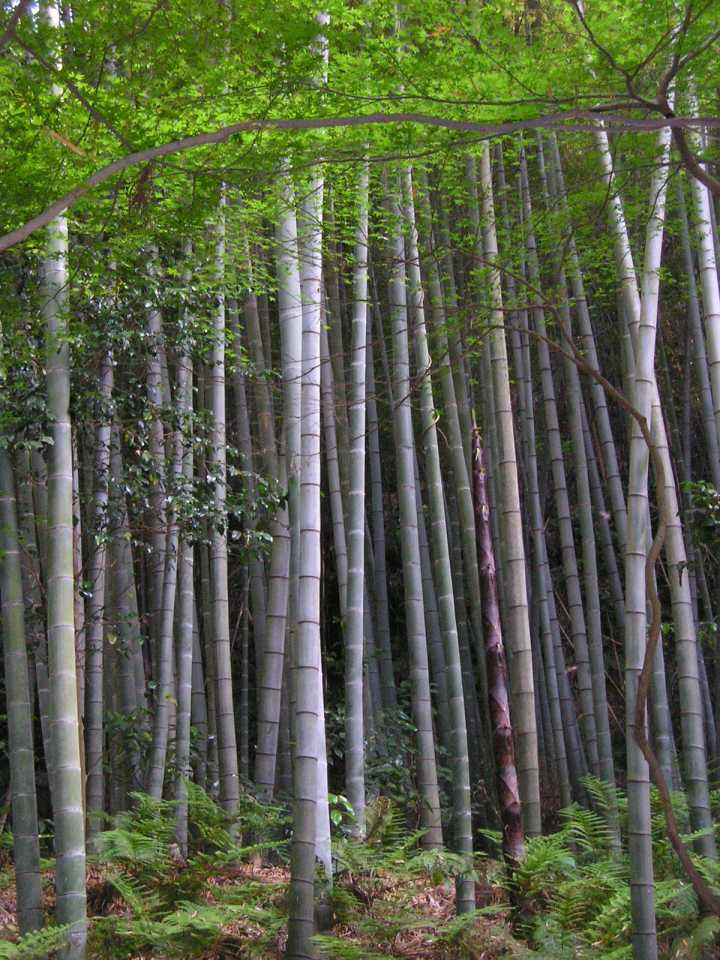
- Bamboo forest in Kamakura, Japan

Scientific classification
- Kingdom: Plantae
- Clade: Tracheophytes
- Clade: Angiosperms
- Clade: Monocots
- Clade: Commelinids
- Order: Poales
- Family: Poaceae
- Clade: BOP clade
- Subfamily: Bambusoideae; Luerss.

Tribes
- Arundinarieae; Bambuseae; Olyreae

Diversity
- >1,462 (known species) species in 115 genera

Synonyms
- Olyroideae Pilg. (1956); Parianoideae Butzin (1965)

= Bamboo =

Bamboo Temporal range: 55–0 Ma Early Eocene – Present

Subfamily of plants in the grass family

Bamboos are a diverse group of mostly evergreen perennial flowering plants making up the subfamily Bambusoideae of the grass family Poaceae. Giant bamboos are the largest members of the grass family, in the case of Dendrocalamus sinicus having individual stalks (culms) reaching a length of 46 meters (151 ft), up to 36 centimeters (14 in) in diameter and a weight of up to 450 kilograms (1,000 lb). It grows in tropical and subtropical regions, especially in Asia. The internodes of bamboos can also be of great length. Kinabaluchloa wrayi has internodes up to 2.5 meters (8 ft) in length, and Arthrostylidium schomburgkii has internodes up to 5 meters (16 ft) in length, exceeded in length only by papyrus. By contrast, the stalks of the tiny bamboo Raddiella vanessiae of the savannas of French Guiana measure only 10–20 millimeters (0.4–0.8 in) in length by about 2 millimeters (0.08 in) in width. The origin of the word "bamboo" is uncertain, but it most likely comes from the Dutch or Portuguese language, which originally borrowed it from Malay.

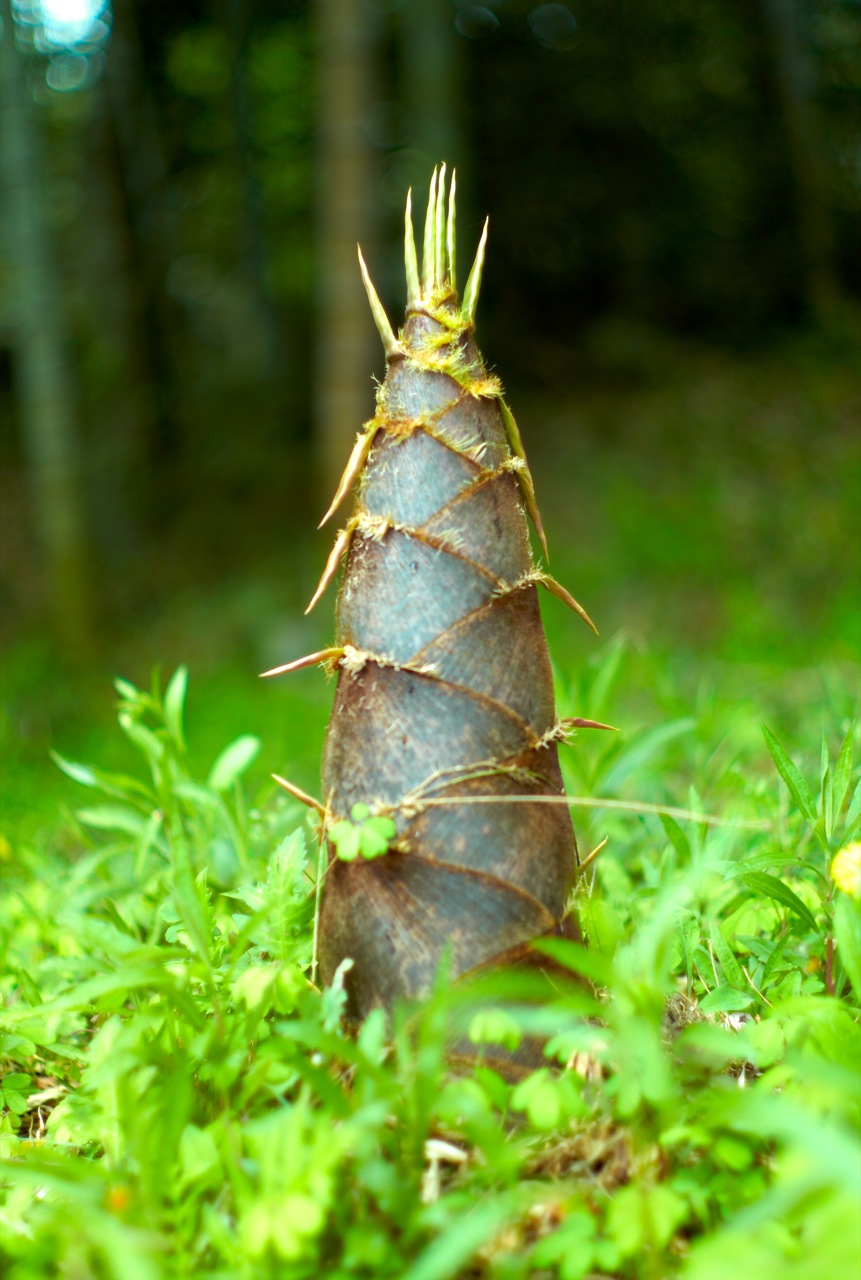
Fresh bamboo shoot emerging from the soil. These young, tender culms of bamboo plants are also widely harvested for culinary use in Asia.

In bamboo, as in other grasses, the internodal regions of the stem are usually hollow and the vascular bundles in the cross-section are scattered throughout the walls of the stalk instead of in a cylindrical cambium layer between the bark (phloem) and the wood (xylem) as in dicots and conifers. The dicotyledonous woody xylem is also absent. The absence of secondary growth wood causes the stems of monocots, including the palms and large bamboos, to be columnar rather than tapering.

Bamboos include some of the fastest-growing plants in the world, due to a unique rhizome-dependent system. Certain species of bamboo can grow 91 centimeters (36 inches) within a 24-hour period, at a rate of almost 40 millimeters (1 1/2 in) an hour (equivalent to 1 mm (0.04 in) every 90 seconds). Growth up to 120 centimeters (47.2 in) in 24 hours has been observed in the instance of Japanese giant timber bamboo (Phyllostachys bambusoides). This rapid growth and tolerance for marginal land make bamboo a good candidate for afforestation, carbon sequestration and climate change mitigation.

Bamboo is versatile and has economic and cultural significance in South Asia, Southeast Asia, and East Asia, being used for building materials, as a food source, and as a raw product, and depicted often in arts, such as in bamboo paintings and bambooworking. Bamboo, like wood, is a natural composite material with a high strength-to-weight ratio useful for structures. Bamboo's strength-to-weight ratio is similar to timber, and its strength is generally similar to a strong softwood or hardwood timber. Some bamboo species have displayed remarkable strength under test conditions. Bambusa tulda of Bangladesh and adjoining India has tested as high as 60,000 psi (400 MPa) in tensile strength. Other bamboo species make extraordinarily hard material.

== Taxonomy ==
- BOP clade
  - - Bambusoideae
      - - Bambuseae (tropical woody bamboos)
        - Olyreae (herbaceous bamboos)
      - Arundinarieae (temperate woody bamboos)
    - Pooideae
  - Oryzoideae

Phylogeny of the bamboo within the BOP clade of grasses, as suggested by analyses of the whole of Poaceae and of the bamboos in particular

Bamboos have long been considered the most basal grass genera, mostly because of the presence of bracteate, indeterminate inflorescences, "pseudospikelets", and flowers with three lodicules, six stamens, and three stigmata. Following more recent molecular phylogenetic research, many tribes and genera of grasses formerly included in the Bambusoideae are now classified in other subfamilies, e.g. the Anomochlooideae, the Puelioideae, and the Ehrhartoideae. The subfamily in its current sense belongs to the BOP clade of grasses, where it is sister to the Pooideae (bluegrasses and relatives).

The bamboos comprise three clades classified as tribes, and these strongly correspond with geographic divisions representing the New World herbaceous species (Olyreae), tropical woody bamboos (Bambuseae), and temperate woody bamboos (Arundinarieae). The woody bamboos do not form a monophyletic group; instead, the tropical woody and herbaceous bamboos are sister to the temperate woody bamboos. Altogether, more than 1,400 species are placed in 115 genera.

The bamboo taxonomy is in agreement with molecular phylogeny based on chloroplast DNA, reflecting the maternal line of descent. The nuclear genome of bamboos shows a more complex pattern of branching due to the presence of subgenomes from ancient hybridization events leading to allopolyploidy. The herbaceous bamboos are diploid (HH), the temperate woody ones are tetraploid (CCDD), the neotropical woody ones are tetraploid (BBCC), and the paleotropical woody ones are hexaploid (AABBCC).

Tribe Olyreae (herbaceous bamboos)

22 genera:

- Subtribe Buergersiochloinae
  one genus: Buergersiochloa.
- Subtribe Olyrineae
  18 genera: Agnesia, Arberella, Brasilochloa, Cryptochloa, Diandrolyra, Ekmanochloa, Froesiochloa, Lithachne, Maclurolyra, Mniochloa, Olyra, Parodiolyra, Piresiella, Raddia, Raddiella, Rehia, Reitzia (syn. Piresia), Sucrea.
- Subtribe Parianinae
  three genera: Eremitis, Pariana, Parianella.
Tribe Bambuseae (tropical woody bamboos)

73 genera:

- Subtribe Arthrostylidiinae:
  15 genera: Actinocladum, Alvimia, Arthrostylidium, Athroostachys, Atractantha, Aulonemia, Cambajuva, Colanthelia, Didymogonyx, Elytrostachys, Filgueirasia, Glaziophyton, Merostachys, Myriocladus, Rhipidocladum.
- Subtribe Bambusinae:
  17 genera: Bambusa, Bonia, Cochinchinochloa, Dendrocalamus, Fimbribambusa, Gigantochloa, Maclurochloa, Melocalamus, Neomicrocalamus, Oreobambos, Oxytenanthera, Phuphanochloa, Pseudoxytenanthera, Soejatmia, Thyrsostachys, Vietnamosasa, Yersinochloa.
- Subtribe Chusqueinae:
  one genus: Chusquea.
- Subtribe Dinochloinae:
  7 genera: Cyrtochloa, Dinochloa, Mullerochloa, Neololeba, Pinga, Parabambusa, Sphaerobambos.
- Subtribe Greslaniinae:
  one genus: Greslania.
- Subtribe Guaduinae:
  5 genera: Apoclada, Eremocaulon, Guadua, Olmeca, Otatea.
- Subtribe Hickeliinae:
  9 genera: Cathariostachys, Decaryochloa, Hickelia, Hitchcockella, Nastus, Perrierbambus, Sirochloa, Sokinochloa, Valiha.
- Subtribe Holttumochloinae:
  3 genera: Holttumochloa, Kinabaluchloa, Nianhochloa.
- Subtribe Melocanninae:
  9 genera: Annamocalamus, Cephalostachyum, Davidsea, Melocanna, Neohouzeaua, Ochlandra, Pseudostachyum, Schizostachyum, Stapletonia.
- Subtribe Racemobambosinae:
  3 genera: Chloothamnus, Racemobambos, Widjajachloa.
- Subtribe Temburongiinae:
  one genus: Temburongia.
- incertae sedis
  2 genera: Ruhooglandia, Temochloa.
Tribe Arundinarieae (temperate woody bamboos)

33 genera: Acidosasa, Ampelocalamus, Arundinaria, Bashania, Bergbambos, Chimonobambusa, Chimonocalamus, Drepanostachyum, Fargesia, Ferrocalamus, Gaoligongshania, Gelidocalamus, Himalayacalamus, Indocalamus, Indosasa, Kuruna, Oldeania, Oligostachyum, Phyllostachys, Pleioblastus, Pseudosasa, Sarocalamus, Sasa, Sasaella, Sasamorpha, Semiarundinaria, Shibataea, Sinobambusa, Sinosasa, Thamnocalamus, Tongpeia, Vietnamocalamus, Yushania.

== Distribution ==
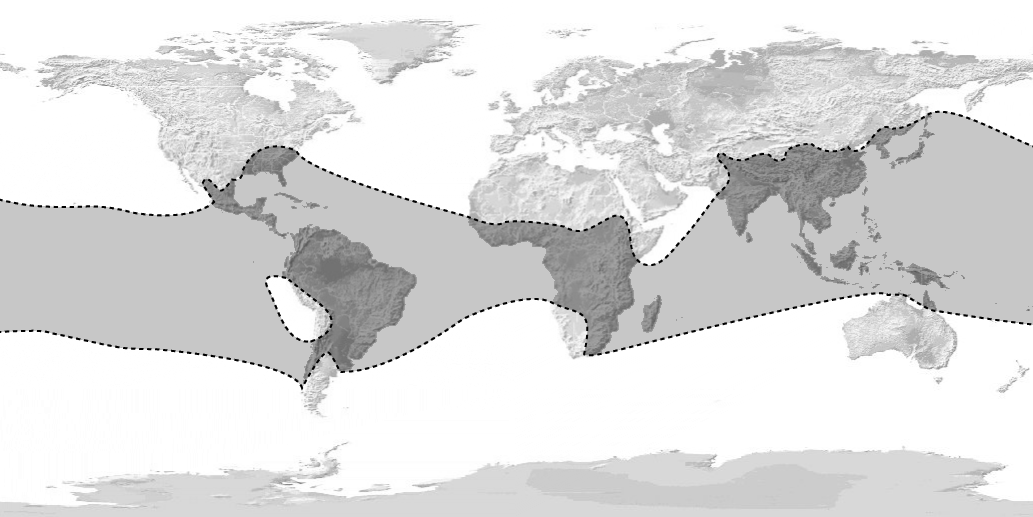
Worldwide distribution of bamboos (Bambusoideae)

Most bamboo species are native to warm and moist tropical and to warm temperate climates. Their range also extends to cool mountainous regions and highland cloud forests.

In the Asia-Pacific region, they occur across East Asia, from north to 50 °N latitude in Sakhalin, to south to northern Australia, and west to India and the Himalayas. China, Japan, Korea, India and Australia, all have several endemic populations. They also occur in small numbers in sub-Saharan Africa, confined to tropical areas, from southern Senegal in the north to southern Mozambique and Madagascar in the south. In the Americas, bamboo has a native range from 47 °S in southern Argentina and the beech forests of central Chile, through the South American tropical rainforests, to the Andes in Ecuador near 4,300 m (14,000 ft), with a noticeable gap through the Atacama Desert.

Three species of bamboo, all in the genus Arundinaria, are native to the Southeastern United States. Bamboo thickets called canebrakes once formed a dominant ecosystem in some parts of the Southeastern United States, but they are now considered critically endangered ecosystems. Canada and continental Europe are not known to have any native species of bamboo. Many species are also cultivated as garden plants outside of this range, including in Europe and areas of North America where no native wild bamboo exists.

Recently, some attempts have been made to grow bamboo on a commercial basis in the Great Lakes region of east-central Africa, especially in Rwanda. In the United States, several companies are growing, harvesting, and distributing species such as Phyllostachys nigra (Henon) and Phyllostachys edulis (Moso).

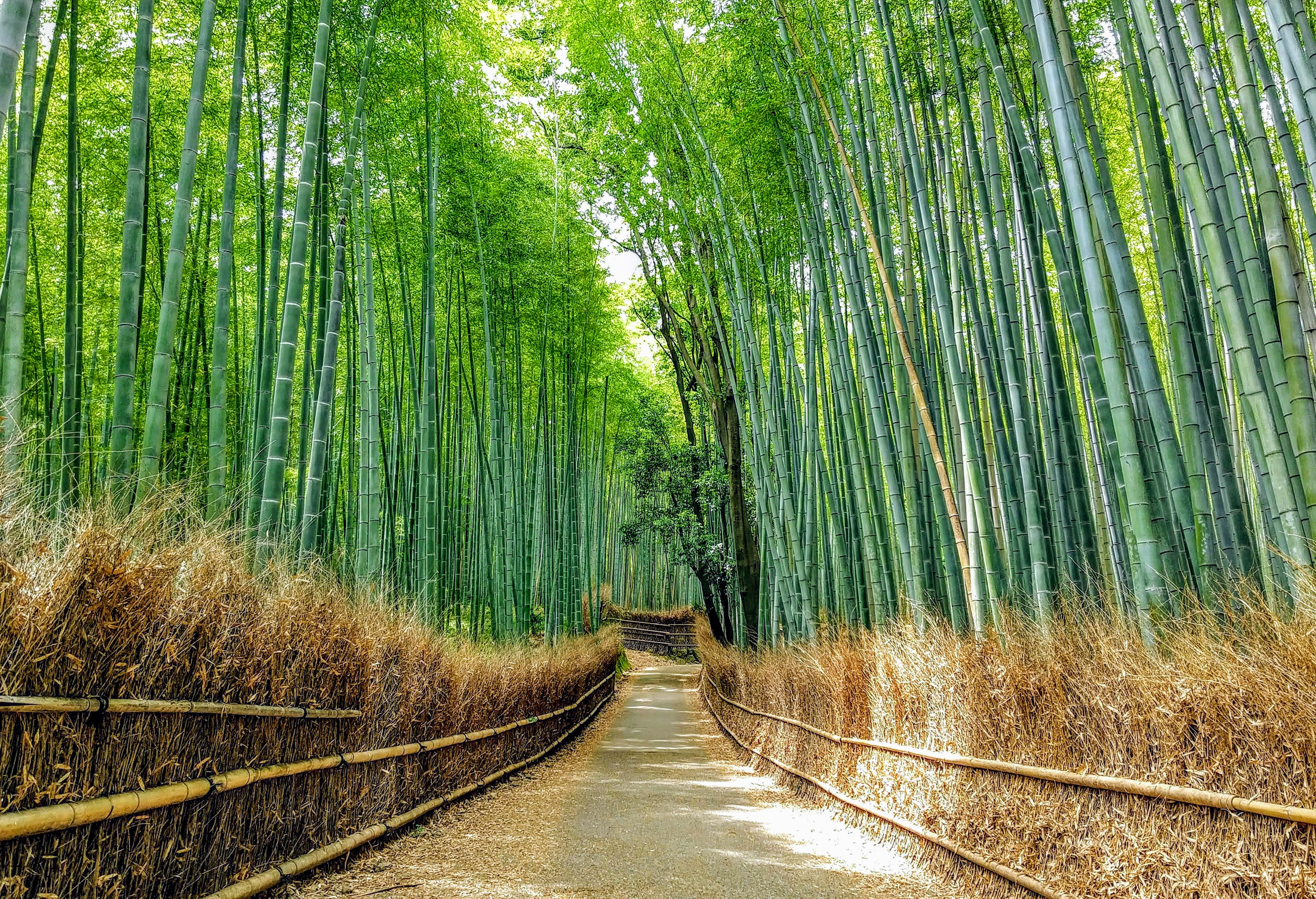
Bamboo forest in Arashiyama, Kyoto, Japan

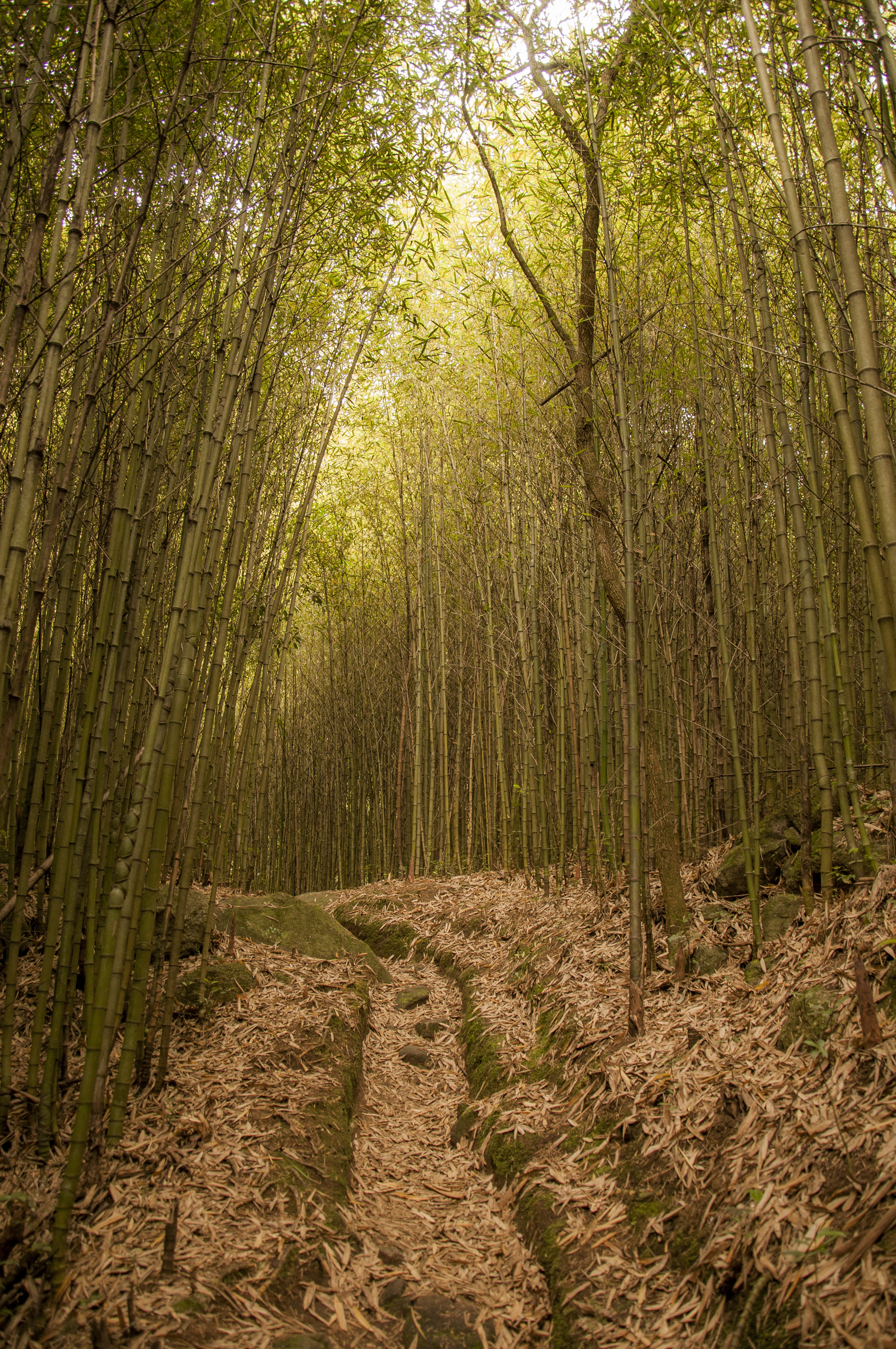
Serra dos Órgãos National Park, Brazil

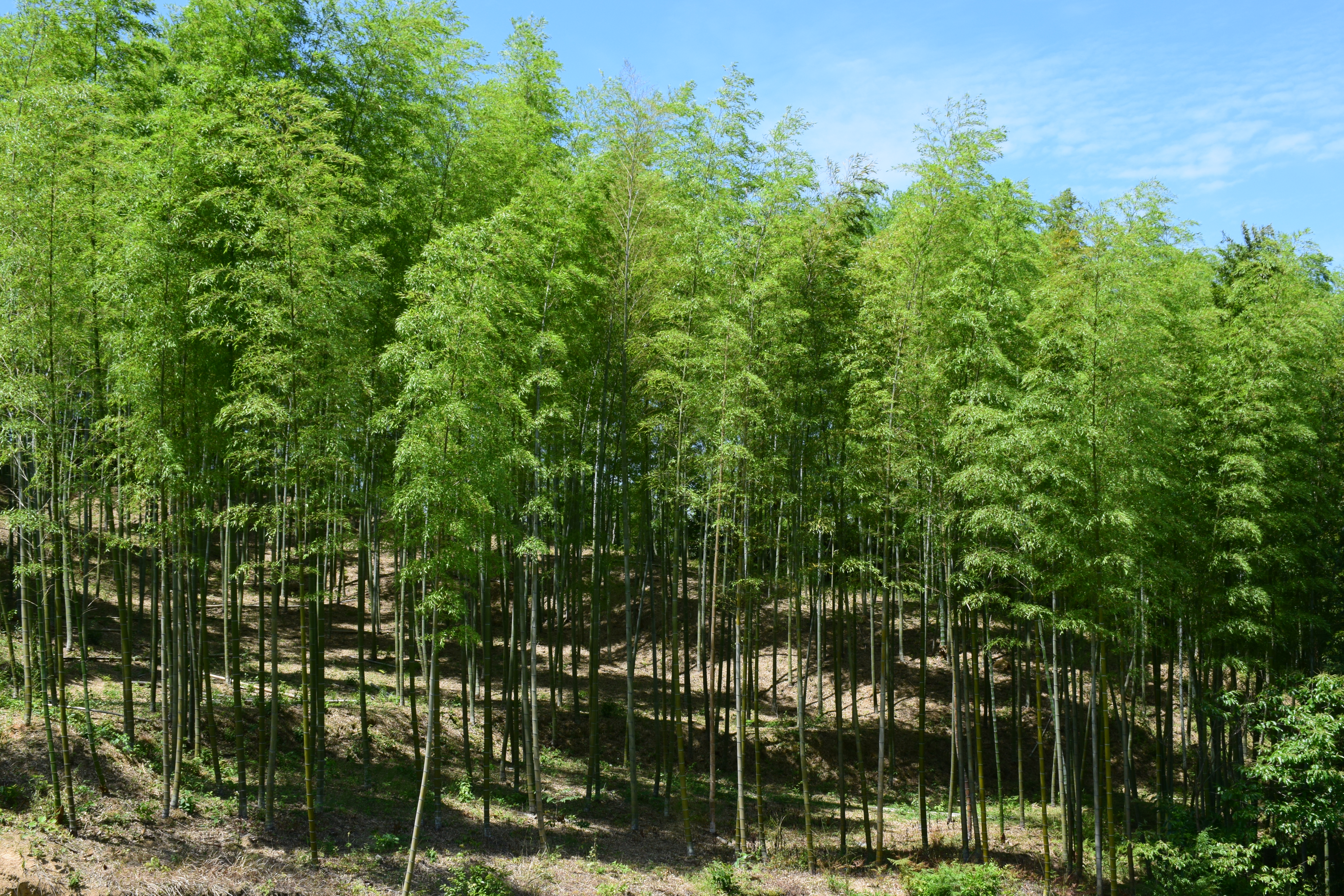
Bamboo forest in Guangde, China

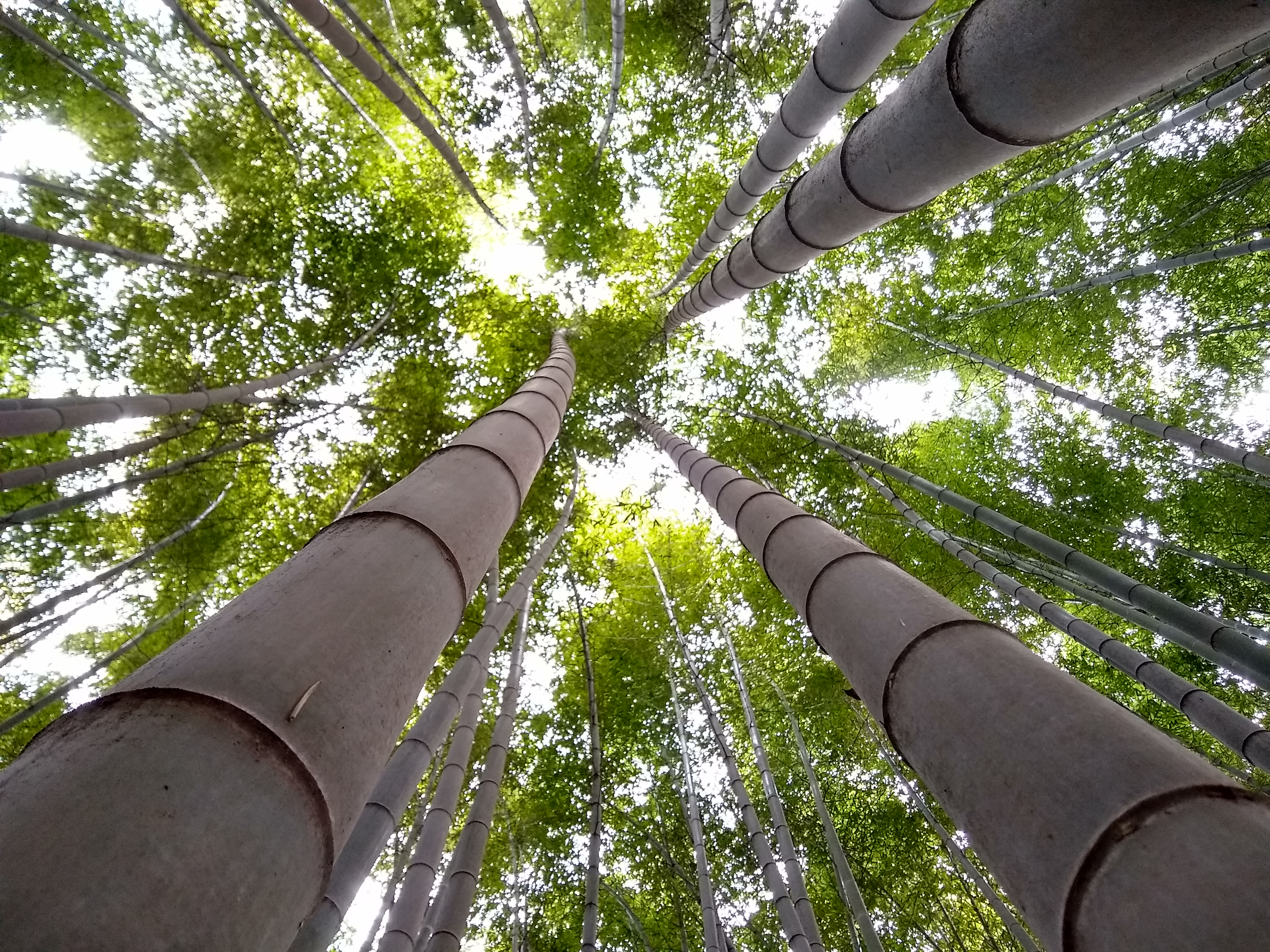
Bamboo forest, Gochangupseong Fortress, South Korea

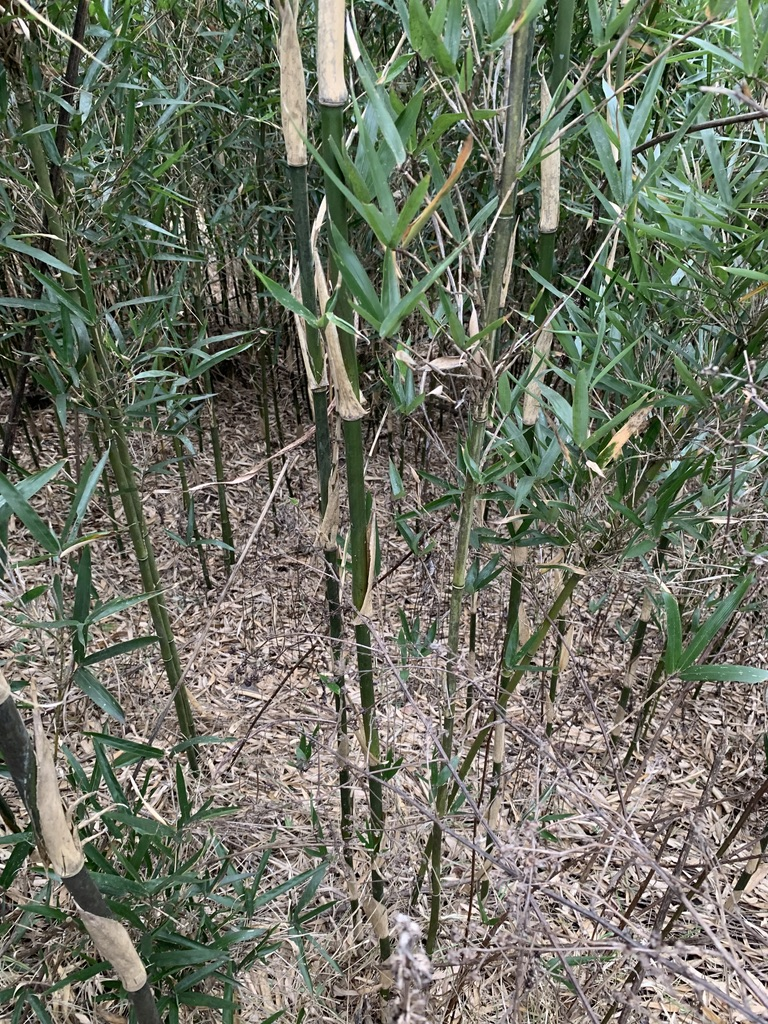
Arundinaria gigantea, a North American bamboo, in Kentucky

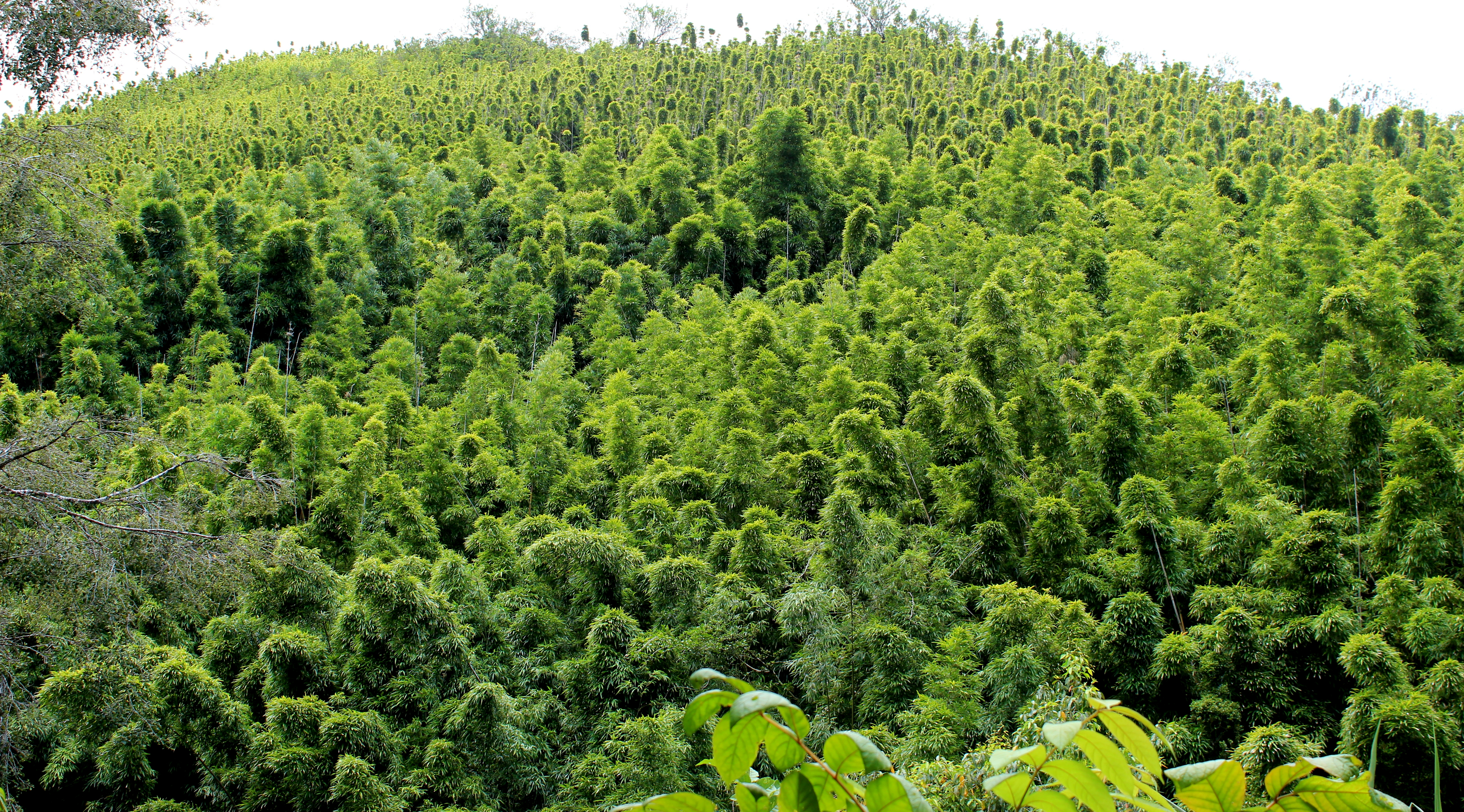
Panoramic view of bamboo forest in Hawaii

== Ecology ==
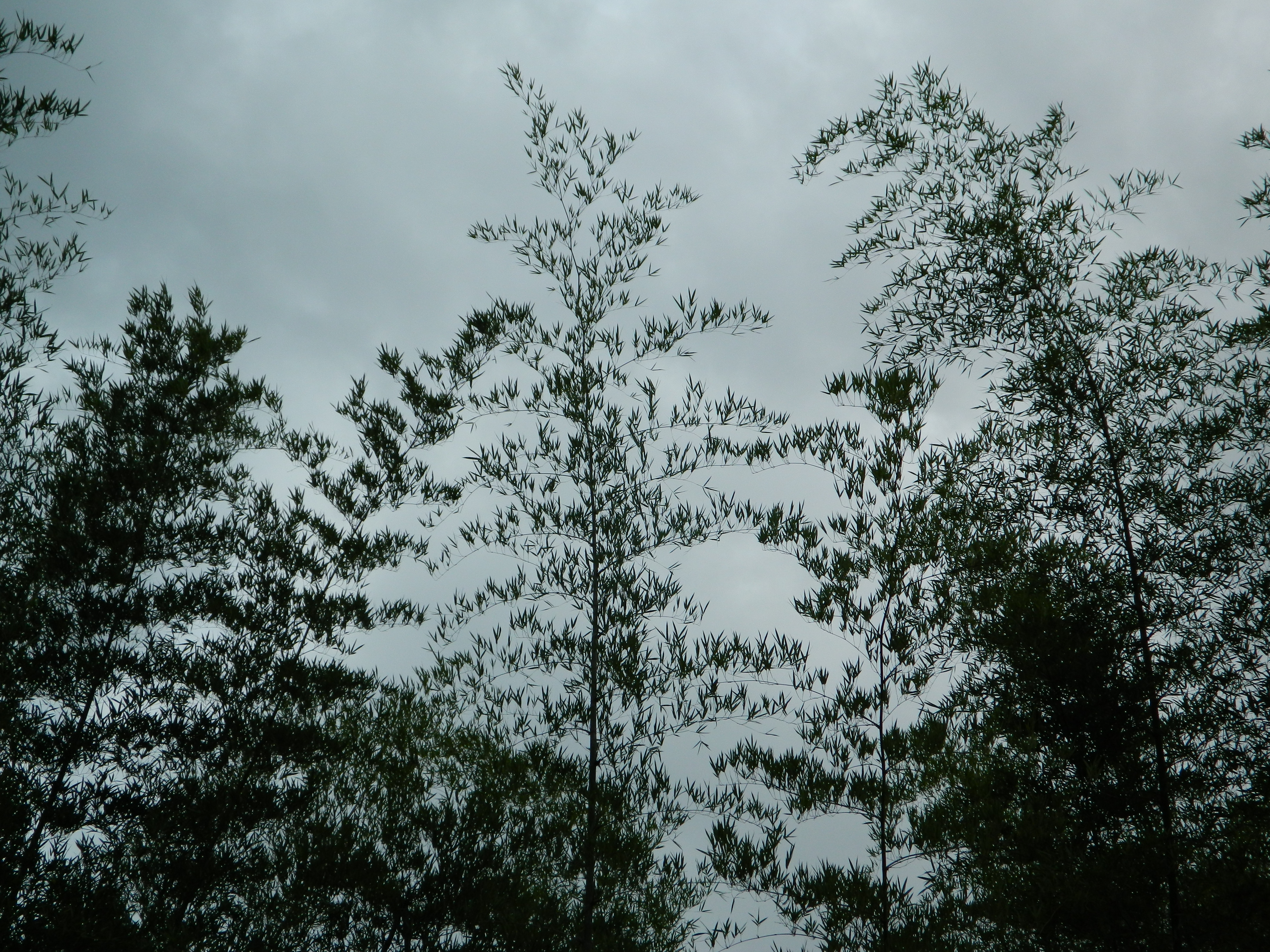
Bamboo canopy

The two general patterns for the growth of bamboo are "clumping", and "running", with short and long underground rhizomes, respectively. Clumping bamboo species tend to spread slowly, as the growth pattern of the rhizomes is to simply expand the root mass gradually, similar to ornamental grasses. Running bamboos need to be controlled during cultivation because of their potential for aggressive behavior. They spread mainly through their rhizomes, which can spread widely underground and send up new culms to break through the surface. Running bamboo species are highly variable in their tendency to spread; this is related to the species, soil and climate conditions. Some send out runners of several meters a year, while others stay in the same general area for long periods. If neglected, over time, they can cause problems by moving into adjacent areas.

Bamboos include some of the fastest-growing plants on Earth, with reported growth rates up to 910 mm (36 in) in 24 hours. These depend on local soil and climatic conditions, as well as species, and a more typical growth rate for many commonly cultivated bamboos in temperate climates is in the range of 30–100 mm (1–4 in) per day during the growing period. Some of the largest timber bamboo grow over 30 m (100 ft) tall, and be as large as 250–300 mm (10–12 in) in diameter. The size range for mature bamboo is species-dependent, with the smallest bamboos reaching only several inches high at maturity. A typical height range covering many of the common bamboos grown in the United States is 4.5–12 m (15–39 ft), depending on species. Anji County of China, known as the "Town of Bamboo", provides the optimal climate and soil conditions to grow, harvest, and process some of the most valued bamboo poles available worldwide.

Unlike all trees, individual bamboo culms emerge from the ground at their full diameter and grow to their full height in a single growing season of three to four months. During this time, each new shoot grows vertically into a culm with no branching out until the majority of the mature height is reached. Then, the branches extend from the nodes and leafing out occurs. In the next year, the pulpy wall of each culm slowly hardens. During the third year, the culm hardens further. The shoot is now a fully mature culm. Over the next 2–5 years (depending on species), fungus begins to form on the outside of the culm, which eventually penetrates and overcomes the culm. About 5–8 years later (species- and climate-dependent), the fungal growths cause the culm to collapse and decay. This brief life means culms are ready for harvest and suitable for use in construction within about three to seven years. Individual bamboo culms do not get any taller or larger in diameter in subsequent years than they do in their first year, and they do not replace any growth lost from pruning or natural breakage. Bamboo has a wide range of hardiness depending on species and locale. Small or young specimens of an individual species produce small culms initially. As the clump and its rhizome system mature, taller and larger culms are produced each year until the plant approaches its particular species limits of height and diameter.

Many tropical bamboo species die at or near freezing temperatures, while some of the hardier temperate bamboos survive temperatures as low as −29 °C (−20 °F). Some of the hardiest bamboo species are grown in USDA plant hardiness zone 5, although they typically defoliate and may even lose all above-ground growth, yet the rhizomes survive and send up shoots again the next spring. In milder climates, such as USDA zone 7 and above, most bamboo remain fully leafed out and green year-round.

=== Mass flowering ===
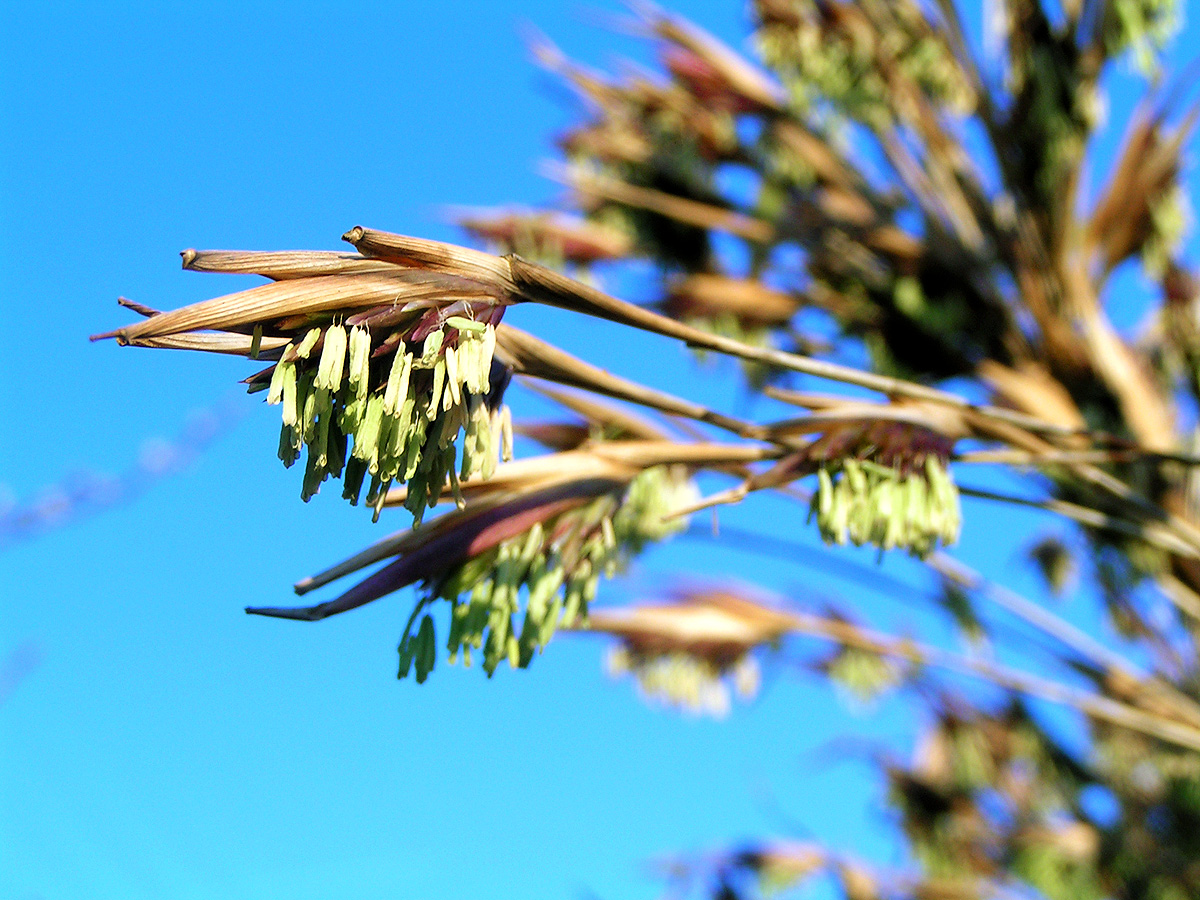
Flowering bamboo

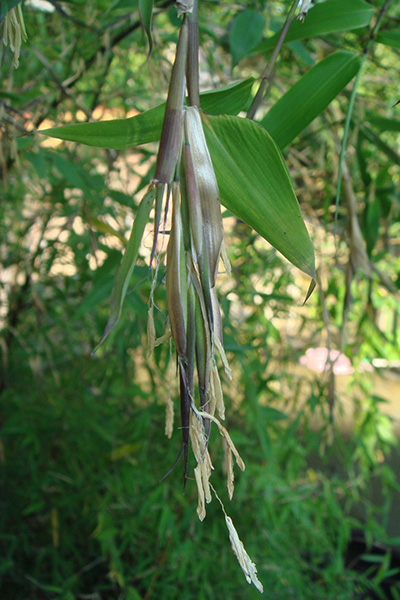
Phyllostachys glauca 'Yunzhu' in flower

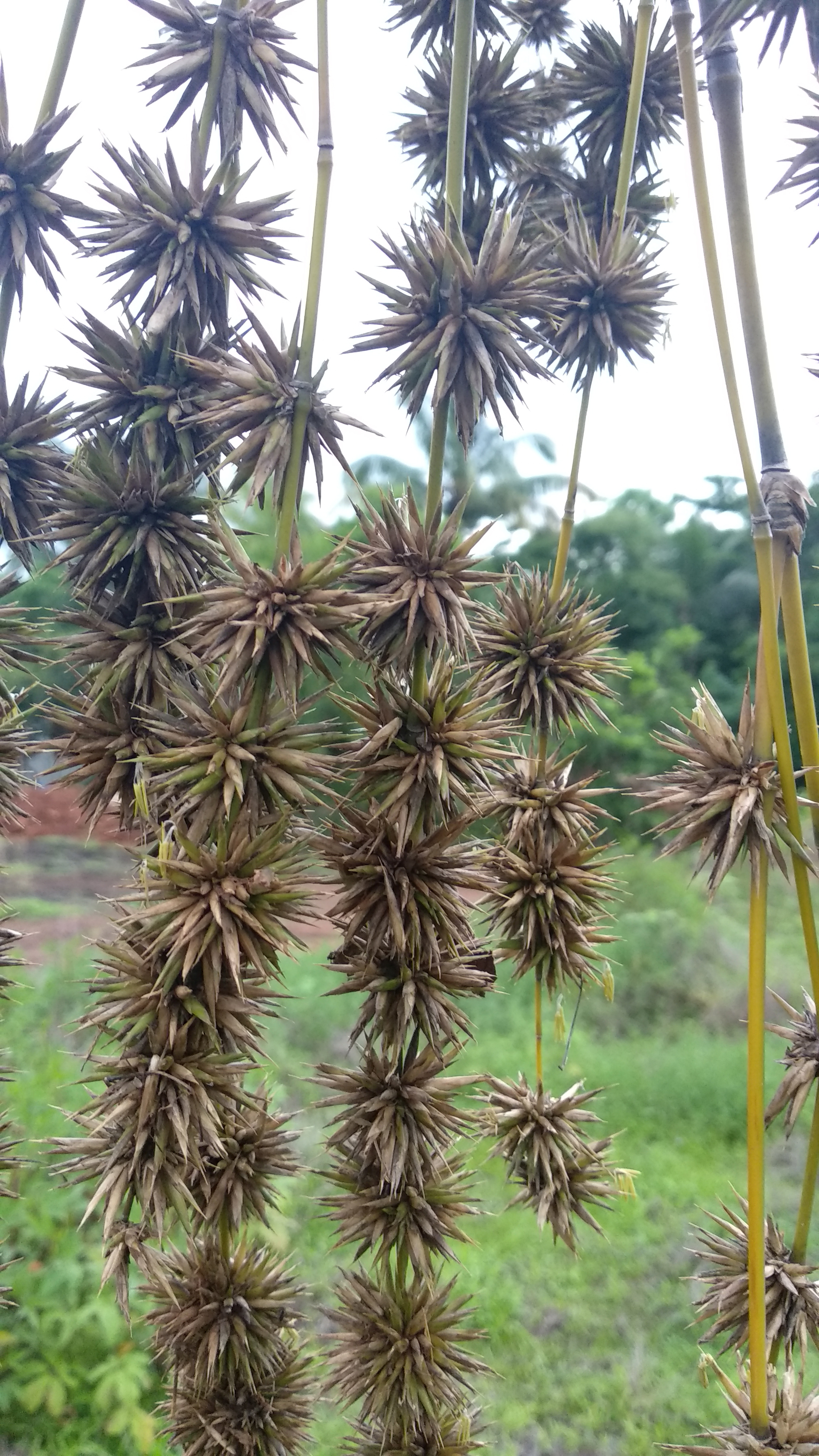
Bunches of bamboo seeds

Bamboos seldom and unpredictably flower and the frequency of flowering varies greatly from species to species. Once flowering takes place, a plant declines and often dies entirely. In fact, many species only flower at intervals as long as 65 or 120 years. These taxa exhibit mass flowering (or gregarious flowering), with all plants in a particular 'cohort' flowering over a several-year period. Any plant derived through clonal propagation from this cohort will also flower regardless of whether it has been planted in a different location. The longest mass flowering interval known is 120 years, and it is for the species Phyllostachys bambusoides (Sieb. & Zucc.). In this species, all plants of the same stock flower at the same time, regardless of differences in geographic locations or climatic conditions, and then the bamboo dies. The commercially important bamboo Guadua, or Cana brava (Guadua angustifolia) bloomed for the first time in recorded history in 1971, suggesting a blooming interval well in excess of 130 years. The lack of environmental impact on the time of flowering indicates the presence of some sort of "alarm clock" in each cell of the plant which signals the diversion of all energy to flower production and the cessation of vegetative growth. This mechanism, as well as the evolutionary cause behind it, is still largely a mystery.

=== Invasive species ===
Because of their ability to rapidly populate and grow, some bamboo species are acknowledged as having high potential for becoming invasive species. A study commissioned by International Bamboo and Rattan Organization, found that invasive species typically are varieties that spread via rhizomes rather than by clumping, as most commercially viable woody bamboos do. In the United States, the National Invasive Species Information Center agency of the Department of Agriculture has golden bamboo (Phyllostachys aurea) listed as an invasive species. Other potentially invasive species include, but are not limited to, Actinocladum verticillatum, Bambusa tuldoides, Bambusa vulgaris, Guadua sarcocarpa, Guadua tagoara, Phyllostachys aurea, and Phyllostachys pubescens, all of which spread primarily through rhizomes. The harmful effects of these species include raising the pH of the soil, cramping and shading out native plants, hindering the spread of native seeds, altering food chains, and siphoning nutrients from other plants. As bamboo farming and cultivation become more prominent in modern agriculture, it is important to closely monitor the spread of potentially invasive bamboo species.

=== Animal diet ===
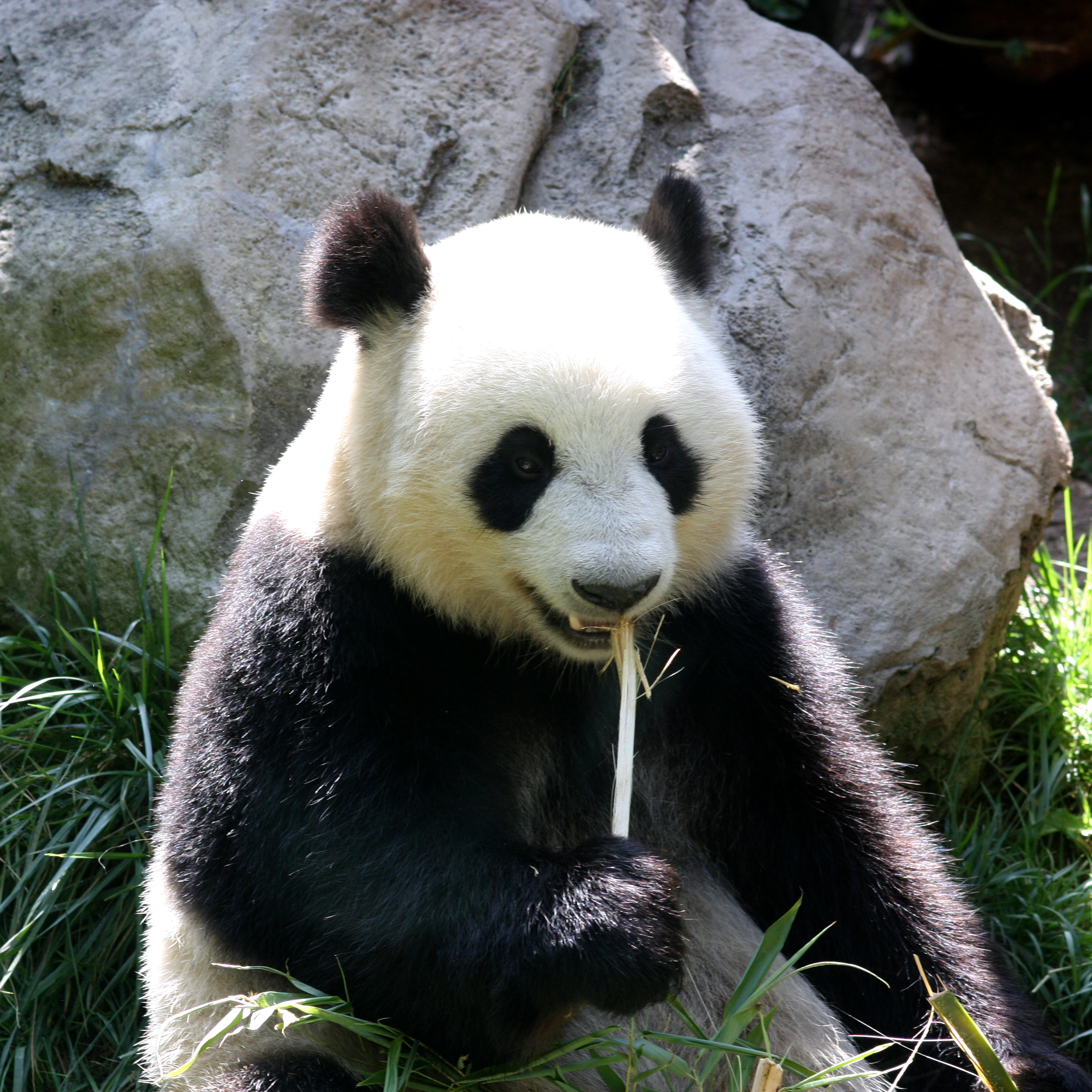
Bamboo is the main food of the giant panda, making up about 99% of its diet.

Bamboo contains large amounts of protein and very low amounts of carbohydrates allowing this plant to be the source of food for many animals. Soft bamboo shoots, stems and leaves are the major food source of the giant panda of China, the red panda of Nepal, and the bamboo lemurs of Madagascar. The red panda can eat up to 9 pounds (4.1 kg) a day which is also about the full body weight of the animal. With raw bamboo containing trace amounts of harmful cyanide with higher concentrations in bamboo shoots, the golden bamboo lemur ingests many times the quantity of the taxiphyllin-containing bamboo that would be lethal to a human.

Mountain gorillas of Central Africa also feed on bamboo, and have been documented consuming bamboo sap which was fermented and alcoholic; chimpanzees and elephants of the region also eat the stalks. The larvae of the bamboo borer (the moth Omphisa fuscidentalis) of Laos, Myanmar, Thailand and Yunnan, China feed off the pulp of live bamboo. In turn, these caterpillars are considered a local delicacy. Bamboo is also used for livestock feed with research showing some bamboo varieties have higher protein content over other varieties of bamboo.

== Cultivation ==
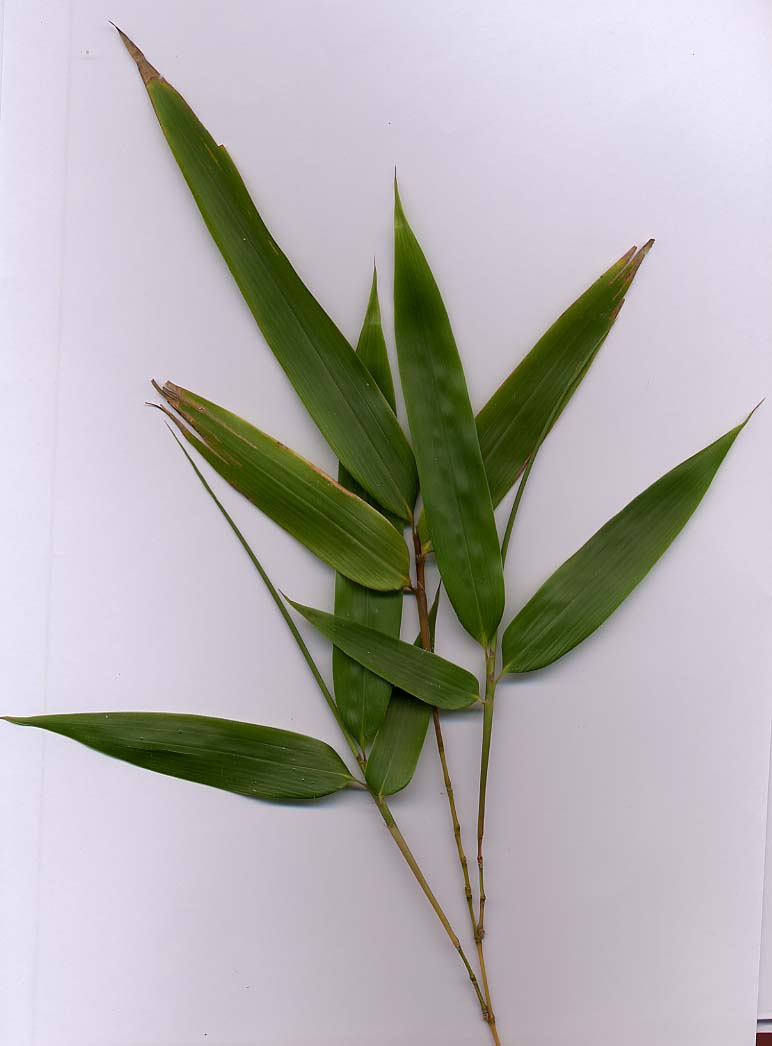
Bamboo foliage with yellow stems (probably Phyllostachys aurea)

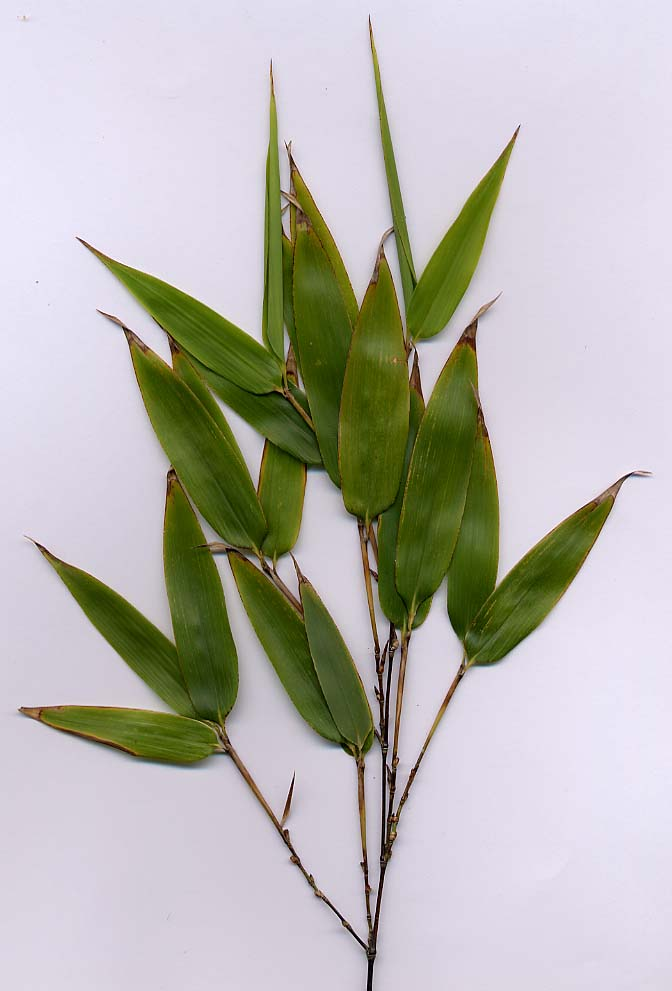
Bamboo foliage with black stems (probably Phyllostachys nigra)

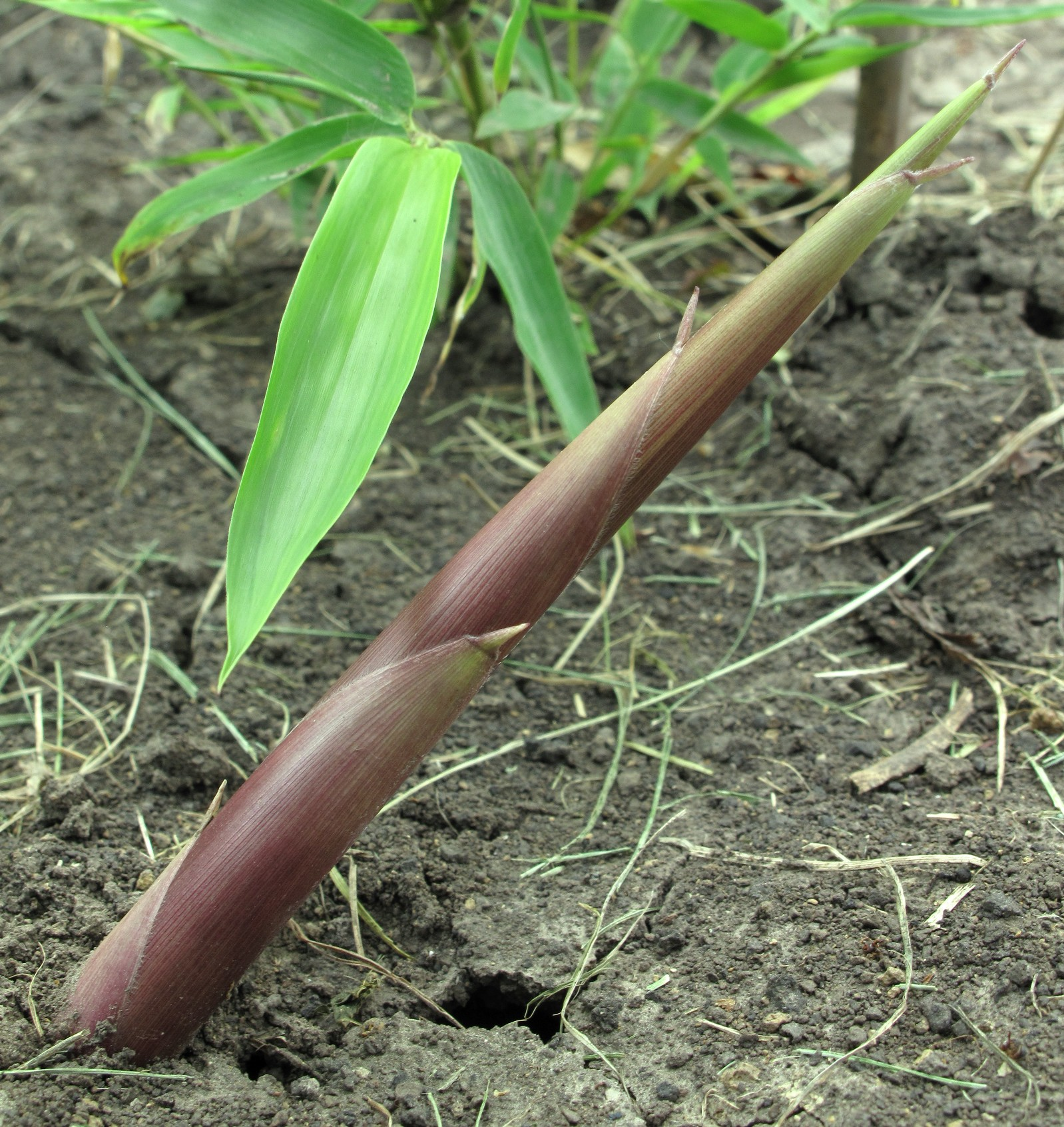
A young bamboo shoot (Phyllostachys parvifolia)

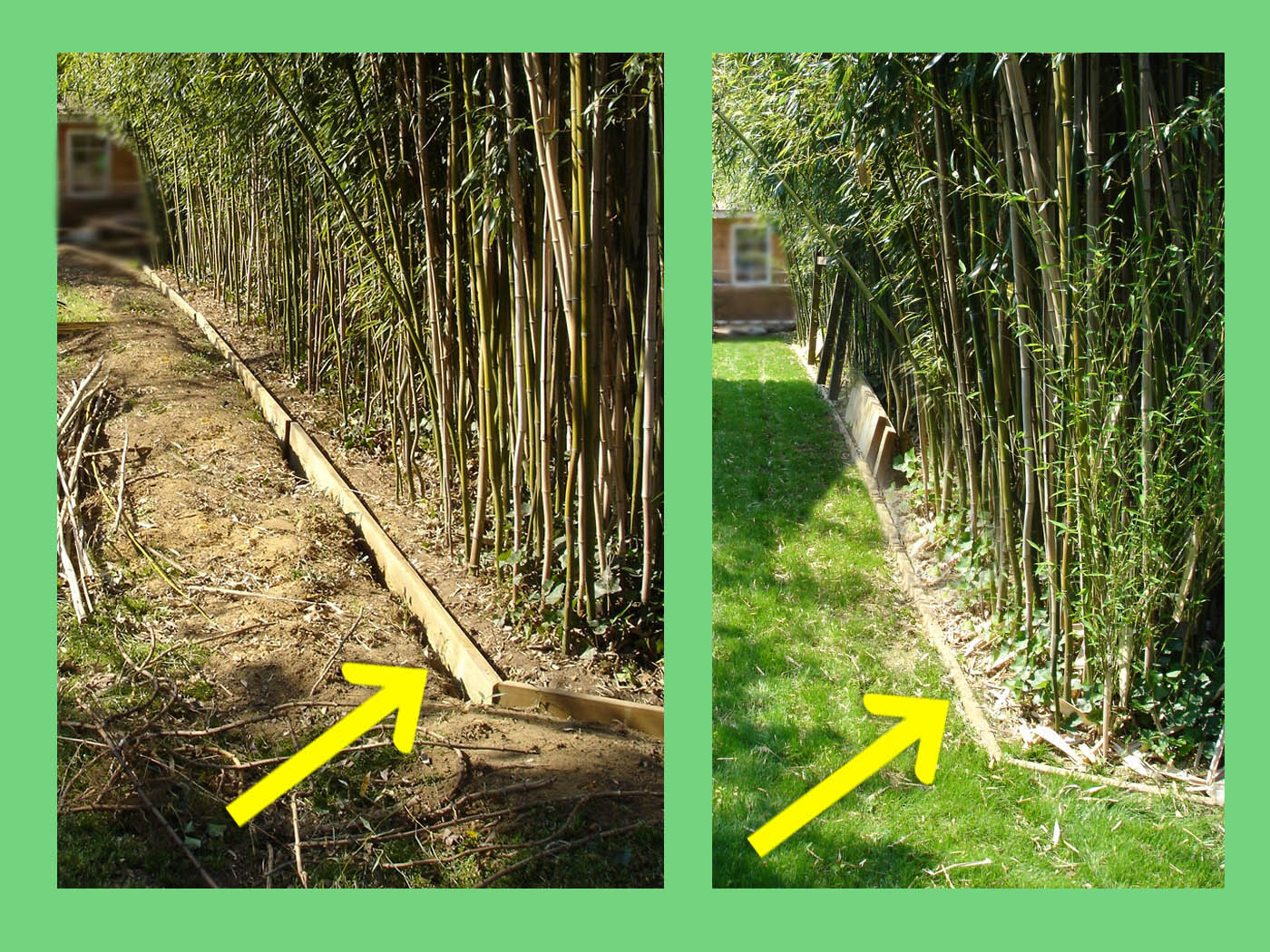
A bamboo hedge contained by an in-ground barrier, shown during and after construction

=== General ===
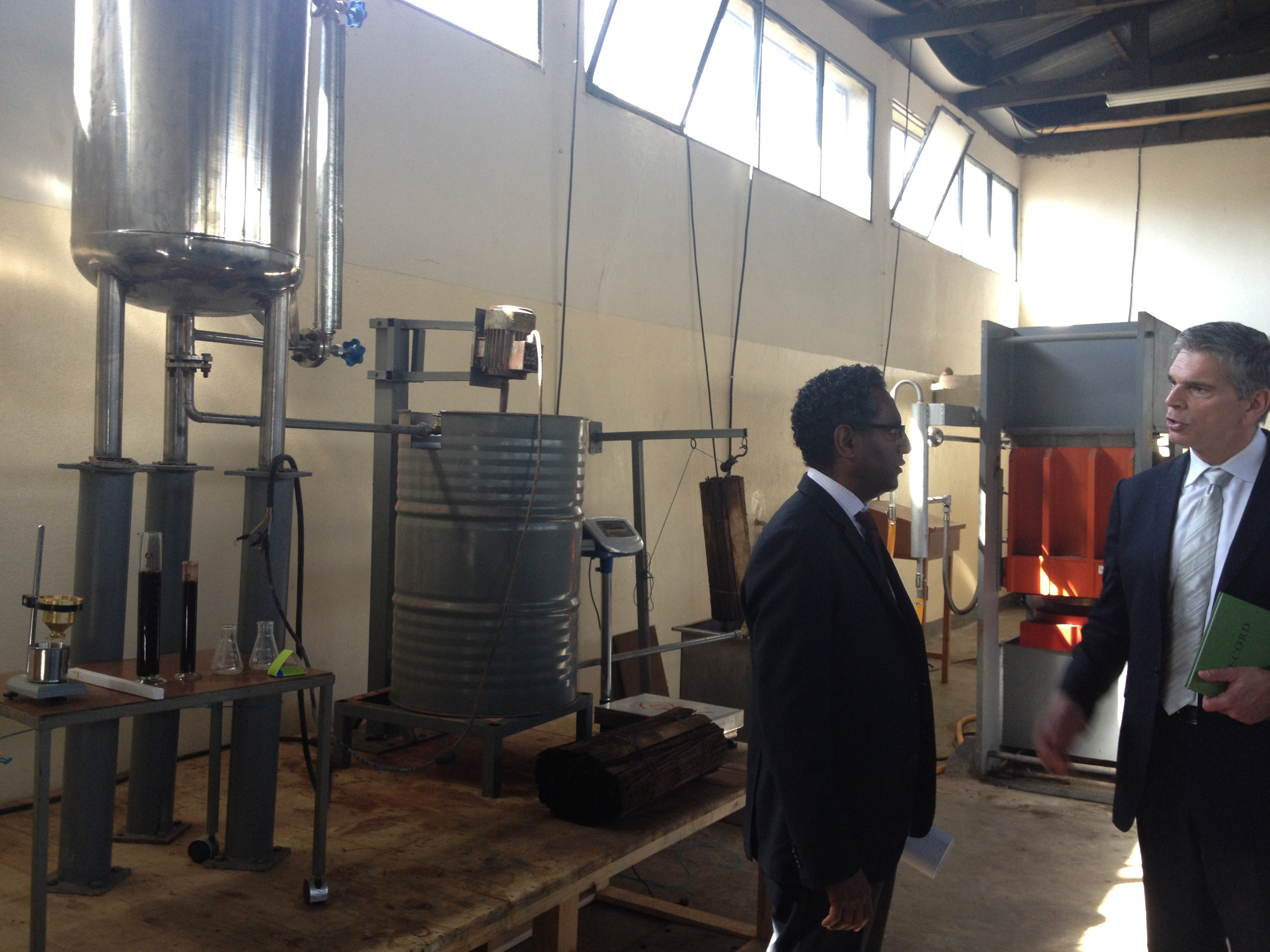
African Bamboo Product Innovation Lab where bamboo farming techniques and industrial uses are tested inside the company's facility in Addis Ababa, Ethiopia

Bamboo forestry (also known as bamboo farming, cultivation, agriculture or agroforestry) is a cultivation and raw material industry that provides the raw materials for the broader bamboo industry, worth over 72 billion dollars globally in 2019.

Historically a dominant raw material in South and South East Asia, the global bamboo industry has significantly grown in recent decades in part because of the high sustainability of bamboo as compared to other biomass cultivation strategies, such as traditional timber forestry. For example, as of 2016, the U.S. Fiber corporation Resource Fiber is contracting farmers in the United States for bamboo cultivation. Or in 2009, United Nations Industrial Development Organization published guidelines for cultivation of bamboo in semi-arid climates in Ethiopia and Kenya.

Because bamboo can grow on otherwise marginal land, bamboo can be profitably cultivated in many degraded lands. Moreover, because of the rapid growth, bamboo is an effective climate change mitigation and carbon sequestration crop, absorbing between 100 and 400 tonnes of carbon per hectare (40–160 tonnes per acre). In 1997, an international intergovernmental organization was established to promote the development of bamboo cultivation, the International Bamboo and Rattan Organisation.

Bamboo is harvested from both cultivated and wild stands, and some of the larger bamboos, particularly species in the genus Phyllostachys, are known as "timber bamboos". Bamboo is typically harvested as a source material for construction, food, crafts and other manufactured goods.

Bamboo cultivation in South, South East Asia and East Asia stretches back thousands of years. One practice, in South Korea, has been designated as a Globally Important Agricultural Heritage Systems.

In Brazil, the Brazilian Center for Innovation and Sustainability - CEBIS, a non-profit organization, promotes the development of Brazil's bamboo production chain. Last year, it helped with the approval of law n~21,162 in the state of Paraná, which encourages Bamboo Culture aiming at the dissemination of its agricultural cultivation and the valorization of bamboo as an instrument for promoting the sustainable socioeconomic development of the State through its multiple functionalities. Bamboo cultivation neutralizes carbon emissions. Bamboo cultivation is cheap and in addition to adding value to its production chain, it is a sustainable crop that brings environmental, economic and social benefits. Its production can be used from construction to food. Recently, it was qualified and classified for the National Commission for Sustainable Development Objectives - CNDOS of the Presidency of the Republic of the federal government of Brazil.

=== Harvesting ===
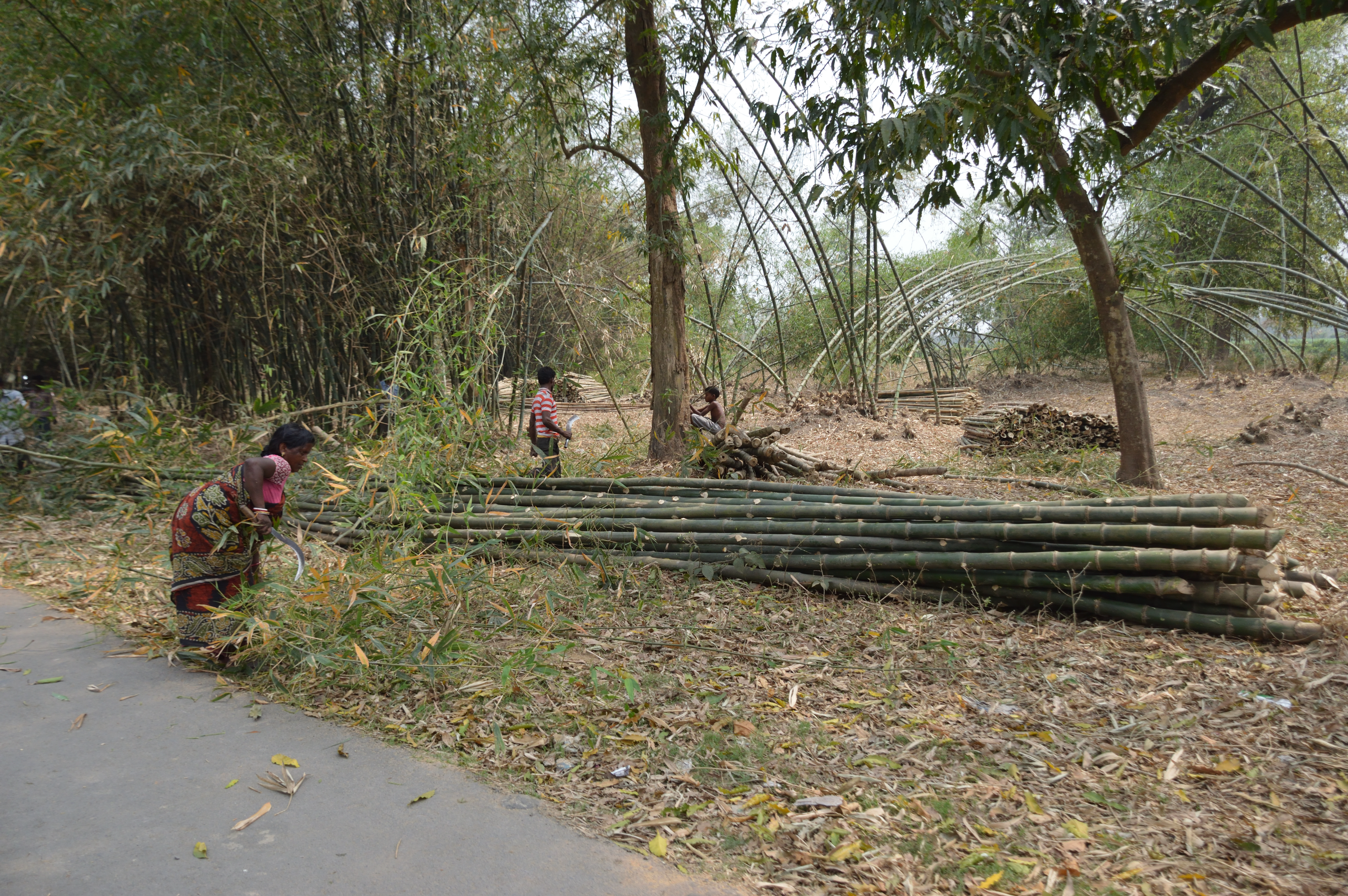
Bamboo harvested at Murshidabad

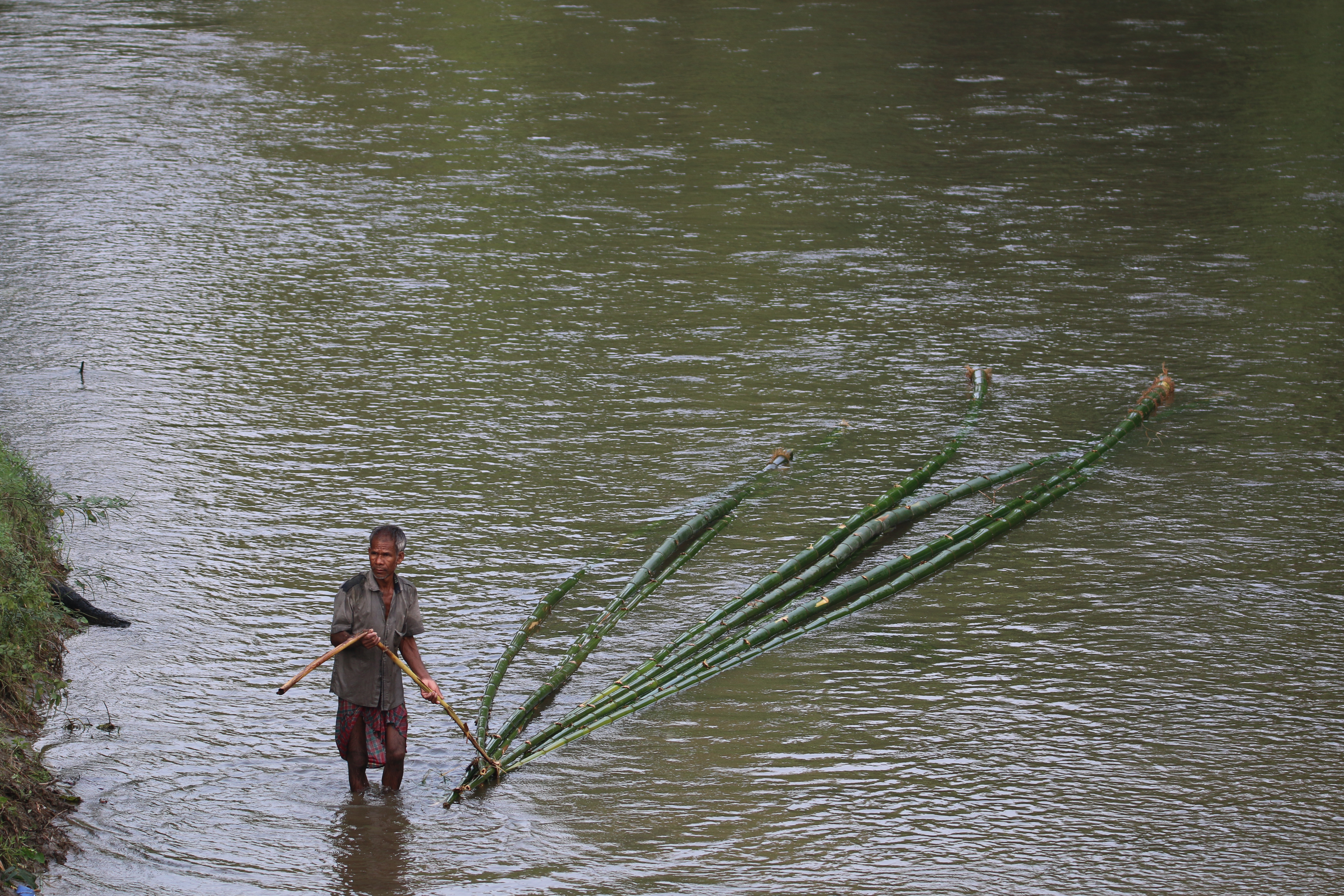
Harvested bamboo transported by river near Ramsai, Jalpaiguri

Bamboo used for construction purposes must be harvested when the culms reach their greatest strength and when sugar levels in the sap are at their lowest, as high sugar content increases the ease and rate of pest infestation. As compared to forest trees, bamboo species grow fast. Bamboo plantations can be readily harvested for a shorter period than tree plantations.

Harvesting of bamboo is typically undertaken according to these cycles:

- Lifecycle of the culm: As each individual culm goes through a five to seven-year lifecycle, they are ideally allowed to reach this level of maturity prior to full capacity harvesting. The clearing out or thinning of culms, particularly older decaying culms, helps to ensure adequate light and resources for new growth. Well-maintained clumps may have a productivity three to four times that of an unharvested wild clump. Consistent with the lifecycle described above, bamboo is harvested from two to three years through to five to seven years, depending on the species.
- Annual cycle: Most growth of new bamboo occurs during the wet season and disturbing the clump during this phase will potentially damage the upcoming crop, while harvesting immediately prior to the wet/growth season may also damage new shoots, therefore harvesting is best a few months prior to the start of the wet season. Also during this high-rainfall period, sap levels are at their highest, and then diminish towards the dry season.
- Daily cycle: During the height of the day, photosynthesis is at its peak, producing the highest levels of sugar in sap, making this the least ideal time of day to harvest and many traditional practitioners believe the best time to harvest is at dawn or dusk on a waning moon.

=== Leaching ===
Leaching is the removal of sap after harvest. In many areas of the world, the sap levels in harvested bamboo are reduced either through leaching or post-harvest photosynthesis. For example:

- Cut bamboo is raised clear of the ground and leaned against the rest of the clump for one to two weeks until leaves turn yellow to allow full consumption of sugars by the plant.
- A similar method is undertaken, but with the base of the culm standing in fresh water, either in a large drum or stream to leach out sap.
- Cut culms are immersed in a running stream and weighted down for three to four weeks.
- Water is pumped through the freshly cut culms, forcing out the sap (this method is often used in conjunction with the injection of some form of treatment).

In the process of water leaching, the bamboo is dried slowly and evenly in the shade to avoid cracking in the outer skin of the bamboo, thereby reducing opportunities for pest infestation.

Durability of bamboo in construction is directly related to how well it is handled from the moment of planting through harvesting, transportation, storage, design, construction, and maintenance. Bamboo harvested at the correct time of year and then exposed to ground contact or rain will break down just as quickly as incorrectly harvested material.

== Toxicity ==
Gardeners working with bamboo plants have occasionally reported allergic reactions varying from no effects during previous exposures, to immediate itchiness and rash developing into red welts after several hours where the skin had been in contact with the plant (contact allergy), and in some cases into swollen eyelids and breathing difficulties (dyspnea). A skin prick test using bamboo extract was positive for the immunoglobulin E (IgE) in an available case study.

In addition, the shoots (newly emerged culms) of bamboo contain the toxin taxiphyllin (a cyanogenic glycoside), which produces cyanide in the gut. Taxiphyllin levels are highest in young shoots. The level of the toxicant declines with the advancement of maturity. Proper cooking (boiling / steaming for a minimum of 20 minutes with several changes of water) breaks down the glycoside and releases hydrogen cyanide gas. Ultimately, this renders the shoots harmless. Bamboo shoots, eaten raw or undercooked, can cause symptoms of acute cyanide poisoning, including nausea, dizziness, rapid heartbeat, and in some cases coma or death, though this is rare with the traditional methods employed in Asian cuisines. Individuals with a sensitivity to cyanide, such as those with G6PD deficiency, should avoid them altogether, even when cooked.

Contact dermatitis due to bamboo leaves or culms appears to be immunoglobulin E-mediated in sensitized individuals, although specific allergens are unknown. Possible suspects include silica bodies, phenolic compounds or a fungal contaminant on the plant surface. As a result, gloves and long sleeves are typically recommended when using the herbicide. Moreover, topical corticosteroids or antihistamines may be applied to the skin if there is a mild reaction. In individuals sensitive to bamboo, the pollen can also occasionally cause respiratory allergies during the flowering season.

== Uses ==
=== Culinary ===
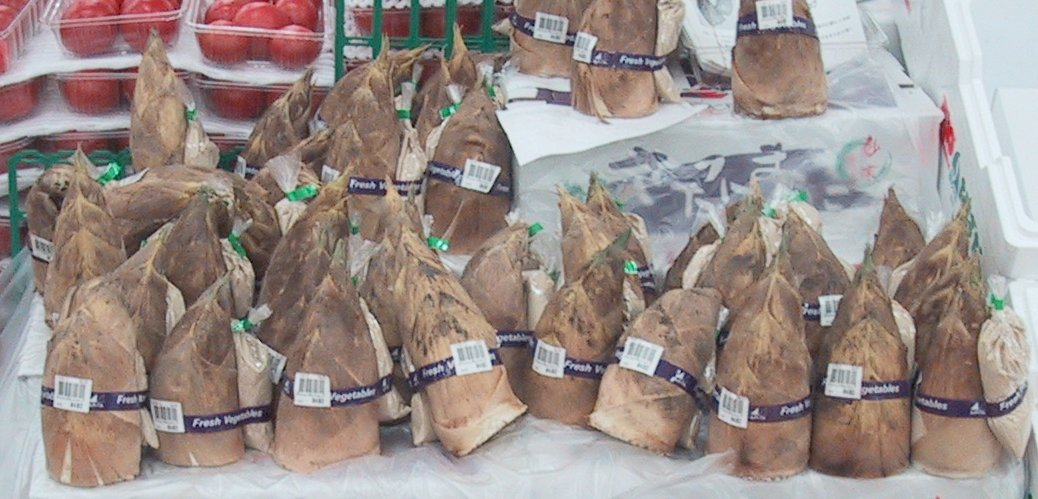
Unprocessed bamboo shoots in a Japanese market

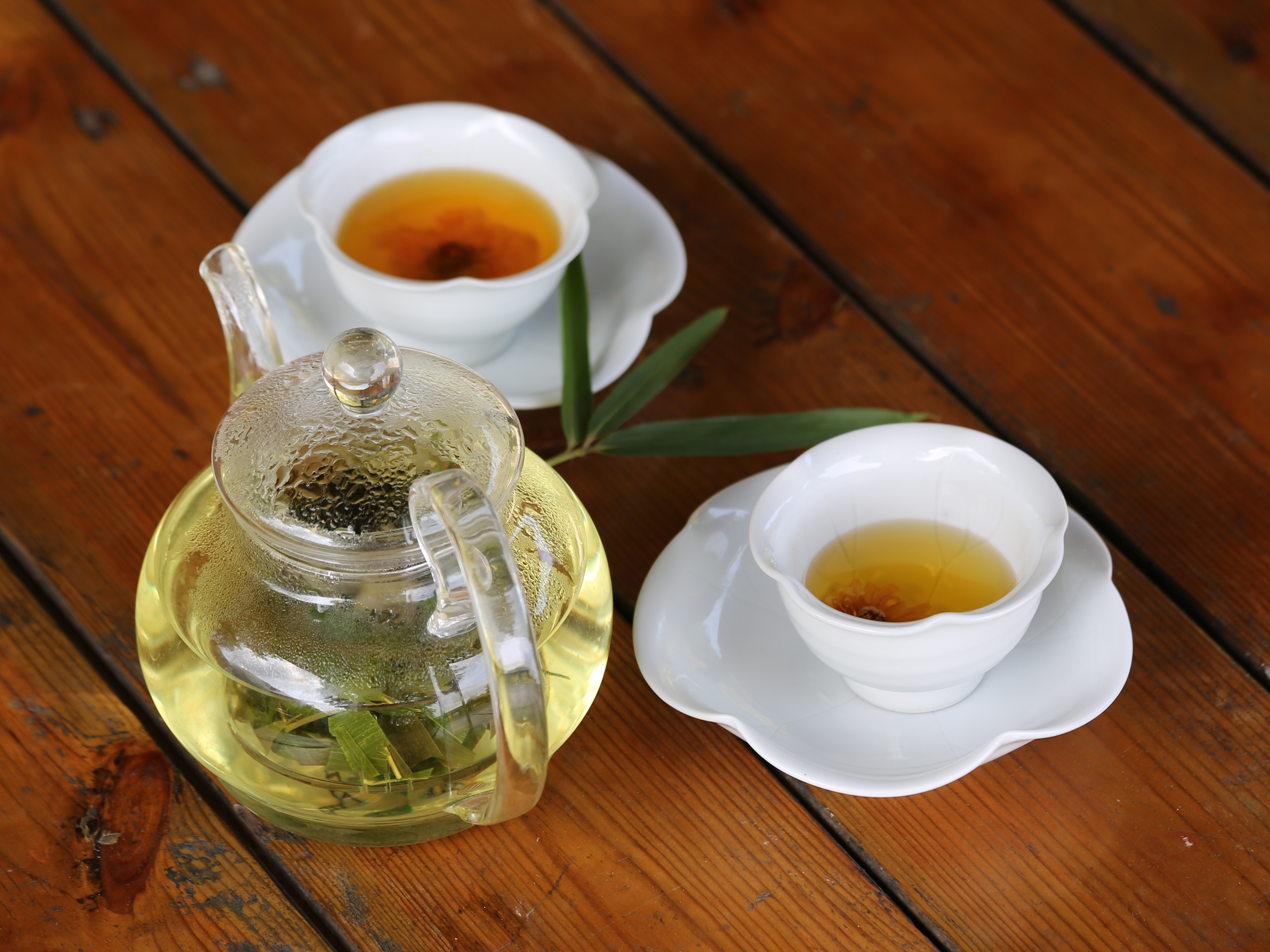
Korean bamboo tea

The shoots of most species are edible either raw or cooked, with the tough sheath removed. Cooking removes the slight bitterness. The shoots are used in numerous Asian dishes and broths, and are available in supermarkets in various sliced forms, in both fresh and canned versions.

The empty hollow in the stalks of larger bamboo is often used to cook food in many Asian cultures. Soups are boiled and rice is cooked in the hollows of fresh stalks of bamboo directly over a flame. Similarly, steamed tea is sometimes rammed into bamboo hollows to produce compressed forms of pu'er tea. Cooking food in bamboo is said to give the food a subtle but distinctive taste.

==== India ====
The bamboo shoot in its fermented state forms an important ingredient in cuisines across the Himalayas. In Assam, India, for example, it is called khorisa. In Nepal, a delicacy popular across ethnic boundaries consists of bamboo shoots fermented with turmeric and oil, and cooked with potatoes into a dish that usually accompanies rice (alu tama (आलु तामा) in Nepali).

In Sambalpur, India, the tender shoots are grated into juliennes and fermented to prepare kardi. The name is derived from the Sanskrit word for bamboo shoot, karira. This fermented bamboo shoot is used in various culinary preparations, notably amil, a sour vegetable soup. It is also made into pancakes using rice flour as a binding agent. The shoots that have turned a little fibrous are fermented, dried, and ground to sand-sized particles to prepare a garnish known as hendua. It is also cooked with tender pumpkin leaves to make sag green leaves.

The Indian state of Sikkim has promoted bamboo water bottles to keep the state free from plastic bottles.

In Konkani cuisine, the tender shoots (kirlu) are grated and cooked with crushed jackfruit seeds to prepare kirla sukke.

In southern India and some regions of southwest China, the seeds of the dying bamboo plant are consumed as a grain known as "bamboo rice". The taste of cooked bamboo seeds is reported to be similar to wheat and the appearance similar to rice, but bamboo seeds have been found to have lower nutrient levels than both. The seeds can be pulverized into a flour with which to make cakes.

==== Indonesia ====
In Indonesia, they are sliced thin and then boiled with santan (thick coconut milk) and spices to make a dish called gulai rebung. Other recipes using bamboo shoots are sayur lodeh (mixed vegetables in coconut milk) and lun pia (sometimes written lumpia: fried wrapped bamboo shoots with vegetables). The shoots of some species contain toxins that need to be leached or boiled out before they can be eaten safely.

Pickled bamboo, used as a condiment, may also be made from the pith of the young shoots.

==== China ====
The sap of young stalks tapped during the rainy season may be fermented to make ulanzi (a sweet wine) or made into a soft drink. Bamboo leaves are also used as wrappers for steamed dumplings which usually contain glutinous rice and other ingredients, such as the zongzi from China.

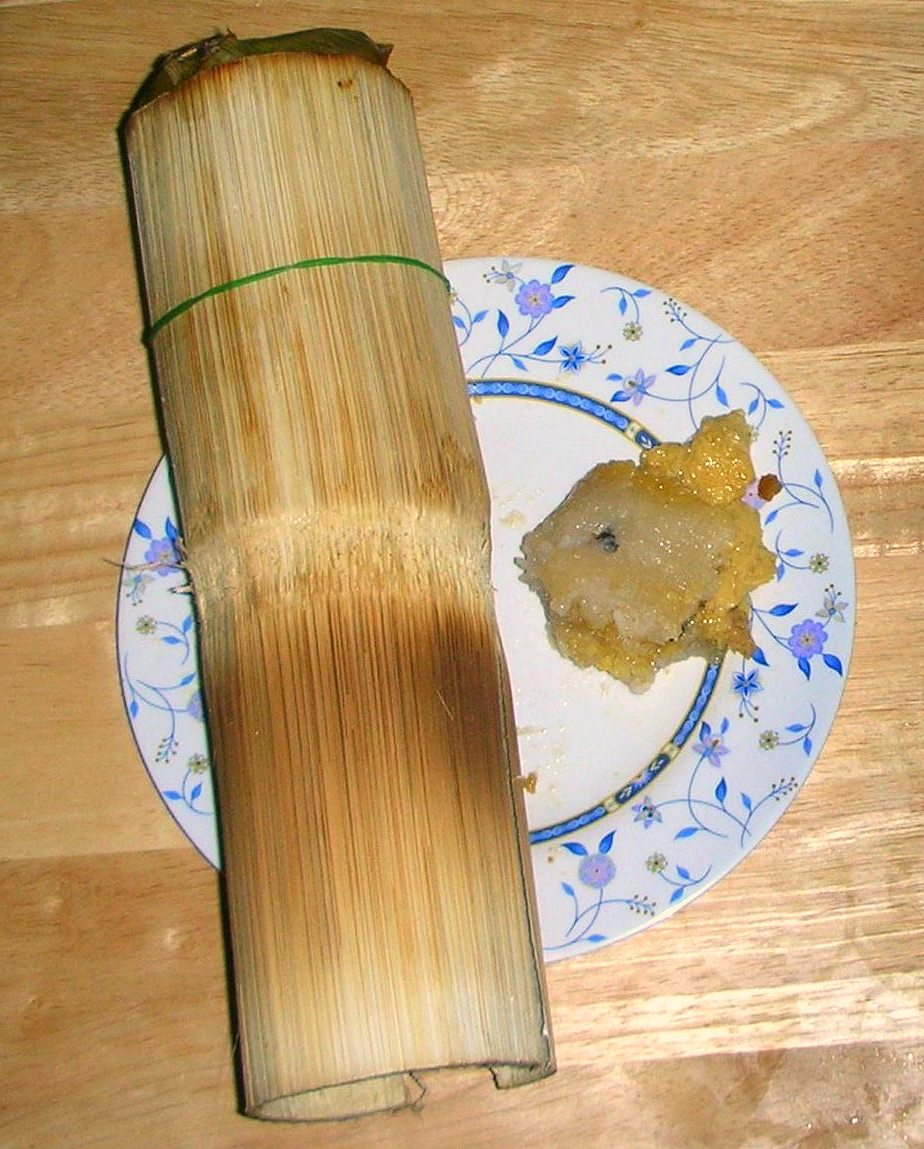
Khao lam (Thai: ข้าวหลาม) is glutinous rice with sugar and coconut cream cooked in specially prepared bamboo sections of different diameters and lengths.

==== Nepal ====
Pickled bamboo shoots (Nepali: तामा tama) are cooked with black-eyed beans as a delicacy in Nepal. Many Nepalese restaurants around the world serve this dish as Aloo tama. Fresh bamboo shoots are sliced and pickled with mustard seeds and turmeric and kept in a glass jar in direct sunlight for the best taste. It is used alongside many dried beans in cooking during winters. Baby shoots (Nepali: tusa) of a very different variety of bamboo (Nepali: निगालो Nigalo) native to Nepal is cooked as a curry in hilly regions.

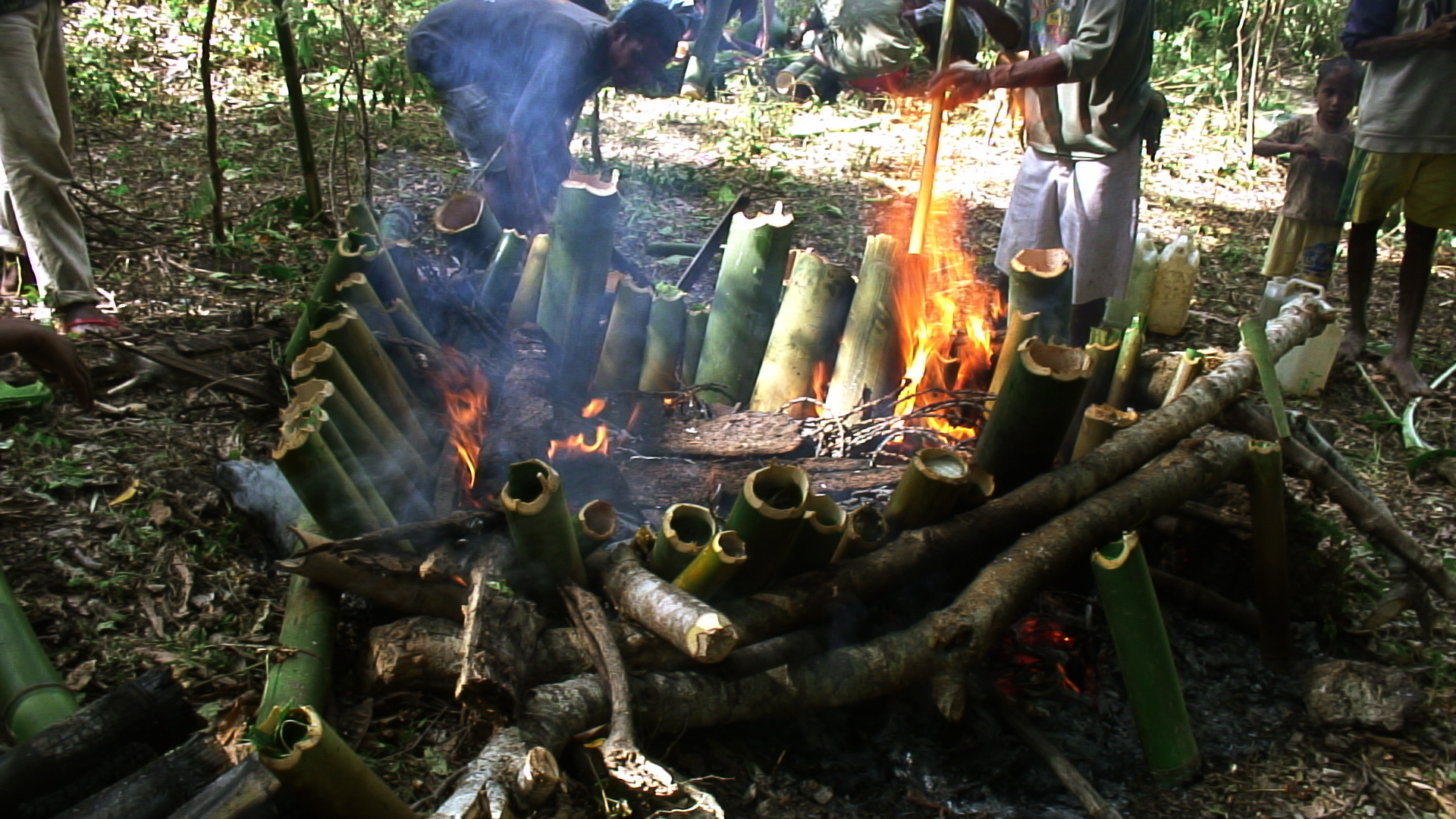
In East Timor, cooking food in bamboo is called tukir.

=== Fuel ===
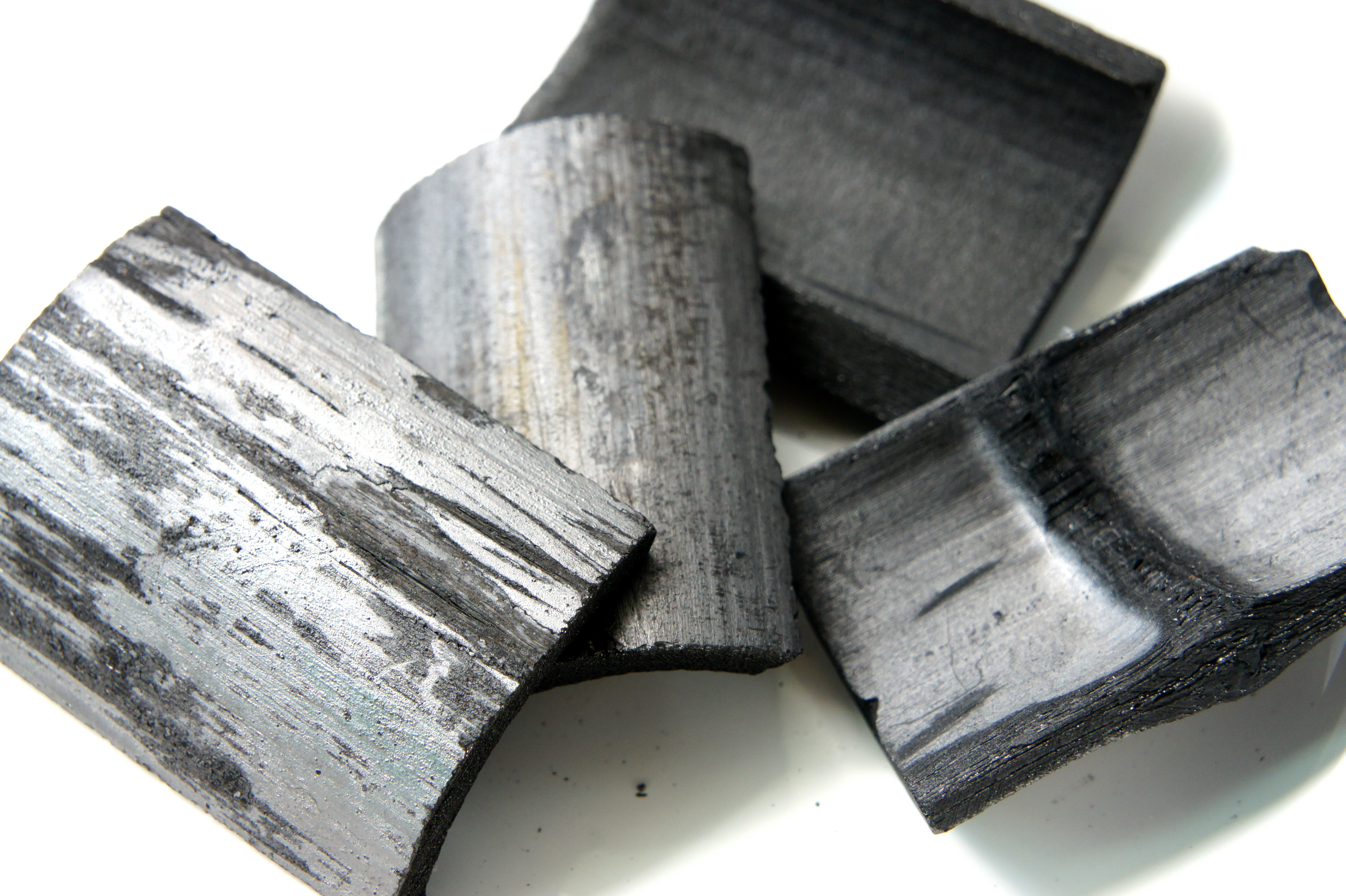
Bamboo charcoal

Bamboo charcoal is charcoal made from species of bamboo. It is typically made from the culms or refuse of mature bamboo plants and burned in ovens at temperatures ranging from 600 to 1,200 °C (1,100 to 2,200 °F). It is an especially porous charcoal, making it useful in the manufacture of activated carbon.

Bamboo charcoal has a long history of use in China, with documents dating as early as 1486 during the Ming dynasty in Chuzhou. There is also mention of it during the Qing dynasty, during the reigns of emperors Kangxi, Qianlong, and Guangxu.

=== Working ===
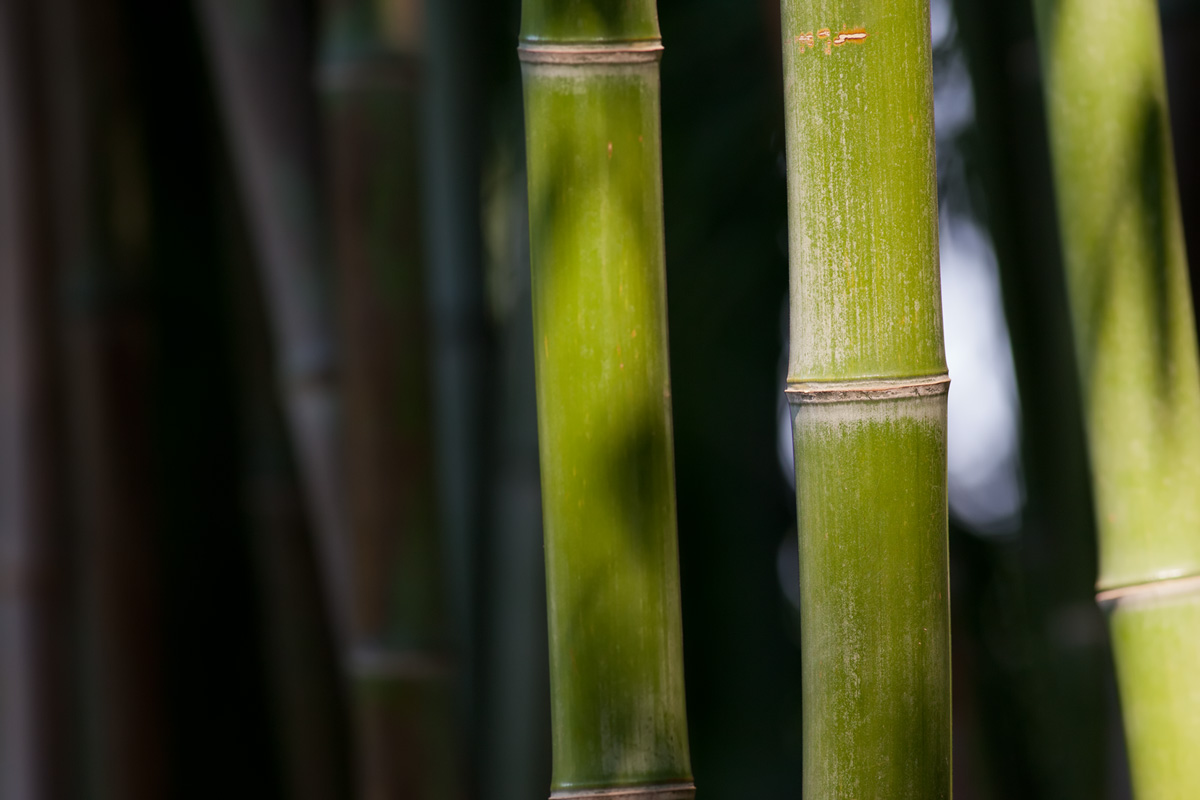
Bamboo

Bambooworking is the activity or skill of making items from bamboo, and includes architecture, carpentry, furniture and cabinetry, carving, joinery, and weaving. Its historical roots in Asia span cultures, civilizations, and millennia, and is found across East, South, and Southeast Asia.

==== Writing surface ====
Bamboo was in widespread use in early China as a medium for written documents. The earliest surviving examples of such documents, written in ink on string-bound bundles of bamboo strips (or "slips"), date from the fifth century BC during the Warring States period. References in earlier texts surviving on other media indicate some precursor of these Warring States period bamboo slips was used as early as the late Shang period (from about 1250 BC).

Bamboo or wooden strips were used as the standard writing material during the early Han dynasty, and excavated examples have been found in abundance. Subsequently, paper began to displace bamboo and wooden strips from mainstream uses, and by the fourth century AD, bamboo slips had been largely abandoned as a medium for writing in China.

Bamboo fiber has been used to make paper in China since early times. A high-quality, handmade bamboo paper is still produced in small quantities. Coarse bamboo paper is still used to make spirit money in many Chinese communities.

Bamboo pulps are mainly produced in China, Myanmar, Thailand, and India, and are used in printing and writing papers. Several paper industries are surviving on bamboo forests. Ballarpur Chandrapur, Maharashtra paper mills use bamboo for paper production. The most common bamboo species used for paper are Dendrocalamus asper and Bambusa blumeana. It is also possible to make dissolving pulp from bamboo. The average fiber length is similar to hardwoods, but the properties of bamboo pulp are closer to softwood pulps due to it having a very broad fiber length distribution. With the help of molecular tools, it is now possible to distinguish the superior fiber-yielding species/varieties even at juvenile stages of their growth, which can help in unadulterated merchandise production.

In Central India, there are regular bamboo working circles in forest areas of Maharashtra, Madhya Pradesh, Odisha and Chhattisgarh. Most of the bamboo is harvested for papermaking. Bamboo is cut after three years of its germination. No cutting is done during the rainy season (July–September); broken and malformed culms are harvested first.

==== Writing pen ====
In olden times, people in India used hand-made pens (known as Kalam or boru (बोरू)) made from thin bamboo sticks (with diameters of 5–10 mm and lengths of 100–150 mm) by simply peeling them on one side and making a nib-like pattern at the end. The pen would then be dipped in ink for writing.

==== Textiles ====
Since the fibers of bamboo are very short (less than 3 mm or 1/8 in), they are not usually transformed into yarn by a natural process. The usual process by which textiles labeled as being made of bamboo are produced uses only rayon made from the fibers with heavy employment of chemicals. To accomplish this, the fibers are broken down with chemicals and extruded through mechanical spinnerets; the chemicals include lye, carbon disulfide, and strong acids. Retailers have sold both end products as "bamboo fabric" to cash in on bamboo's current ecofriendly cachet. The Canadian Competition Bureau and the US Federal Trade Commission, as of mid-2009, are cracking down on the practice of labeling bamboo rayon as natural bamboo fabric. Under the guidelines of both agencies, these products must be labeled as rayon with the optional qualifier "from bamboo".

===== Fabric =====
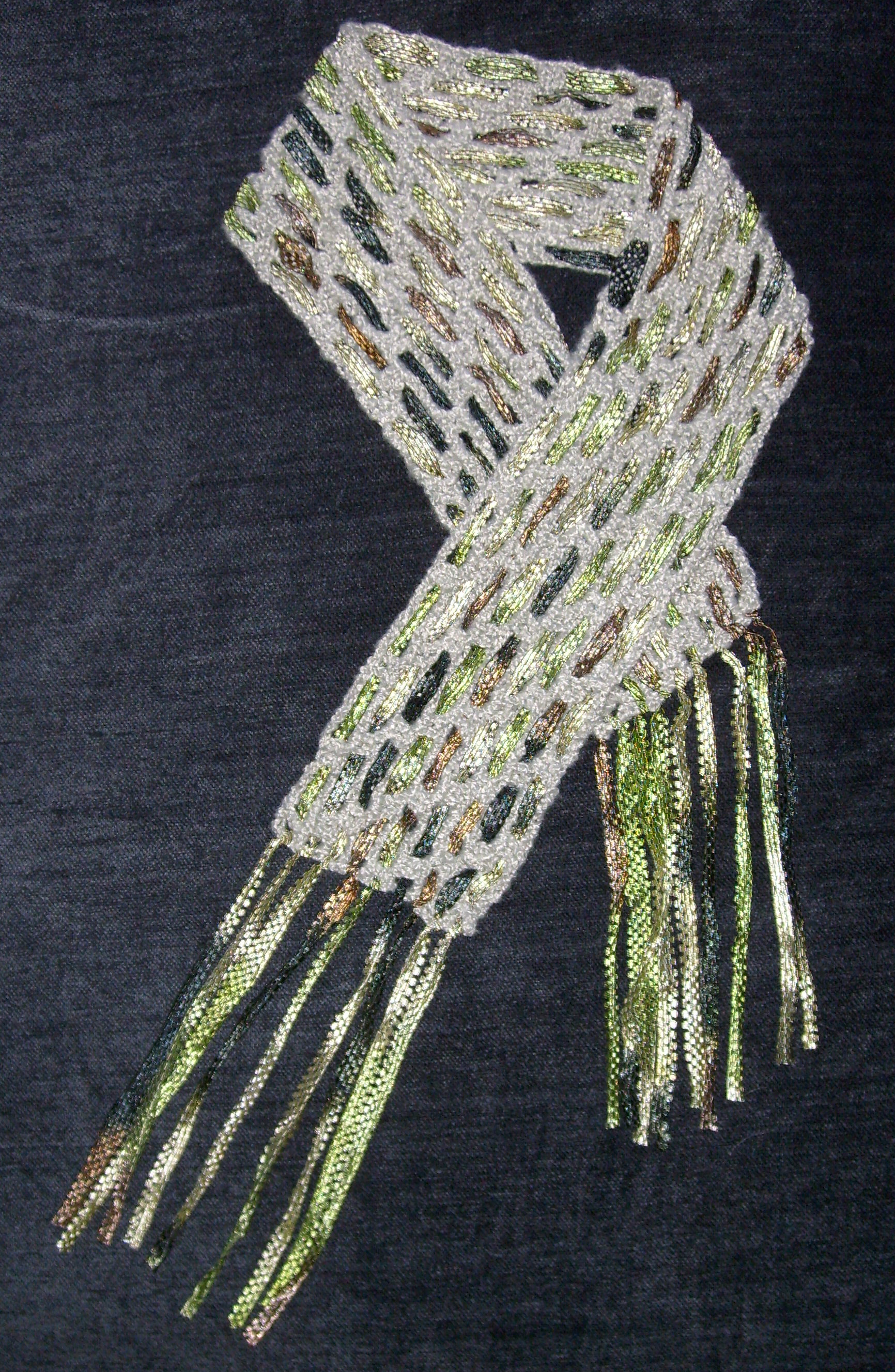
A scarf made of bamboo yarn and synthetic ribbon

Bamboo textile is any cloth, yarn or clothing made from bamboo fibres.

Modern textiles which claim to be made from bamboo are usually made from viscose rayon instead, a regenerated cellulose fibre using wood pulp as its raw material. Many jurisdictions prohibit labeling such products as bamboo unless they contain actual bamboo fiber. This process removes the natural characteristics of the raw material, rendering it identical to rayon from other cellulose sources.

==== Construction ====
Bamboo, like true wood, is a natural building material with a high strength-to-weight ratio useful for structures. In its natural form, bamboo as a construction material is traditionally associated with the cultures of South Asia, East Asia, and the South Pacific, to some extent in Central and South America, particularly in Colombia and Ecuador, and by extension in the aesthetic of Tiki culture.

In China and India, bamboo was used to hold up simple suspension bridges, either by making cables of split bamboo or twisting whole culms of sufficiently pliable bamboo together. One such bridge in the area of Qian-Xian is referenced in writings dating back to 960 AD and may have stood since as far back as the third century BC, due largely to continuous maintenance.

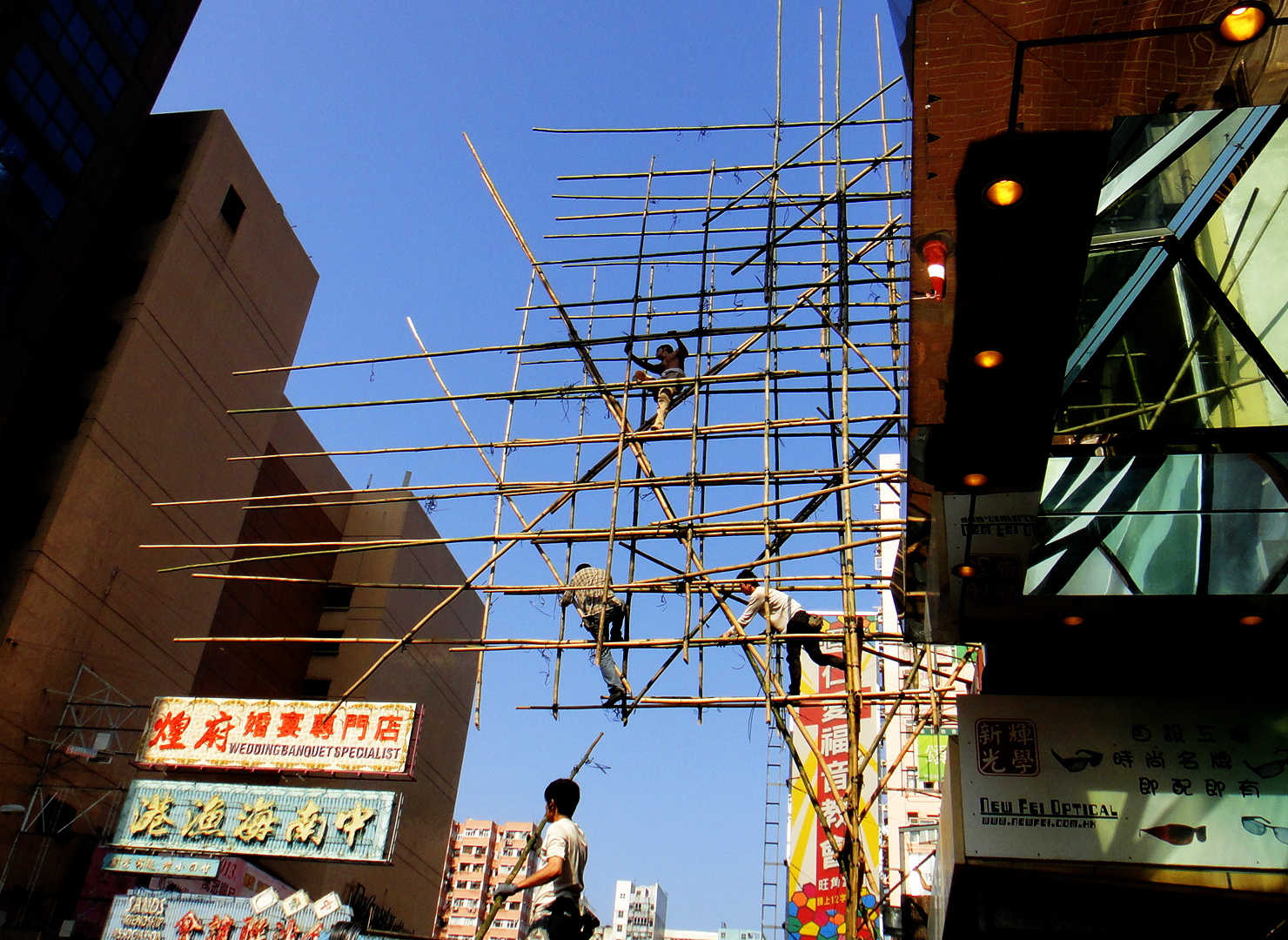
Bamboo has long been used as an assembly material in Hong Kong because of its versatility.

Bamboo has also long been used as scaffolding; the practice has been banned in China for buildings over six stories, but is still in continuous use for skyscrapers in Hong Kong.

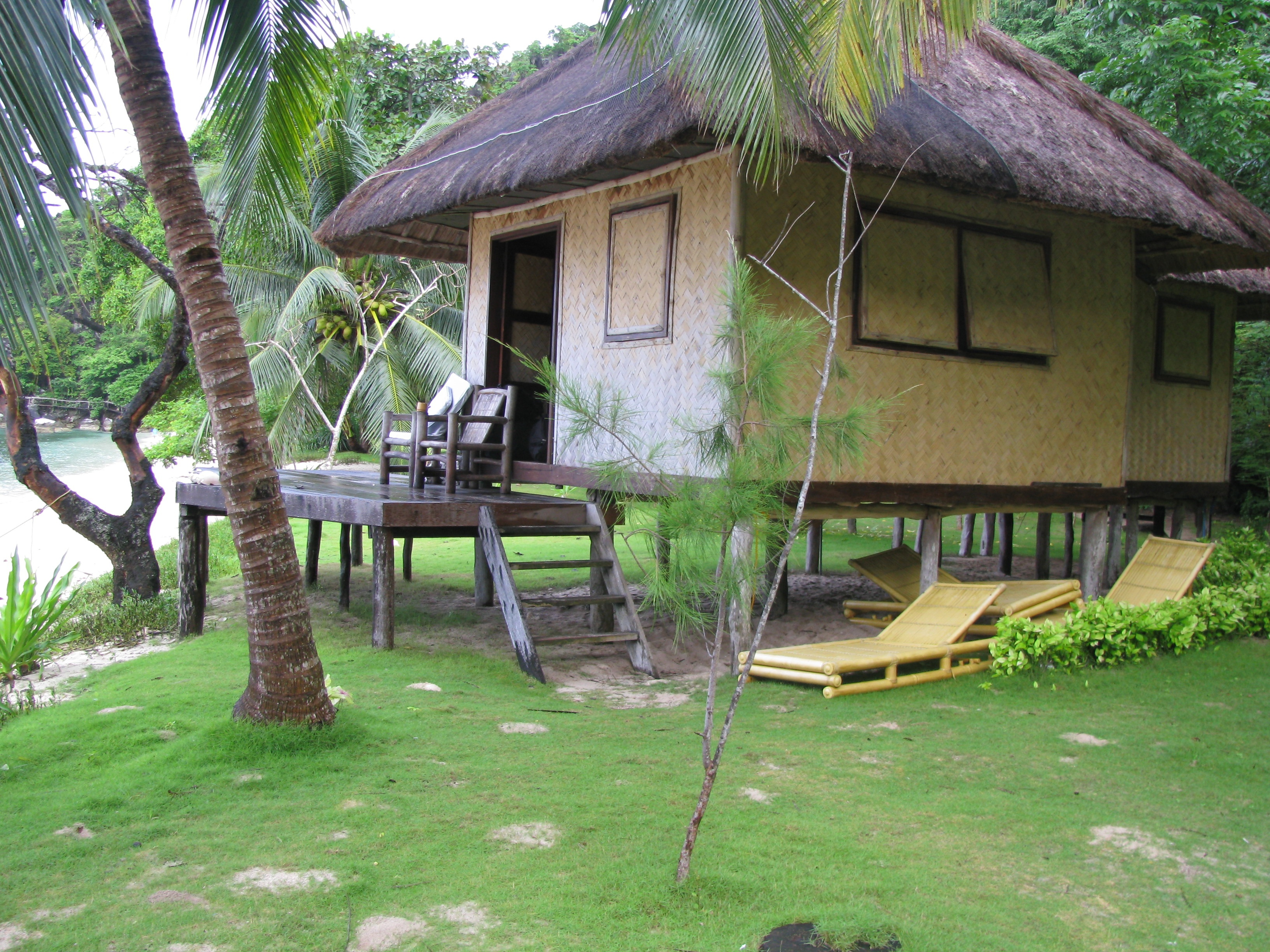
A modern resort guesthouse in Palawan, Philippines, with traditional woven bamboo walls (sawali)

In the Philippines, the nipa hut is a fairly typical example of the most basic sort of housing where bamboo is used; the walls are split and woven bamboo, and bamboo slats and poles may be used as its support.

In Japanese architecture, bamboo is used primarily as a supplemental or decorative element in buildings such as fencing, fountains, grates, and gutters, largely due to the ready abundance of quality timber.

Many ethnic groups in remote areas that have water access in Asia use bamboo that is 3–5 years old to make rafts. They use 8 to 12 poles, 6–7 m (20–23 ft) long, laid together side by side to a width of about 1 m (3 ft). Once the poles are lined up together, they cut a hole crosswise through the poles at each end and use a small bamboo pole pushed through that hole like a screw to hold all the long bamboo poles together. Floating houses use whole bamboo stalks tied together in a big bunch to support the house floating in the water.

==== Fishing and aquaculture ====
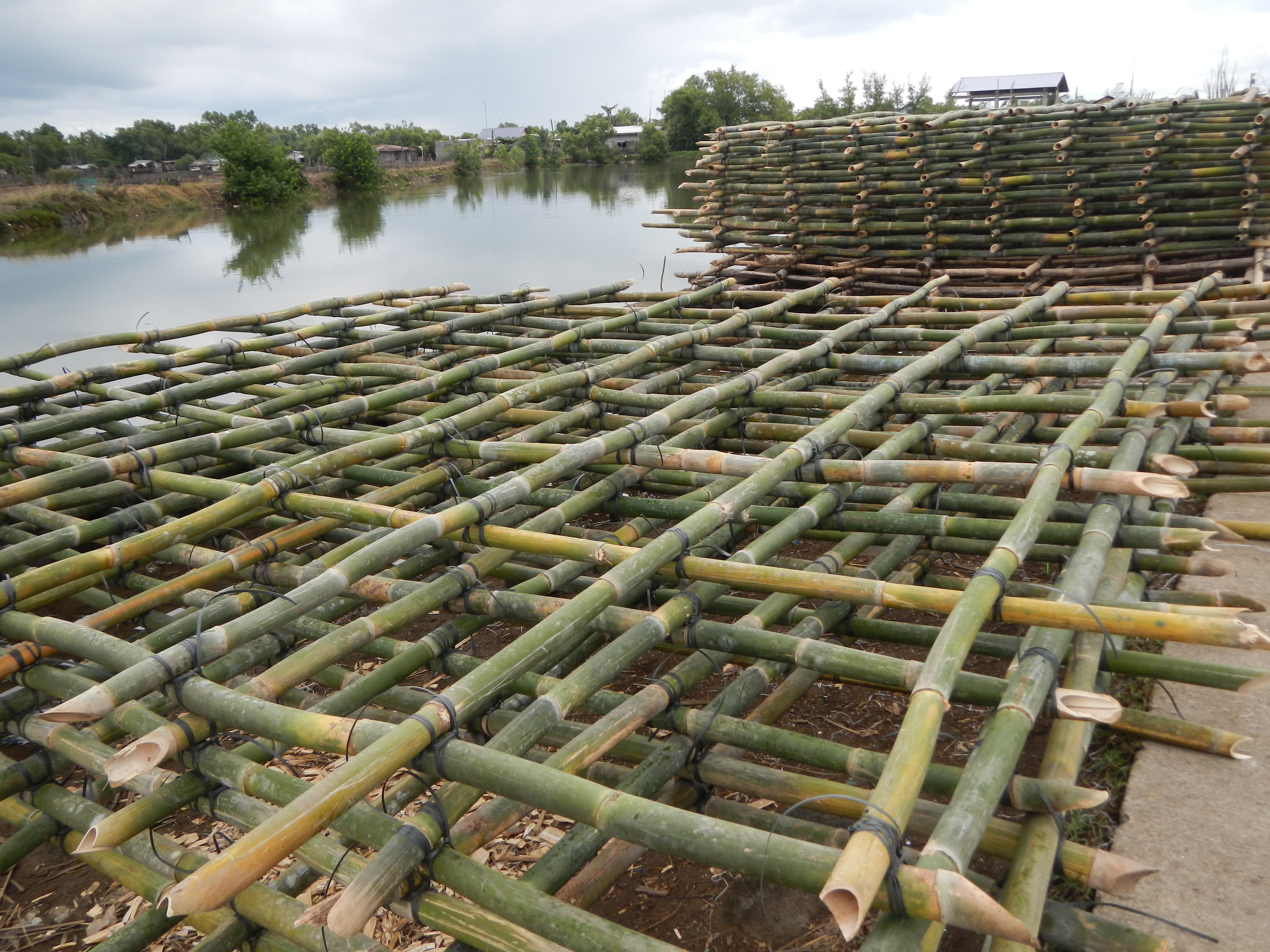
Bamboo trays used in mussel farming (Abucay, Bataan, Philippines)

Due to its flexibility, bamboo is also used to make fishing rods. The split cane rod is especially prized for fly fishing.

==== Firecrackers ====
Bamboo has been traditionally used in Malaysia and Indonesia as a firecracker called a meriam buluh or bamboo cannon. Four-foot-long sections of bamboo are cut, and a mixture of water and calcium carbide are introduced. The resulting acetylene gas is ignited with a stick, producing a loud bang.

==== Weapons ====
Bamboo has often been used to construct weapons and is still incorporated in several Asian martial arts.

- A bamboo staff, sometimes with one end sharpened, is used in the Tamil martial art of silambam, a word derived from a term meaning "hill bamboo".
- Staves used in the Indian martial art of gatka are commonly made from bamboo, a material favored for its light weight.
- A bamboo sword called a shinai is used in the Japanese martial art of kendo.
- Bamboo is used for crafting the bows, called yumi, and arrows used in the Japanese martial art kyūdō.
- The first gunpowder-based weapons, such as the fire lance, were made of bamboo.
- The Chinese Langxian, or "Wolf Brush Spear". Some variants of this weapon were merely long bamboo poles with a spearhead that still had layers of leaves attached. The Langxian was mainly used as a defensive weapon in Qi Jiguang's Mandarin Duck Formation.
- Sharpened bamboo javelins weighted with sand known as bagakay were used as disposable missile weapons in both land and naval warfare in the Philippines. They were thrown in groups at a time at enemy ships or massed enemy formations. Non-disposable finely crafted throwing spears made from bamboo weighted with sand known as sugob were also used. Sugob were mainly used for close-quarters combat and were only thrown when they could be retrieved.
- Metal-tipped blowgun-spear called sumpit (or sumpitan), used by various ethnic groups in the islands of the Philippines, Borneo, and Sulawesi, were generally made from hollowed bamboo. They used thick short darts dipped in the concentrated sap of Antiaris toxicaria which could cause lethal cardiac arrest.
- The simple sharpened bamboo spear, known as bambu runcing (literally 'sharp bamboo' or 'pointed bamboo'), is a legendary symbol of Indonesian revolutionary spirit, embodying the will of the Indonesian people, who were often ill-equipped, to fight for independence against the Dutch occupation who held air- and naval supremacy along with Commonwealth aid.
- Punji sticks are stakes of sharpened bamboo typically used in area denial and booby traps. Punji sticks were widely used in the Vietnam War by the Viet Cong.

==== Musical instruments ====
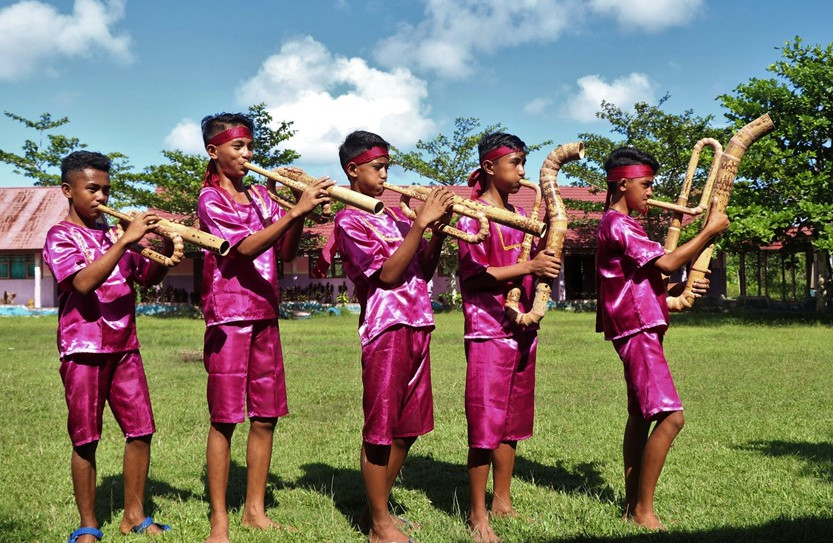
Wind instruments made of bamboo played by students in Talaud, North Sulawesi, Indonesia

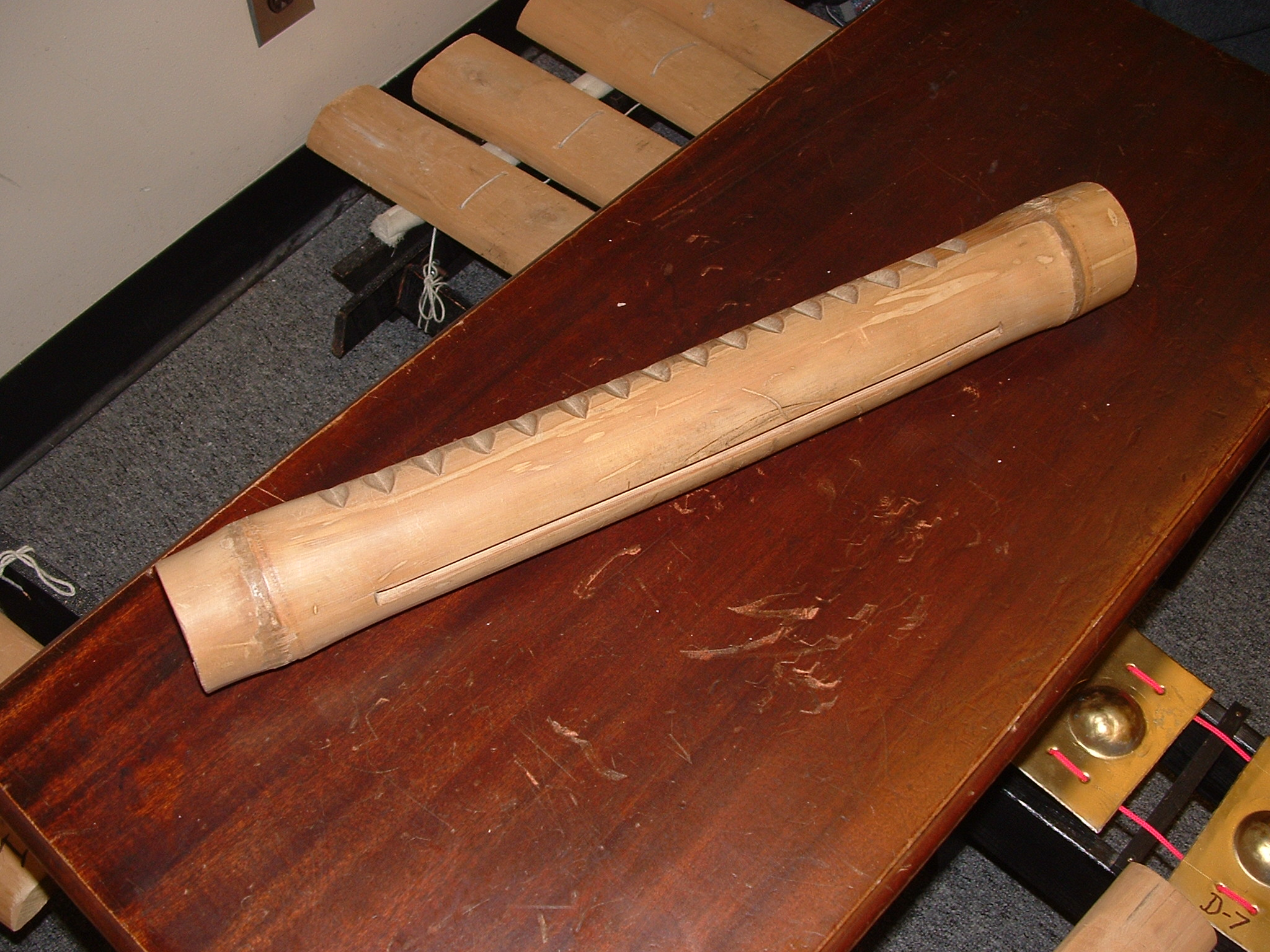
An example of a slit drum or scraper from the Philippines known as a kagul by the Maguindanaon people

Bamboo's natural hollow form makes it an obvious choice for many musical instruments. In South and South East Asia, traditional uses of bamboo the instrument include various types of woodwind instruments, such as flutes, and devices like xylophones and organs, which require resonating sections. In some traditional instruments bamboo is the primary material, while others combine bamboo with other materials such as wood and leather.

==== Indicator of climate change ====
The Song dynasty (960–1279 AD) Chinese scientist and polymath Shen Kuo (1031–1095) used the evidence of underground petrified bamboo found in the dry northern climate of Yan'an, Shanbei region, Shaanxi province to support his geological theory of gradual climate change.

==== Kitchenware and other usage ====
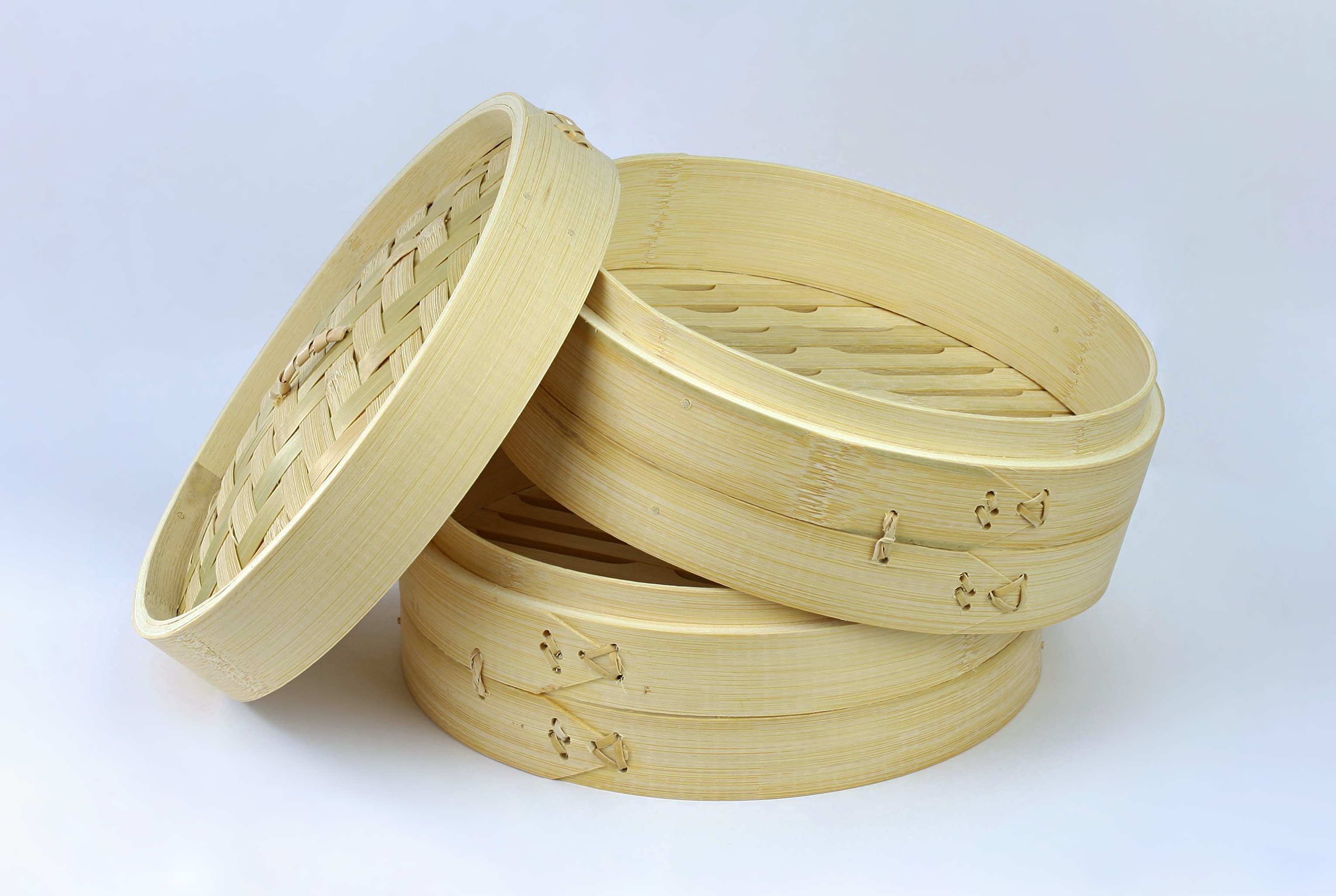
A bamboo steamer, used to cook foods like dim sum

Bamboo is frequently used for cooking utensils within many cultures, and is used in the manufacture of chopsticks and bamboo steamers. In modern times, some see bamboo tools as an eco-friendly alternative to other manufactured utensils because they are rapidly reproducible as the world's fastest growing plant. Bamboo is also used to make eating utensils such as chopsticks, trays, and tea scoops. A 2025 study that researched their use in dishes concluded that safety concerns persist in the "case of bio-based tableware marketed as 'natural.'"

Several manufacturers offer bamboo bicycles, surfboards, snowboards, and skateboards.

Bamboo has traditionally been used to make a wide range of everyday utensils and cutting boards, particularly in Japan, where archaeological excavations have uncovered bamboo baskets dating to the Late Jōmon period (2000–1000 BC). Bamboo also has a long history of use in Asian furniture. Chinese bamboo furniture is a distinct style based on a millennia-long tradition, and bamboo is also used for floors due to its high hardness.

Additionally, bamboo is used to create bracelets, earrings, necklaces, and other jewelry.

== In culture ==
Bamboo
- "Bamboo" in ancient seal script (top) and regular script (bottom) Chinese characters

Chinese name
- Chinese: 竹
Transcriptions
Standard Mandarin
- Hanyu Pinyin: zhú
- Wade–Giles: chu^{2}
- IPA: [ʈʂǔ]
Wu
- Romanization: tzoq
Yue: Cantonese
- Yale Romanization: jūk
- Jyutping: zuk1
- IPA: [tsʊk̚˥]
Southern Min
- Tâi-lô: tik

Vietnamese name
- Vietnamese alphabet: tre
- Chữ Nôm: 椥

Korean name
- Hangul: 대나무
Transcriptions
- Revised Romanization: daenamu

Japanese name
- Kanji: 竹
Transcriptions
- Romanization: take

Several Asian cultures, including that of the Andaman Islands, believe humanity emerged from a bamboo stem.

=== China ===
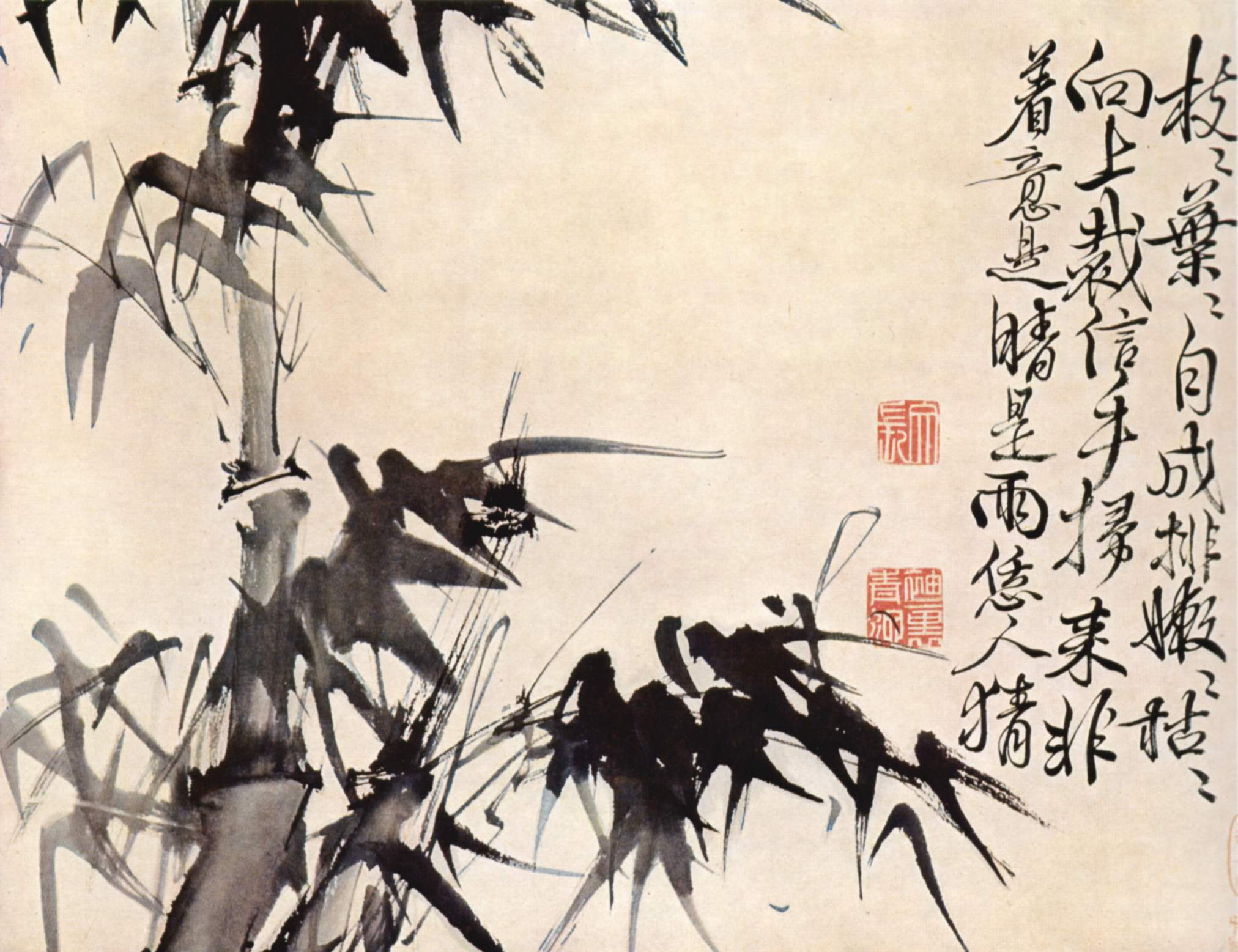
Bamboo, by Xu Wei, Ming Dynasty

Bamboo's long life makes it a Chinese symbol of uprightness and an Indian symbol of friendship. The rarity of its blossoming has led to the flowers' being regarded as a sign of impending famine. This may be due to rats feeding upon the profusion of flowers, then multiplying and destroying a large part of the local food supply. The most recent flowering began in May 2006 (see Mautam). Various bamboo species bloom in this manner about every 28–60 years.

In Chinese culture, the bamboo, plum blossom, orchid, and chrysanthemum (often known as méilánzhújú 梅蘭竹菊 in Chinese) are collectively referred to as the Four Gentlemen. These four plants also represent the four seasons and, in Confucian ideology, four aspects of the junzi ("prince" or "noble one"). The pine (sōng 松), the bamboo (zhú 竹), and the plum blossom (méi 梅) are also admired for their perseverance under harsh conditions, and are together known as the "Three Friends of Winter" (suìhán sānyǒu 歲寒三友) in Chinese culture.

==== Attributions of character ====
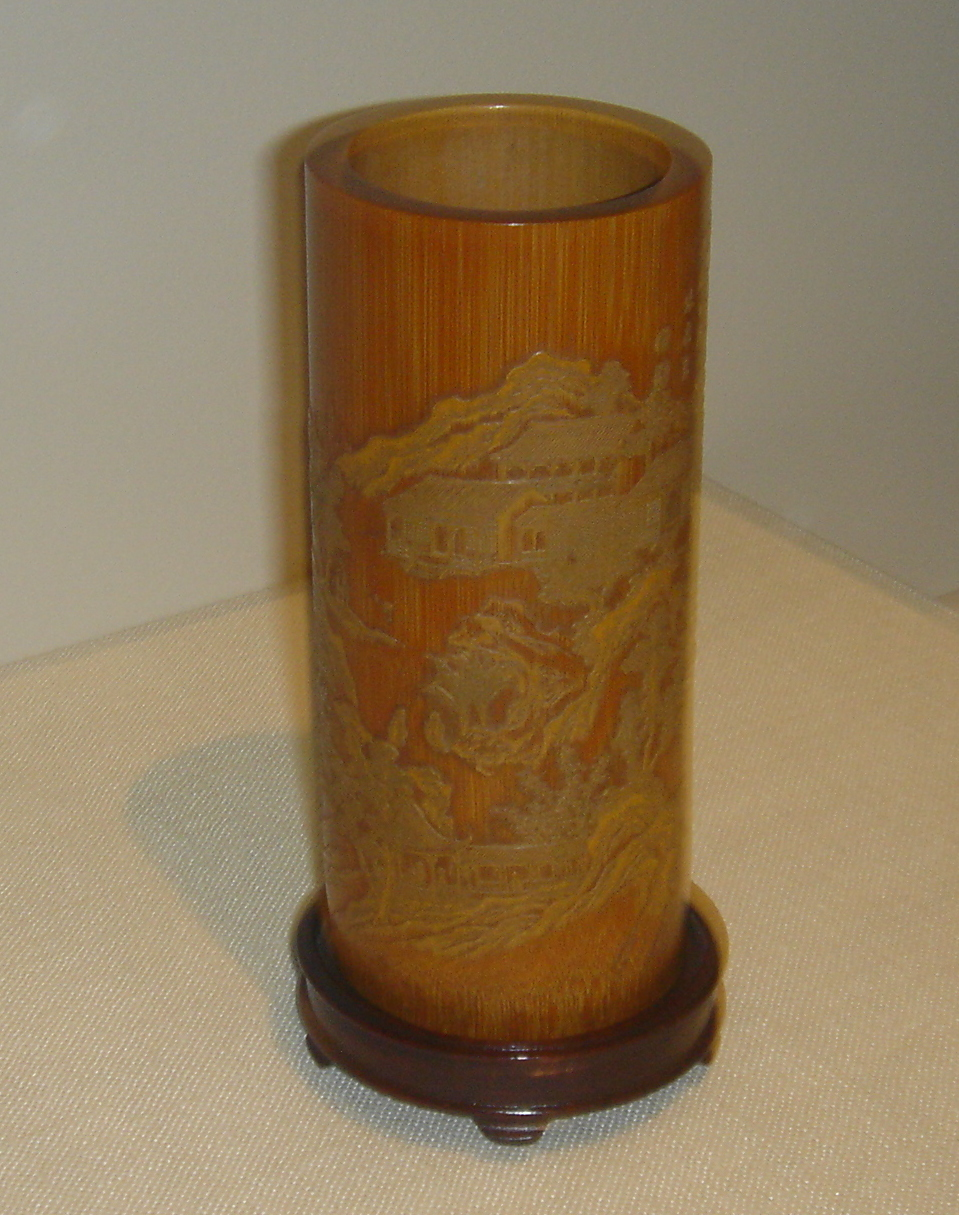
A cylindrical bamboo brush holder or holder of poems on scrolls, created by Zhang Xihuang in the 17th century, late Ming or early Qing Dynasty – in the calligraphy of Zhang's style, the poem Returning to My Farm in the Field by the fourth-century poet Tao Yuanming is incised on the holder.

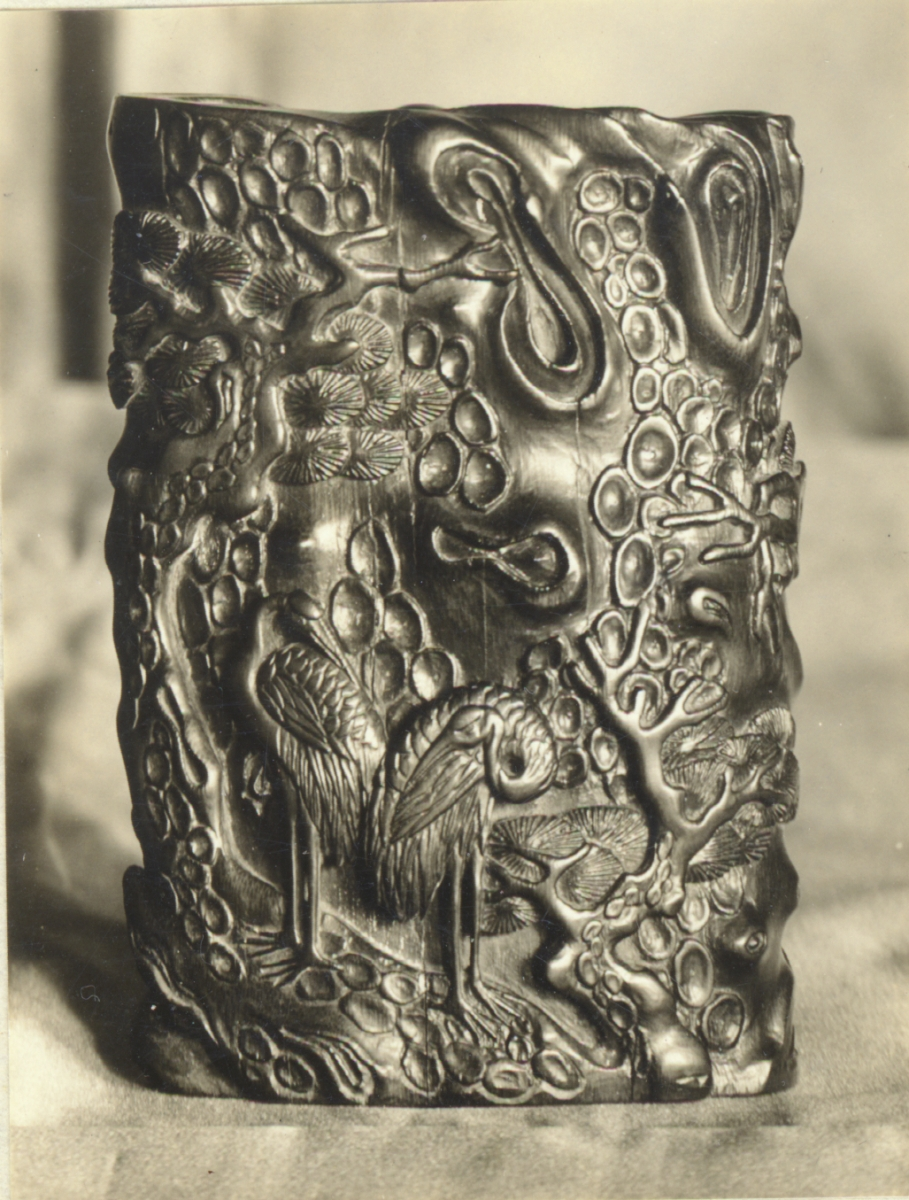
Photo of carved Chinese bamboo wall vase. 1918. Brooklyn Museum Archives, Goodyear Archival Collection.

Bamboo, one of the "Four Gentlemen" (bamboo, orchid, plum blossom and chrysanthemum), plays such an important role in traditional Chinese culture that it is even regarded as a behavior model of the gentleman. As bamboo has features such as uprightness, tenacity, and modesty, people endow bamboo with integrity, elegance, and plainness, though it is not physically strong. Countless poems praising bamboo written by ancient Chinese poets are actually metaphorically about people who exhibited these characteristics. An ancient poet, Bai Juyi (772–846), thought that to be a gentleman, a man does not need to be physically strong, but he must be mentally strong, upright, and perseverant. Just as a bamboo is hollow-hearted, he should open his heart to accept anything of benefit and never have arrogance or prejudice.

Bamboo is not only a symbol of a gentleman, but also plays an important role in Buddhism, which was introduced into China in the first century. As canons of Buddhism forbid cruelty to animals, flesh and egg were not allowed in the diet. The tender bamboo shoot (sǔn 筍 in Chinese) thus became a nutritious alternative. Preparation methods developed over thousands of years have come to be incorporated into Asian cuisines, especially for monks. A Buddhist monk, Zan Ning, wrote a manual of the bamboo shoot called Sǔn Pǔ (筍譜) offering descriptions and recipes for many kinds of bamboo shoots. Bamboo shoots have traditionally been a dish on the Chinese dinner table, especially in southern China. In ancient times, those who could afford a big house with a yard would plant bamboo in their garden.

==== Mythology ====
In a Chinese legend, the Emperor Yao gave two of his daughters to the future Emperor Shun as a test for his potential to rule. Shun passed the test of being able to run his household with the two emperor's daughters as wives, and thus Yao made Shun his successor, bypassing his unworthy son. After Shun's death, the tears of his two bereaved wives fell upon the bamboos growing there explains the origin of spotted bamboo. The two women later became goddesses Xiangshuishen after drowning themselves in the Xiang River.

=== Japan ===
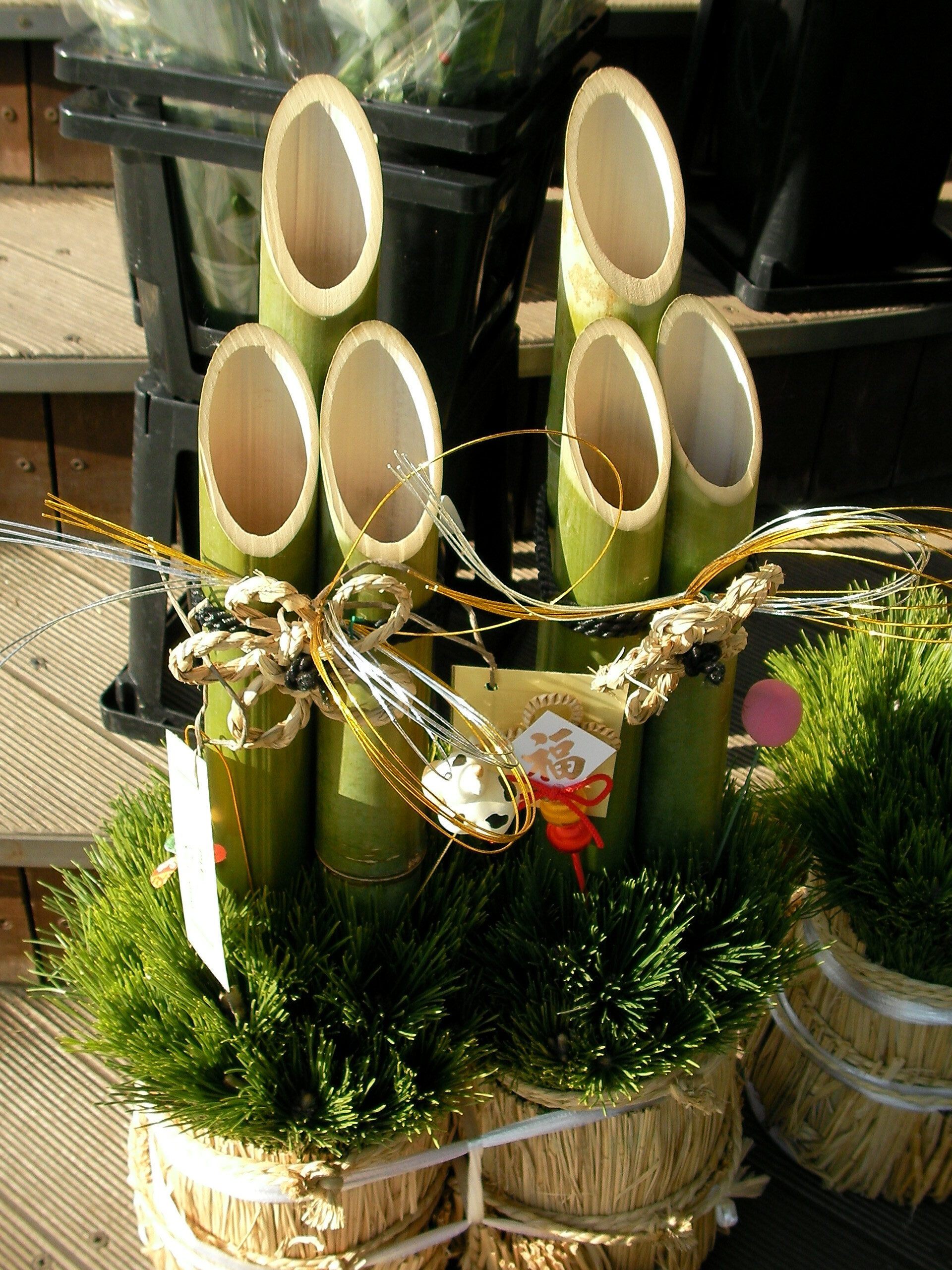
Bamboo kadomatsu made for Japanese New Year

Bamboo is a symbol of prosperity in Japan, and is used to make New Year's decorations called kadomatsu. Bamboo forests sometimes surround Shinto shrines and Buddhist temples as part of a sacred barrier against evil. In the folktale Tale of the Bamboo Cutter (Taketori Monogatari), princess Kaguya emerges from a shining bamboo section.

In Japan, the Chinese "Three Friends of Winter" (kansai sanyū) concept is traditionally used as a ranking system, where pine (松 matsu) is the first rank, bamboo (竹 take) is the second rank, and plum (梅 ume) is the third rank. This system is used in many traditional arts like with sushi sets, embroidering kimono or tiers of accommodations at traditional ryōkan taverns.

Bamboo is known to be a strong material and able to withstand extreme heat. It is the only plant known to have survived the atomic bombings of Hiroshima in 1945.

=== Malaysia ===
In Malaysia, a similar story includes a man who dreams of a beautiful woman while sleeping under a bamboo plant; he wakes up and breaks the bamboo stem, discovering the woman inside.

=== Philippines ===
In Philippine mythology, one of the more famous creation accounts tells of the first man Malakás ("Strong") and the first woman Maganda ("Beautiful") each emerging from one half of a split bamboo stem on an island formed after the battle between Sky and Ocean.

=== Vietnam ===
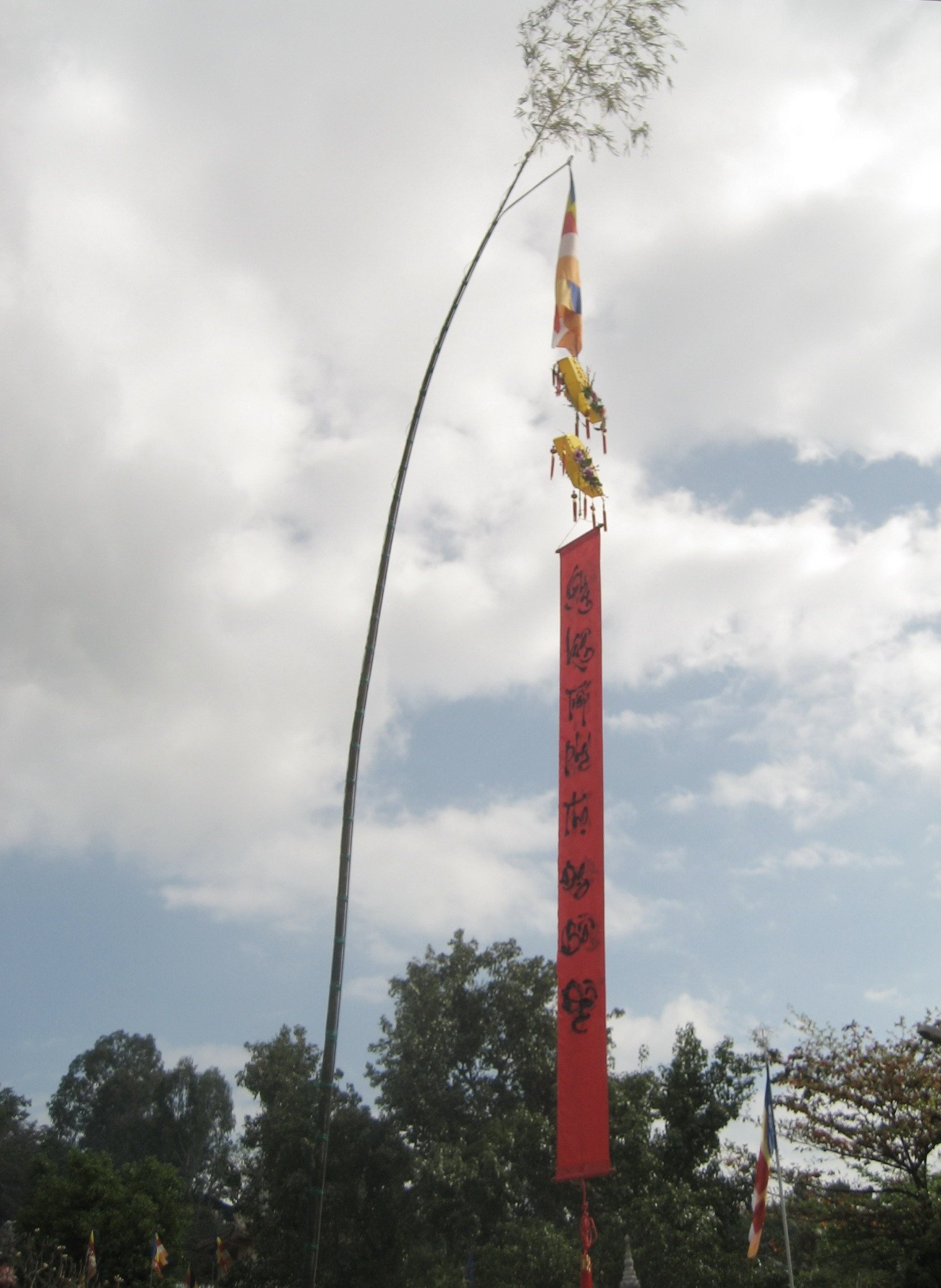
Cây nêu – A Vietnamese New Year tree made from bamboo

==== Attributions of character ====
Bamboo plays an important part of the culture of Vietnam. Bamboo symbolizes the spirit of Vovinam (a Vietnamese martial arts): cương nhu phối triển (coordination between hard and soft (martial arts)). Bamboo also symbolizes the Vietnamese hometown and Vietnamese soul: the gentlemanlike, straightforwardness, hard working, optimism, unity, and adaptability. A Vietnamese proverb says, "Tre già, măng mọc" (When the bamboo is old, the bamboo sprouts appear), the meaning being Vietnam will never be annihilated; if the previous generation dies, the children take their place. Therefore, the Vietnamese nation and Vietnamese values will be maintained and developed eternally. Traditional Vietnamese villages are surrounded by thick bamboo hedges (lũy tre).

During Ngô Đình Diệm's presidency, bamboo was the national symbol of South Vietnam, it was featured on the national coat of arms, presidential standard, and South Vietnamese đồng coins at the time.

==== Mythology ====
A bamboo cane is also the weapon of Vietnamese legendary hero, Thánh Gióng, who had grown up immediately and magically since the age of three because of his wish to liberate his land from Ân invaders. The ancient Vietnamese legend Cây tre trăm đốt (The Hundred-knot Bamboo Tree) tells of a poor, young farmer who fell in love with his landlord's beautiful daughter. The farmer asked the landlord for his daughter's hand in marriage, but the proud landlord would not allow her to be bound in marriage to a poor farmer. The landlord decided to foil the marriage with an impossible deal; the farmer must bring him a "bamboo tree of 100 nodes". But Gautama Buddha (Bụt) appeared to the farmer and told him that such a tree could be made from 100 nodes from several different trees. Bụt gave to him four magic words to attach the many nodes of bamboo: Khắc nhập, khắc xuất, which means "joined together immediately, fell apart immediately". The triumphant farmer returned to the landlord and demanded his daughter. Curious to see such a long bamboo, the landlord was magically joined to the bamboo when he touched it, as the young farmer said the first two magic words. The story ends with the happy marriage of the farmer and the landlord's daughter after the landlord agreed to the marriage and asked to be separated from the bamboo.

=== Africa ===
==== Tanzania ====
Tanzania possesses a large diversity of bamboo species.

==== Bozo ====
The Bozo ethnic group of West Africa take their name from the Bambara phrase bo-so, which means "bamboo house".

=== Saint Lucia ===
Bamboo is also the national plant of St. Lucia.

=== Hawaiian ===
Hawaiian bamboo ('ohe) is a kinolau or body form of the Polynesian creator god Kāne.

=== North America ===
Arundinaria bamboos, known as giant cane or river cane, are a central part of the material cultures of Southeastern Native American nations, so much so that they have been called "the plastic of the Southeastern Indians". Among the Cherokee, river cane has been used to make waterproof baskets, mats, fishing poles, flutes, blowguns, arrows, and to build houses, among other uses; the seed and young shoots are also edible. Traditional Cherokee double-woven baskets, crafted from river cane that has been split and dyed in various colors, are sometimes considered among the finest in the world. Since the North American bamboos are now rare, with 98% of their original extent eliminated, the Cherokee have initiated an effort to restore it.

== See also ==
- List of bamboo species
- Bambuseae
- Bamboo blossom
- International Network for Bamboo and Rattan
- Bamboo construction
- Bamboo textile
- Bamboo processing machine
- Ceremonial pole
- Mautam
