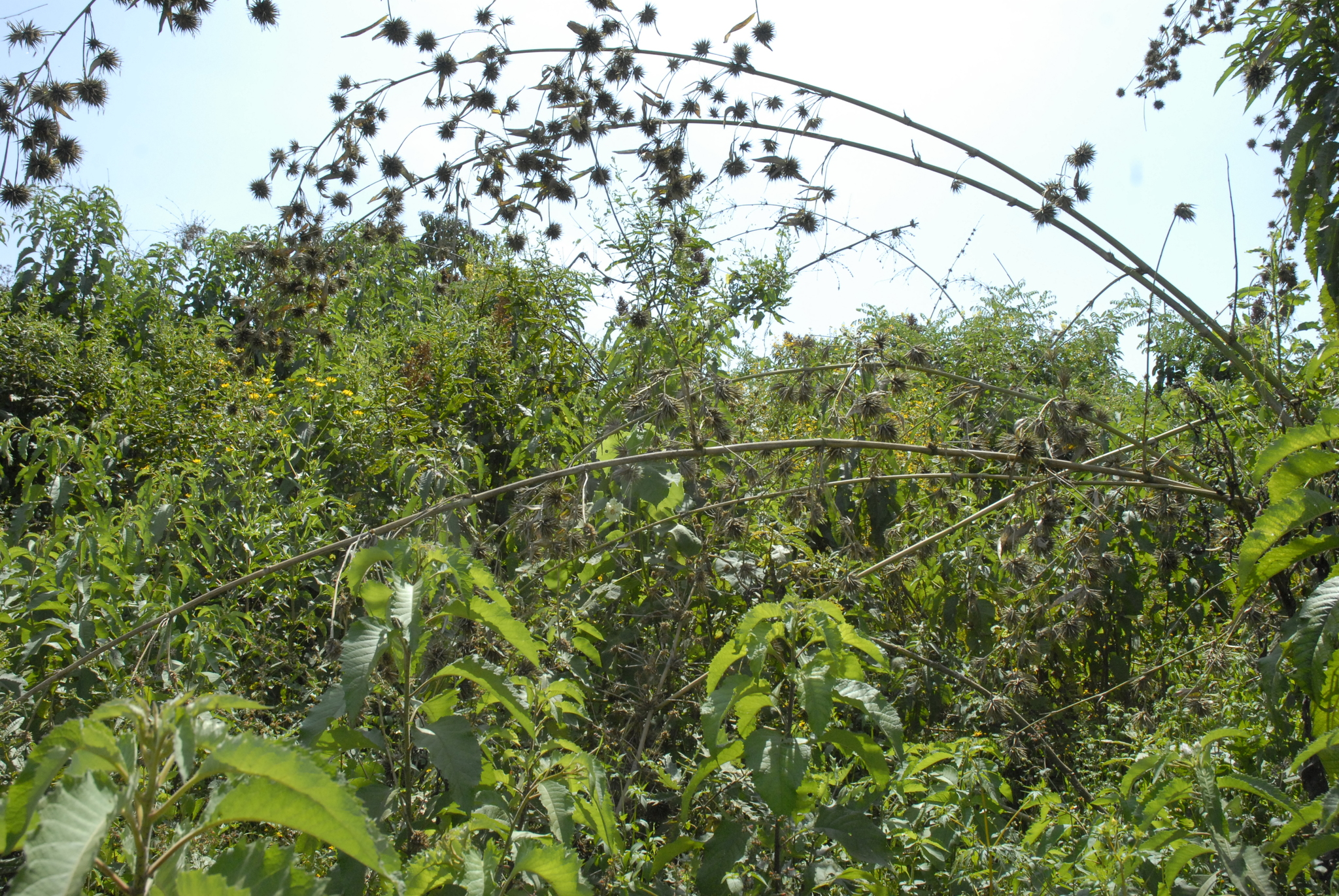

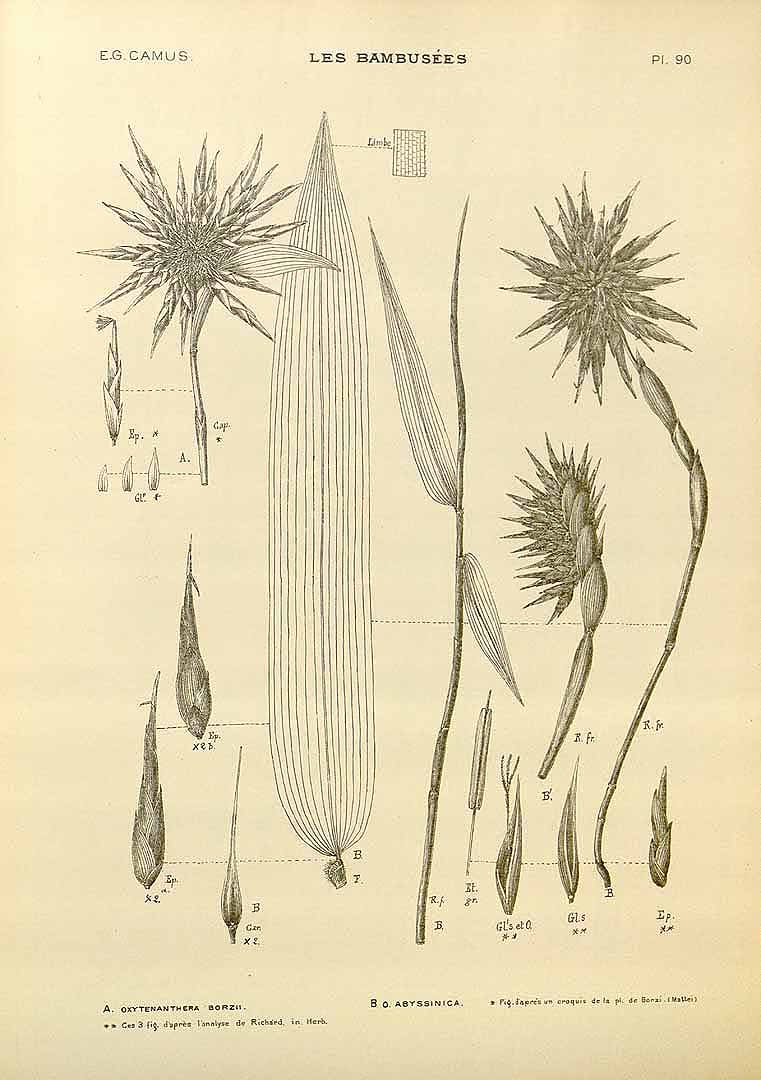
- Oxytenanthera abyssinica

Scientific classification
- Kingdom: Plantae
- Clade: Tracheophytes
- Clade: Angiosperms
- Clade: Monocots
- Clade: Commelinids
- Order: Poales
- Family: Poaceae
- Subfamily: Bambusoideae
- Tribe: Bambuseae
- Subtribe: Bambusinae
- Genus: Oxytenanthera; Munro
- Species: O. abyssinica

Binomial name
- Oxytenanthera abyssinica (A.Rich.) Munro

Synonyms
- Houzeaubambus Mattei; Bambusa abyssinica A.Rich.; Bambusa schimperiana Steud.; Oxytenanthera macrothyrsus K.Schum.; Oxytenanthera braunii Pilg.; Oxytenanthera borzii Mattei; Houzeaubambus borzii (Mattei) Mattei

= Oxytenanthera =

Genus of grasses

Oxytenanthera is a genus of African bamboo. Bamboos are members of the grass family Poaceae.

The only recognised species in this genus is Oxytenanthera abyssinica. This species is found widespread across much of sub-Saharan Africa. In tropical Africa it is found outside of the humid forest zone from Senegal to Ethiopia. In Eastern Africa it is found to occur from Ethiopia all the way down to northern South Africa.

Oxytenanthera is the most common lowland bamboo in eastern and central Africa, resulting in its common name of African lowland bamboo. It is also referred to as savannah bamboo or Bindura bamboo.

== Distribution ==
Oxytenanthera is widespread in the tropical parts of Africa. It occurs from The Gambia to Ethiopia, from Gabon to Kenya, and from Angola to Mozambique, and in the Limpopo Province in the northern parts of South Africa.

== Habitat ==
Oxytenanthera prefers Miombo woodland habitat.

== Taxonomy ==
The genus formerly contained several Asiatic species, but these are now generally considered to be better suited to other genera (primarily Dendrocalamus or Gigantochloa but see also Bambusa Cephalostachyum Pseudoxytenanthera Schizostachyum Yushania); However, molecular studies show species of Oxytenanthera quite distinct from Dendrocalamus spp.

== Ecology ==
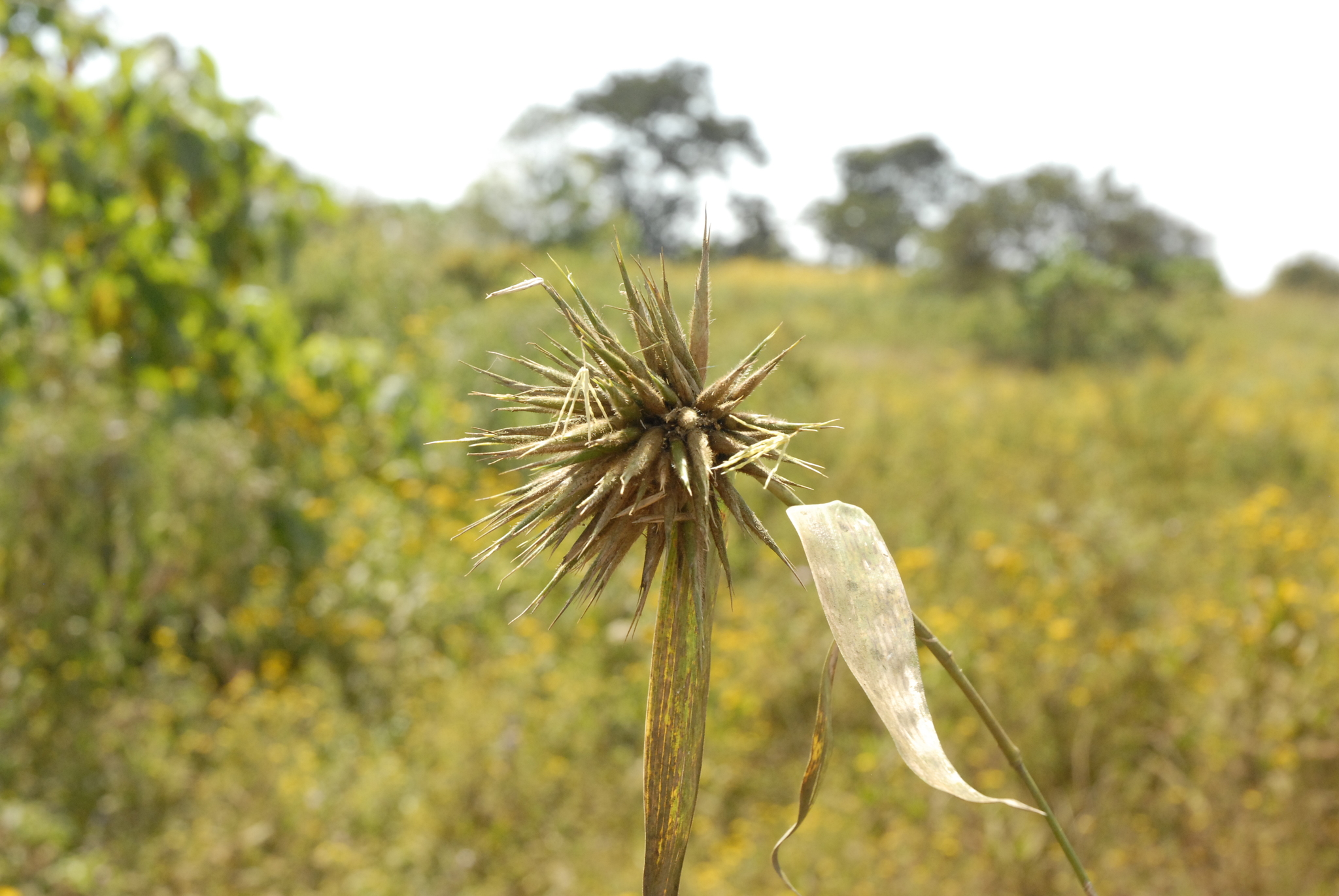

Oxytenanthera abyssinica is a drought-resistant species of bamboo that grows in savanna woodland, semi-arid wooded grassland and thicket. It mass-flowers (gregarious flowering) after long periods of vegetative growth of more than 70 years before occasionally sets seed. The seed of Oxytenanthera abyssinica is considered rare. After setting seed the parent plant dies back, sometimes synchronously across large areas. The last known seeding period occurred in 2006 in West Africa and 2010 in Ethiopia.

== Uses ==
Traditional uses of Oxytenanthera abyssinica include weaving for basketry, as a building material for local construction, houses and furniture, and in the Southern Highlands of Tanzania in Iringa, Mbeya and Ruvuma Regions it is tapped for its juice, and fermented for the production of a local alcoholic beverage.

However more recently the species has come under commercial production by EcoPlanet Bamboo. Using seed from the most recent flowering event this entity has used Oxytenanthera abyssinica for the regeneration of degraded agricultural lands in South Africa's Eastern Cape.

Through EcoPlanet Bamboo's extensive R&D around this species and trials carried out to showcase its ability to restore degraded landscapes Oxytenanthera abyssinica has recently been touted by international institutions including the World Resources Institute as having a high potential for industrial production.

Kenyan entity Kitil Farm has developed a resource base of Oxytenanthera abyssinica seedlings in Isinya.

== Conservation status ==
In South Africa, it is classified as Data Deficient: taxonomically problematic, which means it is likely to be threatened since its native habitat and range is under threat but it's not well-defined.
