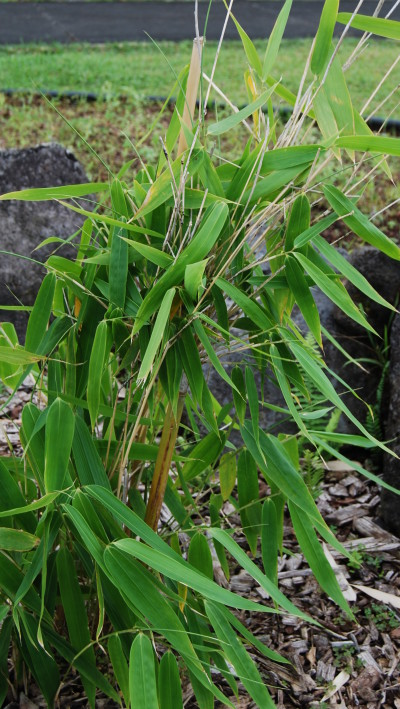
- ʻOhe (Schizostachyum glaucifolium)

Scientific classification
- Kingdom: Plantae
- Clade: Tracheophytes
- Clade: Angiosperms
- Clade: Monocots
- Clade: Commelinids
- Order: Poales
- Family: Poaceae
- Subfamily: Bambusoideae
- Tribe: Bambuseae
- Subtribe: Melocanninae
- Genus: Schizostachyum; Nees

Type species
- Schizostachyum blumei Nees

Synonyms
- Dendrochloa C.E.Parkinson; Teinostachyum Munro

= Schizostachyum =

Genus of grasses

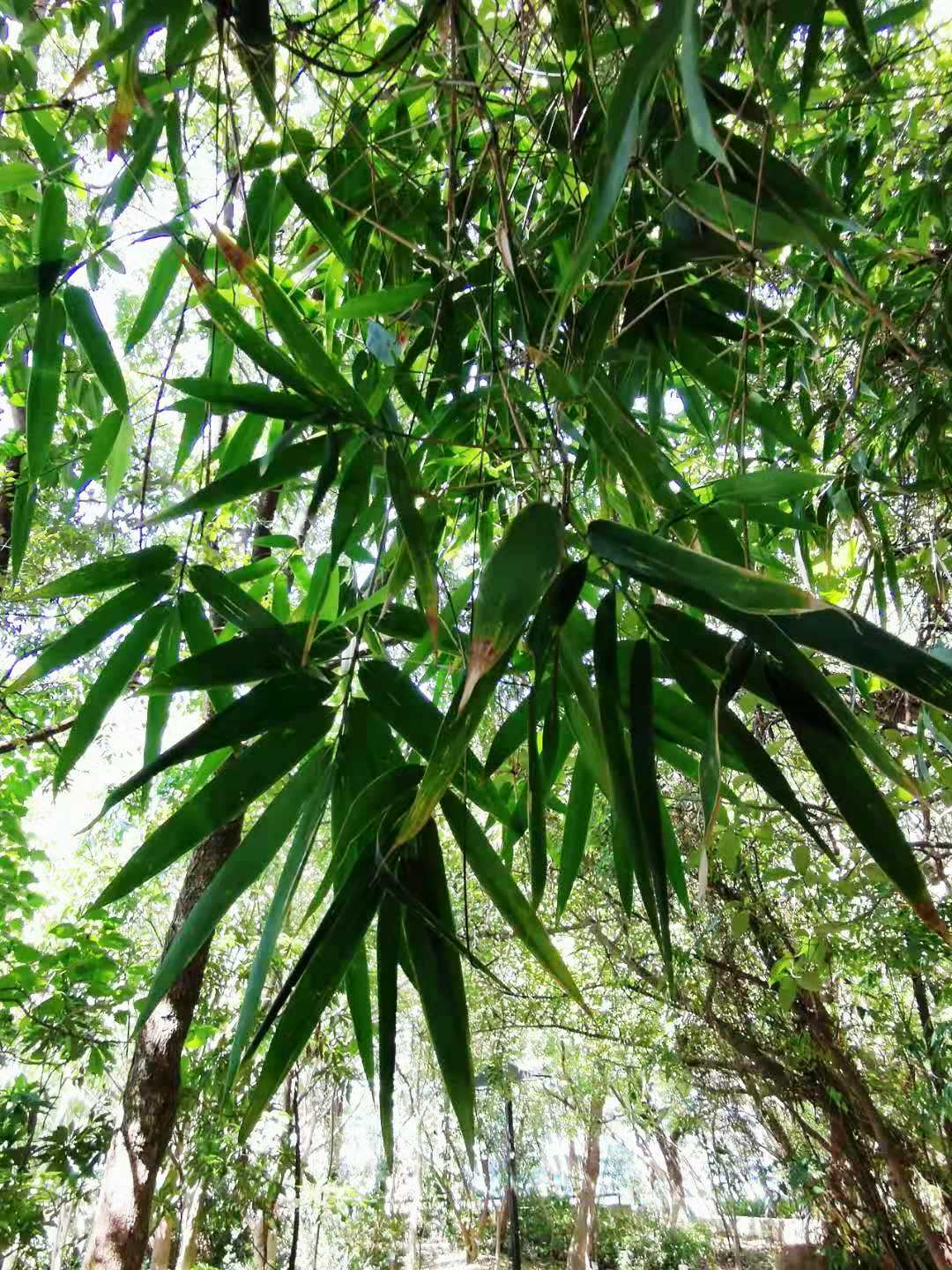
Schizostachyum diffusum is a climbing bamboo that grows in clusters.

Schizostachyum is a tall or shrub-like tropical genus of bamboo. They are natives mostly of tropical Asia and Papuasia, with a few species in Madagascar and on certain islands in the Pacific. A few have become naturalized in other tropical regions.

== Description ==
The genus name comes from Greek schistos ("cleft") and stachys ("spike"), referring to the spacing of spikelets.

These are clumping, sometimes climbing woody bamboos, with terete culm-internodes and short, thick (pachymorph), perennial rhizomes.

== Species ==
The following are included in Plants of the World Online:

- Schizostachyum aciculare - Borneo, Malaysia, Indochina
- Schizostachyum aequiramosum - Java
- Schizostachyum alopecurus - New Guinea
- Schizostachyum andamanicum - Andaman Islands
- Schizostachyum atrocingulare - Sumatra
- Schizostachyum auriculatum - Guangxi
- Schizostachyum bamban - Sumatra
- Schizostachyum beddomei - India
- Schizostachyum blumei Nees - from Vietnam to Java - type species
- Schizostachyum brachycladum - from Vietnam to Java
- Schizostachyum brachythyrsus - New Guinea
- Schizostachyum castaneum - Bali
- Schizostachyum caudatum - Java, Sumatra
- Schizostachyum chinense - Yunnan
- Schizostachyum copelandii - New Guinea
- Schizostachyum coradatum - Jiangxi
- Schizostachyum cornutum - Sumatra
- Schizostachyum curranii - Philippines
- Schizostachyum cuspidatum - Sumatra
- Schizostachyum diaoluoshanense - Hainan
- Schizostachyum distans - Myanmar
- Schizostachyum dullooa - Eastern Himalayas, Myanmar, Vietnam
- Schizostachyum dumetorum - Guangdong, Jiangxi
- Schizostachyum flexuosum - Borneo
- Schizostachyum funghomii - Arunachal Pradesh, Yunnan, Guangdong, Guangxi, Vietnam; naturalized in Honduras, Puerto Rico
- Schizostachyum glaucifolium - Marquesas
- Schizostachyum glaucocladum - Kalimantan
- Schizostachyum gracile - Vietnam, Peninsular Malaysia
- Schizostachyum grande - Laos, Peninsular Malaysia
- Schizostachyum griffithii - Assam, Myanmar
- Schizostachyum hainanense - Hainan, Vietnam
- Schizostachyum hantu - Sarawak
- Schizostachyum helferi (Munro) R.B.Majumdar - Bangladesh, northeast India, Myanmar
- Schizostachyum insulare - Peninsular Malaysia
- Schizostachyum iraten - Java
- Schizostachyum jaculans - Hainan, Thailand, Peninsular Malaysia
- Schizostachyum kalpongianum - Andaman Islands
- Schizostachyum khoonmengii - Brunei
- Schizostachyum kuisingii K.M.Wong - Peninsular Malaysia
- Schizostachyum langbianense V.T.Tran, N.H.Xia & H.N.Nguyen - Vietnam
- Schizostachyum latifolium - Sumatra, Peninsular Malaysia
- Schizostachyum lengguanii - Peninsular Malaysia
- Schizostachyum lima - Philippines, Sulawesi, Maluku, New Guinea, Bismarck Archipelago, Solomon Islands
- Schizostachyum lumampao - Philippines
- Schizostachyum lutescens - Sumatra
- Schizostachyum mampouw - Sumatra
- Schizostachyum mannii - Assam
- Schizostachyum nghianum N.H.Xia & V.T.Tran
- Schizostachyum ninhthuanense N.H.Xia, V.T.Tran & H.N.Nguyen - Vietnam
- Schizostachyum pergracile (Munro) R.B.Majumdar
- Schizostachyum perrieri - Madagascar
- Schizostachyum pilosum - Sabah
- Schizostachyum pingbianense - Yunnan
- Schizostachyum pleianthemum - Sumatra
- Schizostachyum pseudolima - Hainan, Vietnam
- Schizostachyum rogersii - Myanmar, Andaman Islands
- Schizostachyum sanguineum - Yunnan
- Schizostachyum seshagirianum - Arunachal Pradesh
- Schizostachyum silicatum - Sumatra
- Schizostachyum terminale - Peninsular Malaysia
- Schizostachyum tessellatum - Solomon Islands
- Schizostachyum textorium - Philippines
- Schizostachyum undulatum - Sumatra
- Schizostachyum wanshishanense - Fujian
- Schizostachyum warburgii - Maluku
- Schizostachyum whitei - New Guinea
- Schizostachyum yalyense - Vietnam
- Schizostachyum zollingeri - from Vietnam to Java

formerly included

see Bambusa Cephalostachyum Cyrtochloa Dendrocalamus Dinochloa Eremocaulon Gigantochloa Nastus Neohouzeaua Pseudostachyum Pseudoxytenanthera Sirochloa

- Schizostachyum acutiflorum - Dinochloa acutiflora
- Schizostachyum annulatum - Bambusa distegia
- Schizostachyum apus - Gigantochloa apus
- Schizostachyum arunachalensis - Stapletonia arunachalensis
- Schizostachyum bitung - Dendrocalamus asper
- Schizostachyum bosseri - Sirochloa parvifolia
- Schizostachyum brassii - Bambusa riparia
- Schizostachyum burmanicum - Cephalostachyum burmanicum
- Schizostachyum capitatum - Eremocaulon capitatum
- Schizostachyum chilianthum - Nastus elegantissimus
- Schizostachyum dielsianum - Dinochloa dielsiana
- Schizostachyum diffusum - Dinochloa diffusa
- Schizostachyum dumosum - Dendrocalamus dumosus
- Schizostachyum durie - Bambusa spinosa
- Schizostachyum elegans - Dendrocalamus elegans
- Schizostachyum elegantissimum - Nastus elegantissimus
- Schizostachyum fenixii - Cyrtochloa fenixii
- Schizostachyum flavescens - Cephalostachyum flavescens
- Schizostachyum fuchsianum - Cephalostachyum latifolium
- Schizostachyum hasskarlianum - Gigantochloa hasskarliana
- Schizostachyum hindostanicum - Pseudoxytenanthera ritcheyi
- Schizostachyum kurzii - Pseudobambusa schizostachyoides
- Schizostachyum leviculme - Pseudostachyum polymorphum
- Schizostachyum loriforme - Dendrocalamus asper
- Schizostachyum luzonicum - Cyrtochloa luzonica
- Schizostachyum munroi - Cephalostachyum capitatum
- Schizostachyum palawanense - Dinochloa palawanensis
- Schizostachyum pallidum - Cephalostachyum pallidum
- Schizostachyum parvifolium - Sirochloa parvifolia
- Schizostachyum pergracile - Cephalostachyum pergracile
- Schizostachyum polymorphum - Pseudostachyum polymorphum
- Schizostachyum scandens - Cephalostachyum scandens
- Schizostachyum serpentinum - Gigantochloa nigrociliata
- Schizostachyum sharmae - Cephalostachyum latifolium
- Schizostachyum strictum - Neohouzeaua stricta
- Schizostachyum subcordatum - Dendrocalamus pendulus
- Schizostachyum tavoyanum - Neohouzeaua tavoyana
- Schizostachyum toppingii - Cyrtochloa toppingii
- Schizostachyum virgatum - Cephalostachyum virgatum

Some also include the genus Leptocanna in this genus.
