= Melocanna =

Scientific classification
- Kingdom: Plantae
- Clade: Tracheophytes
- Clade: Angiosperms
- Clade: Monocots
- Clade: Commelinids
- Order: Poales
- Family: Poaceae
- Subfamily: Bambusoideae
- Tribe: Bambuseae
- Subtribe: Melocanninae
- Genus: Melocanna; Trin.

Type species
- Melocanna bambusoides (syn of M. baccifera) Trin.

Synonyms
- Beesha Kunth

Genus of grasses

Melocanna is a genus of Asian clumping bamboo in the grass family.

The 48-year cycle of M. baccifera in northeastern India is responsible for the phenomenon called "mautam" or "bamboo death", in which large populations of bamboo flower at the same time, this being followed by a plague of rats, which in turn triggers a famine within the human populations.

Species

1. Melocanna arundina C.E.Parkinson – Thailand, Myanmar; naturalized in parts of southern China
2. Melocanna baccifera (Roxb.) Kurz - Nagaland, Nepal, Sikkim, Bhutan, Assam, Mizoram, Manipur, Bangladesh, Myanmar; sparingly naturalized in parts of West Indies and South America

Formerly included

see Bambusa, Cephalostachyum, Gigantochloa, Nastus, Ochlandra, and Schizostachyum

- M. clarkei – Cephalostachyum mannii
- M. elegantissima – Nastus elegantissimus
- M. excelsa – Gigantochloa verticillata
- M. gracilis – Schizostachyum gracile
- M. kurzii – Bambusa schizostachyoides
- M. rheedei – Ochlandra scriptoria
- M. virgata – Cephalostachyum virgatum
- M. zollingeri – Schizostachyum zollingeri
