= Pseudostachyum =

Scientific classification
- Kingdom: Plantae
- Clade: Tracheophytes
- Clade: Angiosperms
- Clade: Monocots
- Clade: Commelinids
- Order: Poales
- Family: Poaceae
- Subfamily: Bambusoideae
- Tribe: Bambuseae
- Subtribe: Melocanninae
- Genus: Pseudostachyum; Munro
- Species: P. polymorphum

Binomial name
- Pseudostachyum polymorphum Munro

Synonyms
- Schizostachyum polymorphum (Munro) R.B.Majumdar; Pseudostachyum wakha Brandis ex E.G.Camus; Schizostachyum leviculme McClure

Genus of grasses

Pseudostachyum polymorphum is a monotypic Asian species of bamboo in the grass family.

It is the only known species of the genus Pseudostachyum. The plant is found in Assam, Arunachal Pradesh, Bhutan, Myanmar, Vietnam, Thailand, and southern China (Yunnan, Guangdong, Guangxi).

Formerly included

see Melocalamus Neohouzeaua

- Pseudostachyum compactiflorum - Melocalamus compactiflorus
- Pseudostachyum glomeriflorum - Melocalamus compactiflorus
- Pseudostachyum helferi - Neohouzeaua helferi
