= Ohe =

Ohe or OHE may refer to:

- Ohe (Allna), a river of Hesse, Germany
- Ohe (Sagter Ems), a river of Lower Saxony, Germany
- Osthannoversche Eisenbahnen, a German transportation company
- Mohe Gulian Airport (IATA code OHE), China
- Overhead equipment, in railway electrification
- 'ohe, a species of bamboo
