= Schizostachyum aciculare =

Scientific classification
- Kingdom: Plantae
- Clade: Tracheophytes
- Clade: Angiosperms
- Clade: Monocots
- Clade: Commelinids
- Order: Poales
- Family: Poaceae
- Tribe: Bambuseae
- Subtribe: Melocanninae
- Genus: Schizostachyum
- Species: S. aciculare

Binomial name
- Schizostachyum aciculare Gamble (1896)

Species of flowering plant

Schizostachyum aciculare is a species of bamboo in the tribe Bambuseae of the family Poaceae. The recorded range of this species is Indo-China to Peninsular Malaysia and Borneo. In Vietnam it may be called mung or nứa.
