= Elnhauser Wasser =

River in Germany

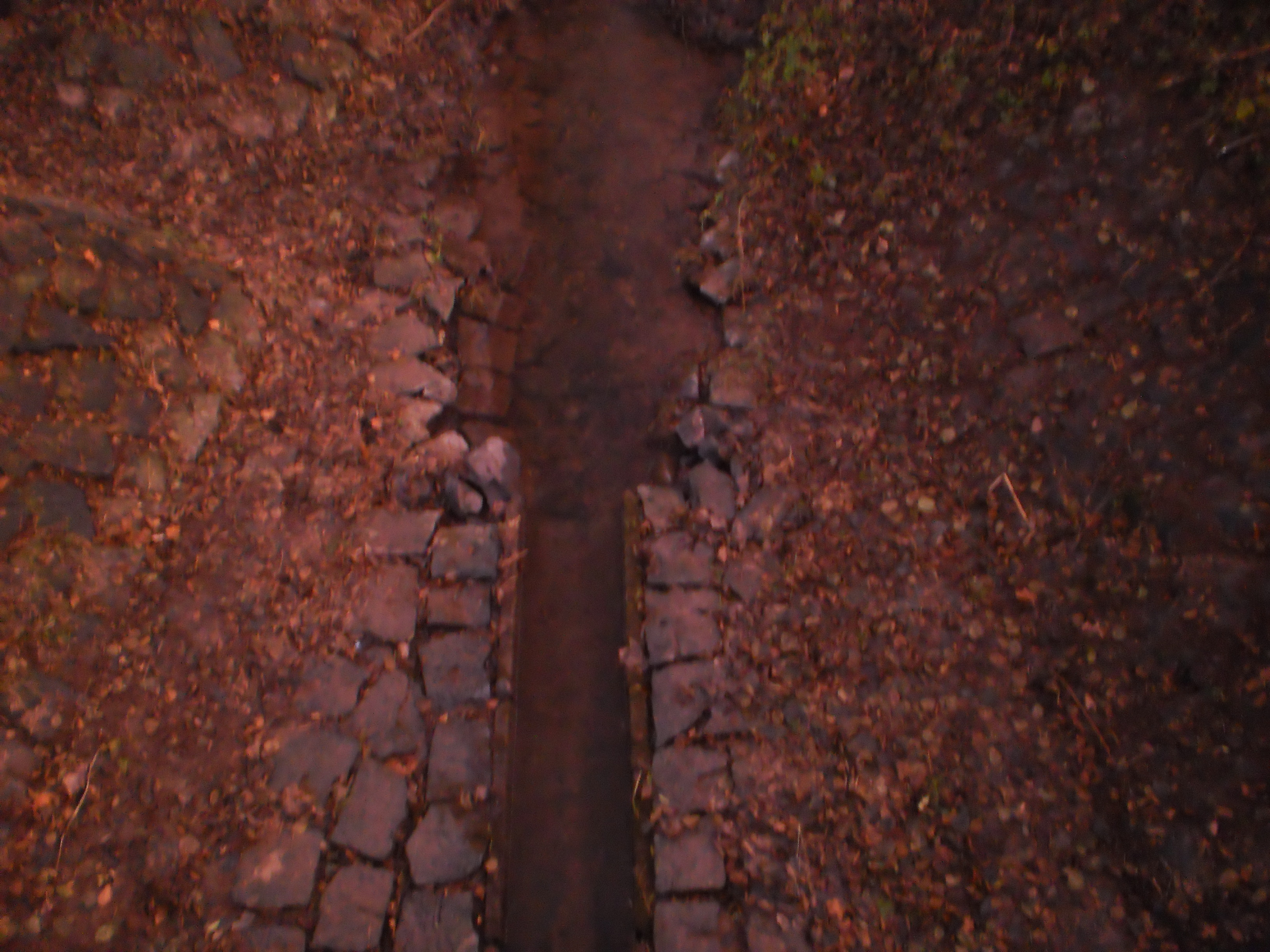

Location
- Country: Germany
- State: Hesse

Physical characteristics
- Mouth
  - location: Ohe
  - coordinates: 50.7894°N 8.6943°E

Basin features
- Progression: Ohe→ Allna→ Lahn→ Rhine→ North Sea

Elnhauser Wasser is a small river in Hesse, Germany. It flows into the Ohe near Hermershausen.

== See also ==
- List of rivers of Hesse
