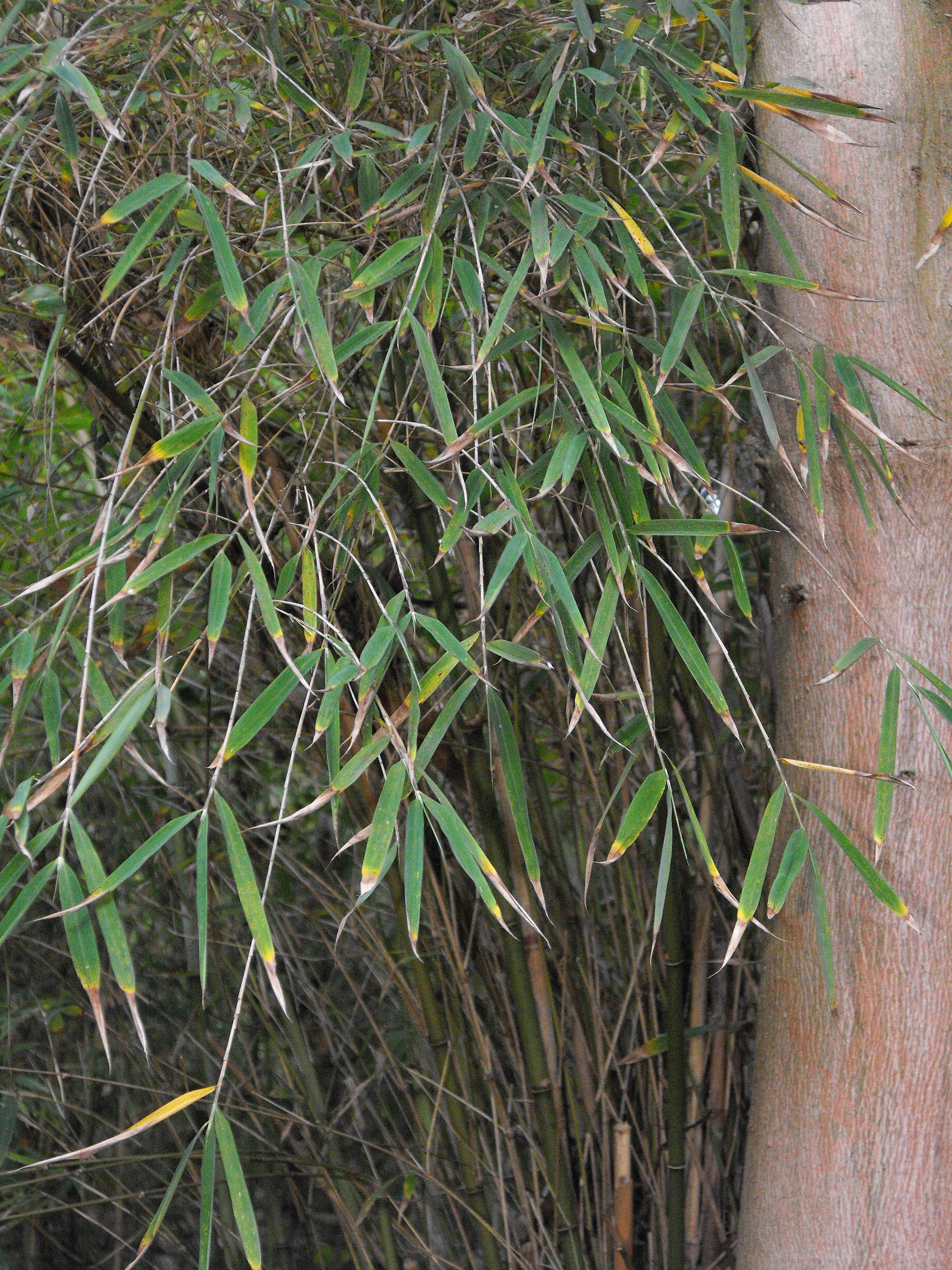
- Cephalostachyum pergracile

Scientific classification
- Kingdom: Plantae
- Clade: Tracheophytes
- Clade: Angiosperms
- Clade: Monocots
- Clade: Commelinids
- Order: Poales
- Family: Poaceae
- Subfamily: Bambusoideae
- Tribe: Bambuseae
- Subtribe: Melocanninae
- Genus: Cephalostachyum; Munro

Type species
- Cephalostachyum capitatum Munro

Synonyms
- Leptocanna L.C.Chia & H.L.Fung

= Cephalostachyum =

Genus of grasses

Cephalostachyum is a genus of Asian and Madagascan bamboo in the grass family.

The plants are of small to medium size compared to most other bamboo. Their choice habitats are mountain to lowland forests.

Species

1. Cephalostachyum burmanicum - Myanmar
2. Cephalostachyum capitatum - Myanmar, Assam, Bhutan
3. Cephalostachyum chapelieri - Madagascar
4. Cephalostachyum flavescens - Myanmar, Andaman Islands
5. Cephalostachyum langbianense - Vietnam
6. Cephalostachyum latifolium - Yunnan, Myanmar, Assam, Bhutan, Nepal, Sikkim
7. Cephalostachyum mannii - Yunnan, Assam, Arunachal Pradesh, Bhutan
8. Cephalostachyum mindorense - Philippines
9. Cephalostachyum pallidum - Yunnan, Myanmar, Assam, Tibet
10. Cephalostachyum pergracile - Yunnan, Myanmar, Assam, Laos, Bhutan
11. Cephalostachyum perrieri - Madagascar
12. Cephalostachyum scandens - Yunnan, Myanmar
13. Cephalostachyum viguieri - Madagascar
14. Cephalostachyum virgatum - Yunnan, Myanmar, Laos, Vietnam

formerly included

see Bambusa Cathariostachys Dendrocalamus Kinabaluchloa Schizostachyum

- Cephalostachyum chevalieri - Kinabaluchloa wrayi
- Cephalostachyum chinense - Schizostachyum chinense
- Cephalostachyum griffithii - Schizostachyum griffithii
- Cephalostachyum madagascariense - Cathariostachys madagascariensis
- Cephalostachyum malayense - Dendrocalamus pendulus
- Cephalostachyum peclardii - Cathariostachys capitata
- Cephalostachyum pingbianense - Schizostachyum pingbianense
- Cephalostachyum sanguineum - Schizostachyum sanguineum
- Cephalostachyum schizostachyoides - Bambusa schizostachyoides

Museums

Chinese maps show a Cephalostachyum Museum in Beijing. However, this appears to be a mistranslation; the museum is actually dedicated to the diabolo, a kind of yo-yo made of bamboo.

== See also ==
- List of Poaceae genera
