= Davidsea =

Scientific classification
- Kingdom: Plantae
- Clade: Tracheophytes
- Clade: Angiosperms
- Clade: Monocots
- Clade: Commelinids
- Order: Poales
- Family: Poaceae
- Subfamily: Bambusoideae
- Tribe: Bambuseae
- Subtribe: Melocanninae
- Genus: Davidsea; Soderstr. & R.P.Ellis
- Species: D. attenuata

Binomial name
- Davidsea attenuata (Thwaites) Soderstr. & R.P.Ellis

Synonyms
- Bambusa attenuata Thwaites; Teinostachyum attenuatum (Thwaites) Munro

Genus of grasses

Davidsea attenuata is a Sri Lankan species of bamboo in the grass family.

Davidsea attenuata is only known species of the genus Davidsea. The people of its natural range in Sri Lanka use the leaves to weave baskets.
