= Star lantern =

Traditional Vietnamese craft

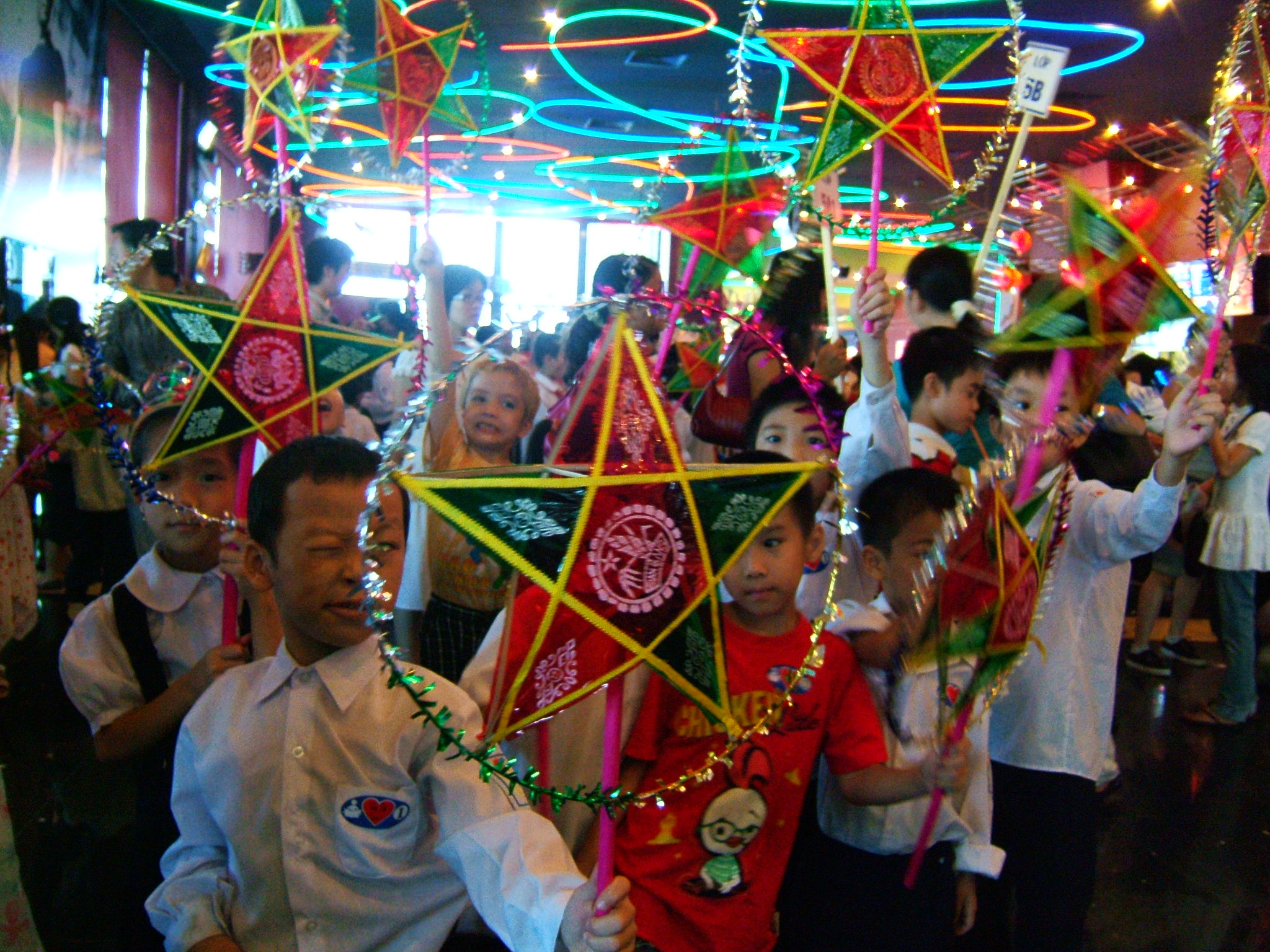
Đèn ông sao

A Star lantern (Vietnamese: Đèn ông sao) is a traditional Vietnamese toy often used in Mid-Autumn Festival. The toy is made from bamboo, Neohouzeaua coloured paper and jute. The toy is highly regarded in Vietnamese society as a unique and distinct part of Mid-Autumn Festival and are handmade in specialized traditional craft villages.

== History ==
It is unclear when the star lantern was invented, but the toy was passed from generations to generations in many villages throughout Vietnam.

=== Legend ===
The traditional account holds that the star lantern was created by a lovelorn king long ago. When the king was still young, he fell in love with a girl, but he soon found out she was dishonest with him. In his desperation to find out the truth, the Buddha appears to him and bestows a garment that conceals his identity. Learning that the girl had indeed taken another lover, the boy focused on working and learning, and soon became the king of the country. To put his memory to rest, the king created the star lantern, along with cloth like the garment the Buddha had given him years ago. Only children can wear these clothes, brightened by the star lanterns, and celebrate his memory in Mid-Autumn Festival.

== Crafting ==
The star lantern is completely handmade and are crafted from several traditional craft villages in Vietnam. The job was passed from generations to generations. In most households, creating Star Lantern is now considered a "side job", however, is often the job with the highest income. There are many sizes of Star Lantern with prices ranging from 4.000 VND (US$0.17) to 450.000 VND (around US$20).

=== Ingredients ===
The lanterns are made of bamboo sticks, Neohouzeaua which is a genus of Asian bamboo that is more grass-like, coloured paper and jute. Sometimes candles can be placed inside the Lantern to create light, but these are missing in most modern lanterns, instead are replaced with LED lights.

=== Crafting process ===
Bamboo and Neohouzeaua are often prepared half a year before creating a star lantern. The bamboos need to be soaked in water for a long time in order for it to be more elastic. The lantern maker would then arrange them into 2 star formations on top of each other, arcing towards the middle, use wires made of zinc to tie the bamboos together. Sometimes in home-made star lantern, duct tape or rubber band can be used instead of zinc wire. Coloured paper would then be placed and glued to the bamboo sticks. Sometimes a candle or LED light can be placed inside. Drawings and typography can also be put on the coloured paper.

More ribbons can be glued on and around the points of the star to create a circle around the lantern. A handle made of bamboo can be attached to one of the 5 points of the star formation. Some lantern don't have hard handle of instead can be attached to a wire that is then attached to some other surfaces.
