= Waltersbach =

Waltersbach may refer to the following rivers and streams:

- Kleinwaltersdorfer Bach in Saxony
- Waltersbach (Elnhauser Wasser), tributary of the Elnhauser Wasser in Mittelhessen
