= Annamocalamus =

Scientific classification
- Kingdom: Plantae
- Clade: Tracheophytes
- Clade: Angiosperms
- Clade: Monocots
- Clade: Commelinids
- Order: Poales
- Family: Poaceae
- Subfamily: Bambusoideae
- Tribe: Bambuseae
- Subtribe: Melocanninae
- Genus: Annamocalamus; H.N.Nguyen, N.H.Xia & V.T.Tran (2013)
- Species: A. kontumensis

Binomial name
- Annamocalamus kontumensis H.N.Nguyen, N.H.Xia & V.T.Tran (2013)

Genus of flowering plants

Annamocalamus is a genus of flowering plants belonging to the family Poaceae. It contains a single species, Annamocalamus kontumensis, a bamboo endemic to Vietnam.
