= Cephalostachyum viguieri =

Scientific classification
- Kingdom: Plantae
- Clade: Tracheophytes
- Clade: Angiosperms
- Clade: Monocots
- Clade: Commelinids
- Order: Poales
- Family: Poaceae
- Genus: Cephalostachyum
- Species: C. viguieri

Binomial name
- Cephalostachyum viguieri A.Camus

Species of grass

Cephalostachyum viguieri is a plant in the grass family in the subfamily Bambusoideae (bamboo). It is native to Madagascar, where it was collected by René Viguier (1880–1931) for whom it was named.
