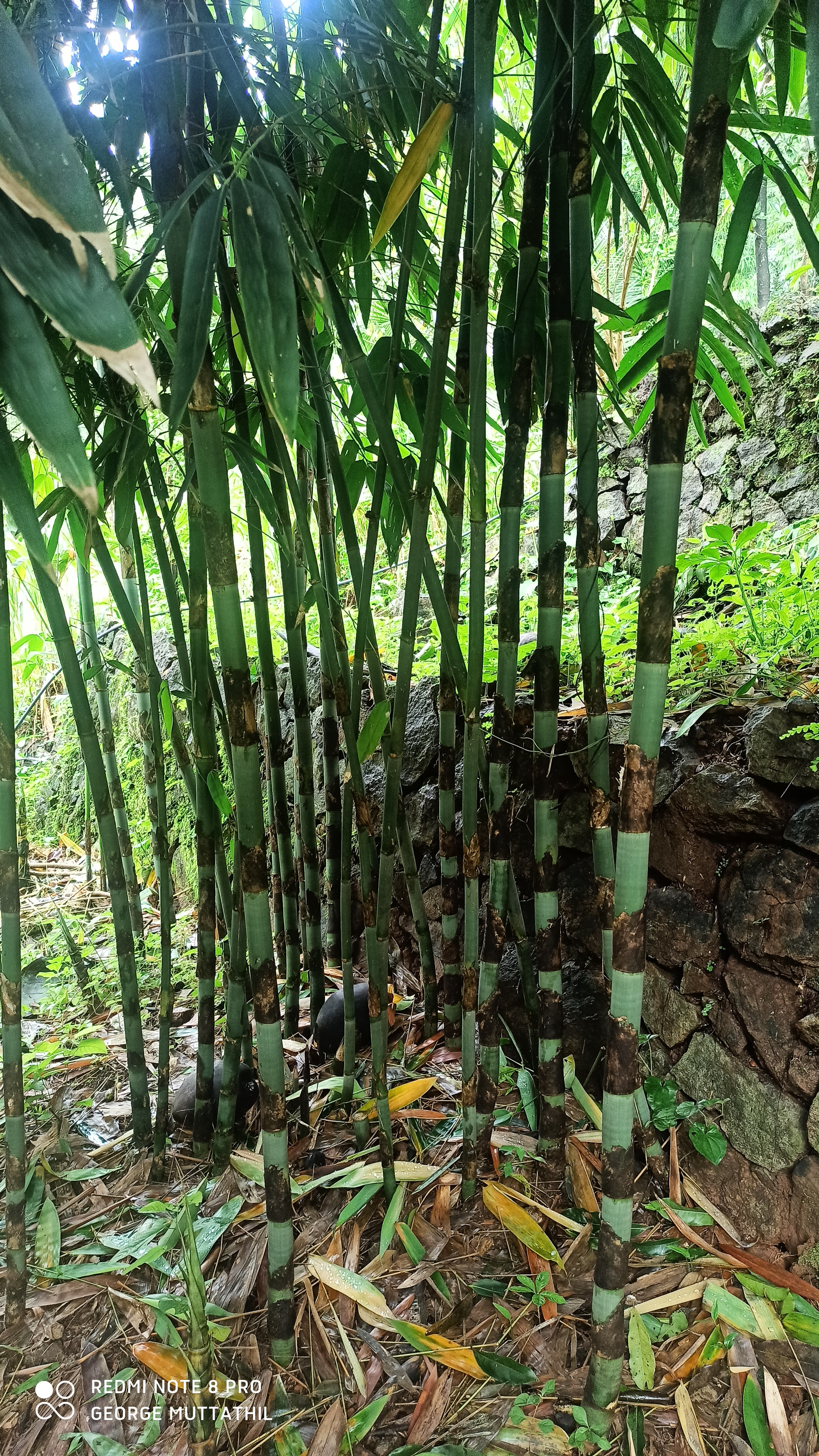

Scientific classification
- Kingdom: Plantae
- Clade: Tracheophytes
- Clade: Angiosperms
- Clade: Monocots
- Clade: Commelinids
- Order: Poales
- Family: Poaceae
- Genus: Melocanna
- Species: M. baccifera

Binomial name
- Melocanna baccifera (Roxb.) Kurz

Synonyms
- List: Bambusa baccifera Roxb.; Beesha baccifera (Roxb.) Kunth; Beesha rheediiKunth [Invalid]; Melocanna bambusoides Trin. [Illegitimate]; Nastus baccifera (Roxb.) Raspail

= Melocanna baccifera =

Species of grass

Melocanna baccifera is one of two bamboo species belonging to the genus Melocanna. It grows up to 10–25 m tall. It is native to Bangladesh, Myanmar, India, and Thailand.

== Habit ==
It is a tall, small-culmed bamboo with greenish young culms and straw-coloured old culms. It grows in clumps composed of many well-spaced culms. It has a dense appearance due to its branching habit.

== Description ==
The culms are greenish when young, but becomes straw-coloured when mature or brownish green when drying. Young culms are covered with stiff, silver hairs. A white bloom occurs just below the nodes. Young shoots are yellowish brown. The culms are straight; branching occurs from the base, and branches are many, short, loose, and open. The internode length is 25–50 cm, and diameter is 1.5–15 cm. The culm walls are thin, and the nodes are prominent.

The culm sheaths are greenish in young plants, turning brown when mature. The sheath proper is 7–15 cm long and 2.5–15 cm wide. The blade length is 10–30 cm. The auricles are equal. The upper surface of the sheath is covered with white hairs. The lower surface of the sheath is not hairy. The sheaths do not fall off, only the blades fall off.

== Flowering ==
Melocanna baccifera flowers almost fully synchronically every 48 years. verified bloomings having occurred in 1863, 1911, 1959, and 2007 with a precision exceeded only by Strobilanthes kunthiana This flowering results in the phenomenon known as Mautam; the population of black rats Rattus rattus burgeons owing to the plentiful food supply provided by the bamboo fruit (up to 80 tonnes per hectare), and once this is exhausted, famine follows as the rats move on to consume local crops, notably in the Northeast Indian state of Mizoram. The Jawaharlal Nehru Tropical Botanic Garden and Research Institute (JNTBGRI) Thiruvananthapuram conducted a study for 13 years between 2009 and 2022 on the flowering of Melocanna baccifera and its relation to the occurrence of 'rat floods'. Another peculiarity of M. baccifera is that, like Rhizophora species, its seeds can germinate while still attached to the mother plant, so that they drop to the ground as plantlets. Researchers have reported the highest ever fruit production of 456.67 kg in the bamboo clump.

== Research publication ==
A paper on the findings has appeared in the journal PLOS One on 16 November 2022. It was presumed earlier that the high protein in the fruit and seeds was attracting the rats. However the study conducted by JNTBGRI in 2016 found that the fruit actually contained very little protein and that the predation is mainly due to the high content of sugar. The research findings are of K.C. Koshy, B. Gopakumar, Anthony Sebastian, Ajikumaran Nair S, Anil John Johnson, Balaji Govindan and B Sabulal. The flowering pattern and fruit production discovered through this study will be helpful to the foresters and people involved in the conservation of this bamboo.
