= Stapletonia =

Scientific classification
- Kingdom: Plantae
- Clade: Tracheophytes
- Clade: Angiosperms
- Clade: Monocots
- Clade: Commelinids
- Order: Poales
- Family: Poaceae
- Subfamily: Bambusoideae
- Tribe: Bambuseae
- Subtribe: Melocanninae
- Genus: Stapletonia; P.Singh, S.S.Dash & P.Kumari

Genus of bamboo

Stapletonia is a genus of bamboo. It includes three species native to the eastern Himalaya.

- Stapletonia arunachalensis (H.B.Naithani) P.Singh, S.S.Dash & P.Kumari
- Stapletonia rigoensis L.B.Singha, P.Niri & R.Devi
- Stapletonia seshagiriania (R.B.Majumdar) H.B.Naithani
