= Schizostachyum lima =

Scientific classification
- Kingdom: Plantae
- Clade: Embryophytes
- Clade: Tracheophytes
- Clade: Angiosperms
- Clade: Monocots
- Clade: Commelinids
- Order: Poales
- Family: Poaceae
- Genus: Schizostachyum
- Species: S. lima

Binomial name
- Schizostachyum lima (Blanco) Merr.

Synonyms
- Arundarbor lima (Blanco) Kuntze; Bambusa lima Blanco; Schizostachyum hallieri Gamble; Schizostachyum stenocladum A.Camus

Species of flowering plant

Schizostachyum lima is a species of flowering plant in the family Poaceae. It is a bamboo that in Tagalog is commonly called anos / bokawe / bocaue, and in Cebuano: bagakay. It is propagated using seeds or rhizome cuttings. In the Philippines, it is often used for making sawali, fishing rods, and musical instruments. In some rural areas of the country, midwives still use sharp knives made of Schizostachyum lima to cut the newborn's umbilical cord.

The name of the Barangay (village) of Anos in Los Baños, Laguna, is derived from this species.
