= Stapletonia arunachalensis =

Scientific classification
- Kingdom: Plantae
- Clade: Tracheophytes
- Clade: Angiosperms
- Clade: Monocots
- Clade: Commelinids
- Order: Poales
- Family: Poaceae
- Genus: Stapletonia
- Species: S. arunachalensis

Binomial name
- Stapletonia arunachalensis (H.B.Naithani) P.Singh, S.S.Dash & P.Kumari

Synonyms
- Schizostachyum arunachalense H.B.Naithani

Species of bamboo

Stapletonia arunachalensis (syn. Schizostachyum arunachalense) is a bamboo in the tribe Bambuseae and subtribe Melocanninae in the family Poaceae. It is endemic to Arunachal Pradesh State in India. The culms grow to 3–15 m (10–50 ft) tall and 6–7 cm (2.4–2.8 in) diameter, and have very long internodes, up to 1.5 m (5 ft) in length, possibly the longest of any bamboo. It is one of very few bamboos with fleshy fruit, 5 cm diameter and superficially resembling an apple.

The species was first described as Schizostachyum arunachalense by Harsh Bardhan Naithani in 1992. In 2008 Paramjit Singh et al. placed the species in genus Stapletonia as Stapletonia arunachalensis.
