= Pseudoxytenanthera monadelpha =

Scientific classification
- Kingdom: Plantae
- Clade: Embryophytes
- Clade: Tracheophytes
- Clade: Spermatophytes
- Clade: Angiosperms
- Clade: Monocots
- Clade: Commelinids
- Order: Poales
- Family: Poaceae
- Genus: Pseudoxytenanthera
- Species: P. monadelpha

Binomial name
- Pseudoxytenanthera monadelpha (Thw.) Soderstr. & R.P.Ellis

Synonyms
- Bambusa monadelpha (Thwaites) O.F. Müll.; Dendrocalamus monadelphus Thwaites; Oxytenanthera monadelpha (Thwaites) Alston; Oxytenanthera thwaitesii Munro [Illegitimate]; Pseudotenanthera monadelpha (Thwaites) R.B.Majumdar

Species of grass

Pseudoxytenanthera monadelpha is a species of bamboo in the grass family. It is native to India, Sri Lanka, Laos, Myanmar, Vietnam.
