= Bamboo blossom =

Phenomenon in bamboo

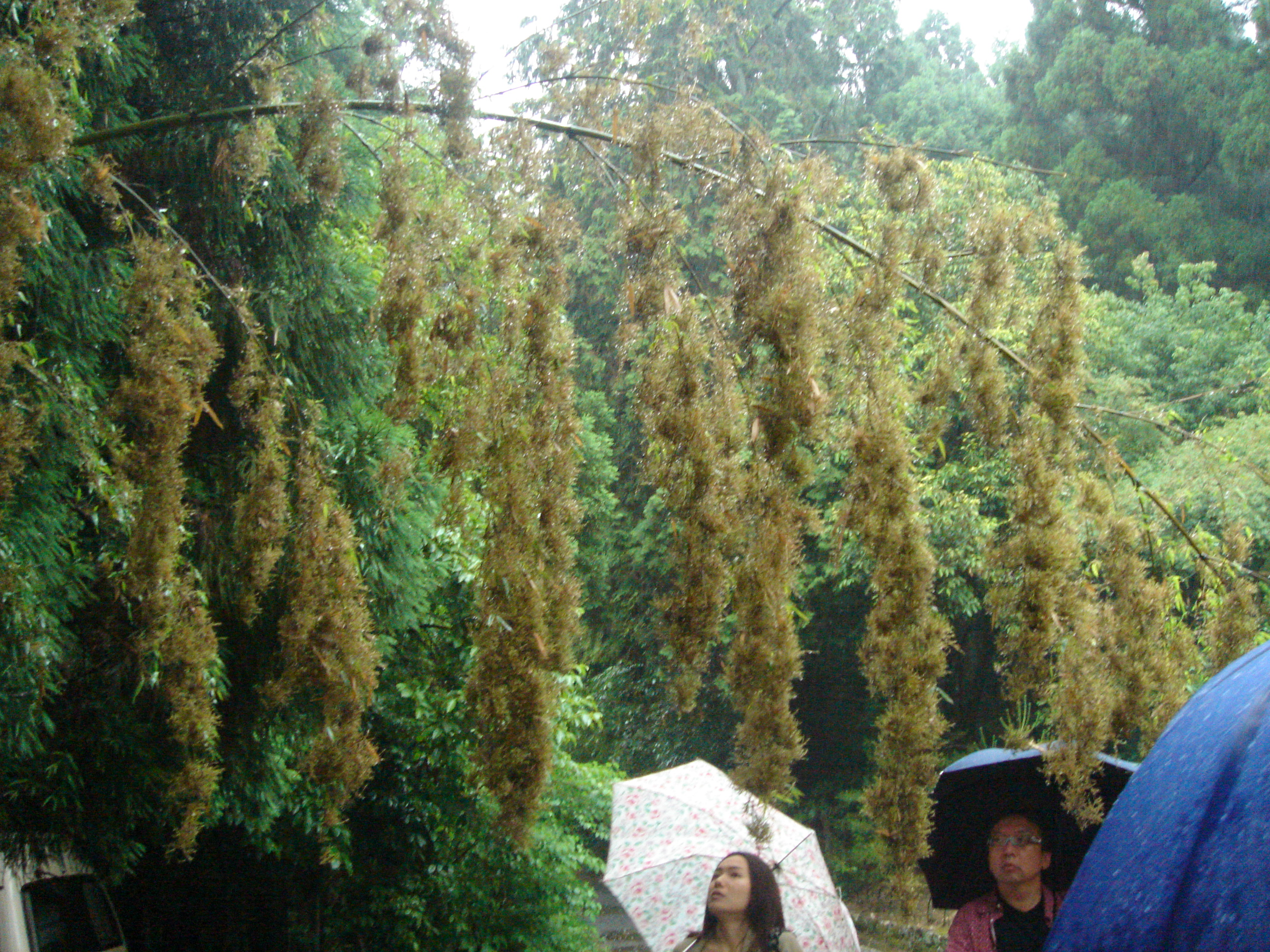
Flowering bamboo

Bamboo blossoming is a natural phenomenon in which the bamboos in a location flower or "blossom" and become hung with bamboo seeds. Most flowering plant species blossom annually, or more than once a year, but bamboo is unusual in that the plants only flower at intervals of several years, and do so synchronously. Bamboos are monocarpic, dying after flowering and setting seed.

== Phenomenon ==
Bamboos usually have a life cycle around 40 to 80 years, varying among species. Normally, new bamboos grow up from bamboo shoots at the roots. At infrequent intervals for most species, they will start to blossom. After blossom, flowers produce fruit (called "bamboo rice" in parts of India and China). Following this, the bamboo forest dies out. Since a bamboo forest is typically composed of a single species, the death of bamboos occurs in a large area.

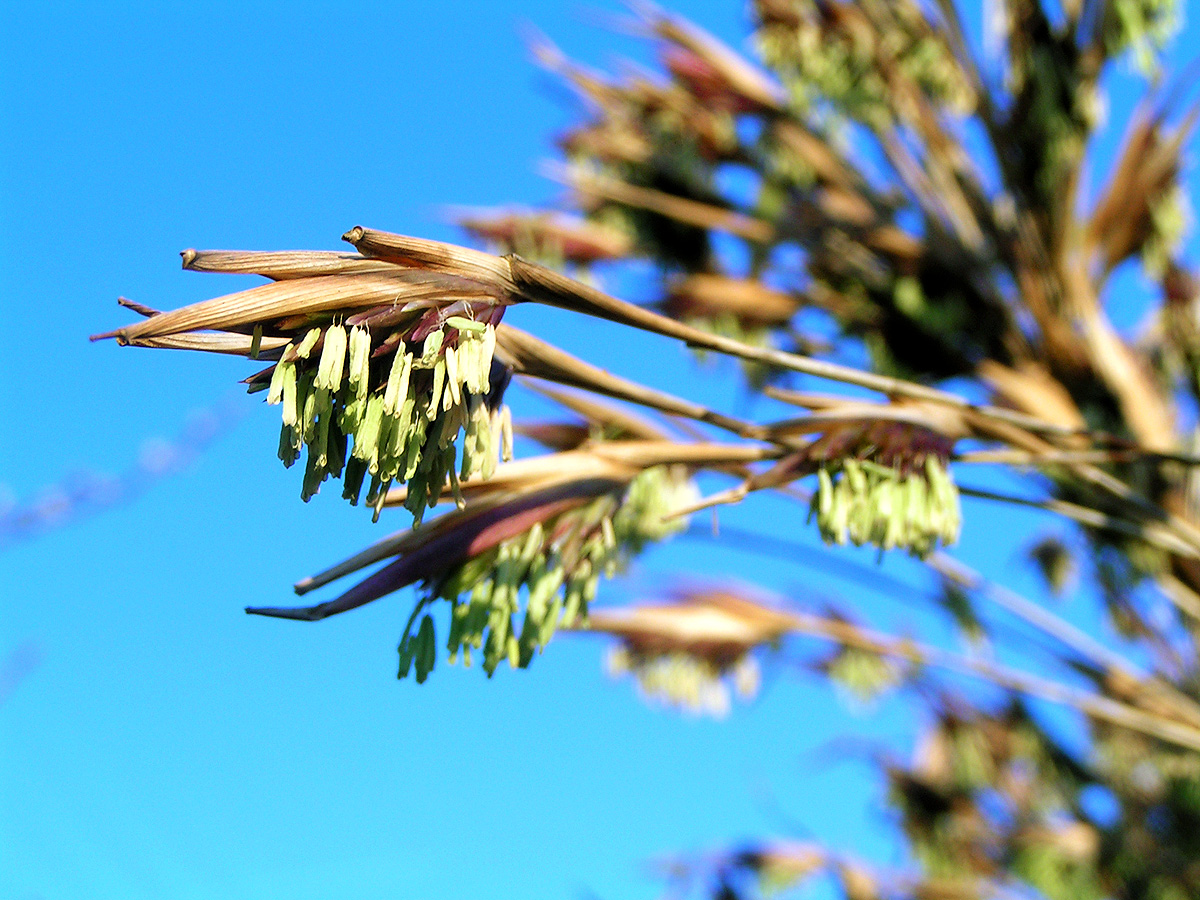
Close-up of bamboo flowers

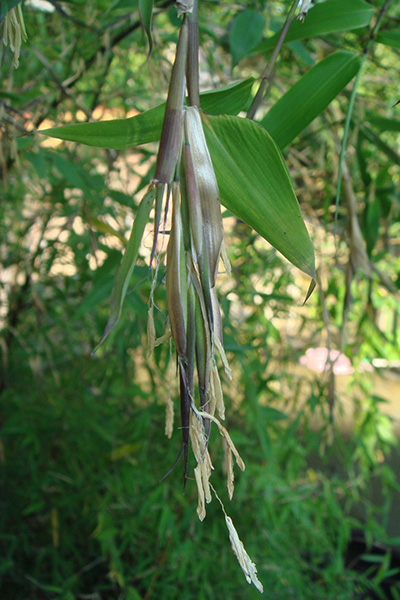
Phyllostachys glauca 'Yunzhu' flowers

Many bamboo species flower at extremely long intervals such as 65 or even 120 years. These taxa exhibit mass flowering (or gregarious flowering), with all plants in a particular cohort flowering over a several-year period. Any plant derived through clonal propagation from this cohort will also flower regardless of whether it has been planted in a different location. The longest mass flowering interval known is 130 years, for the species Phyllostachys bambusoides (Sieb. & Zucc.). In this species, all plants of the same stock flower at the same time, regardless of differences in geographic locations or climatic conditions, and then die. The lack of environmental impact on the time of flowering indicates the presence of some sort of "alarm clock" in each cell of the plant which signals the cessation of vegetative growth and the diversion of all energy to flower production. This mechanism, as well as the evolutionary cause behind it, is still largely a mystery.

Bamboo flowers mainly use wind pollination, which is largely sufficient when mass flowering occurs. For Dendrocalamus stocks that flower out of sync, pollination limitation (under-pollination) may occur but can be corrected by hand-pollinating. D. membranaceus and D. sinicus are self-compatible but largely outcrossing. Honey bees serve as effective pollinators.

== Possible evolutionary causes ==
One hypothesis to explain the evolution of this semelparous mass flowering phenomenon is the predator satiation hypothesis, which argues that by fruiting at the same time, a population increases the survival rate of their seeds by flooding the area with fruit. Therefore, even if predators eat their fill, seeds will still be left over. By having a flowering cycle longer than the lifespan of the rodent predators, bamboos can regulate animal populations by causing starvation during the period between flowering events. Thus, the death of the adult clone is due to resource exhaustion, as it would be more effective for parent plants to devote all resources to creating a large seed crop than to hold back energy for their own regeneration.

Another hypothesis, called the fire cycle hypothesis, argues that periodic flowering followed by death of the adult plants has evolved as a mechanism to create disturbance in the habitat, thus providing the seedlings with a gap in which to grow. This argues that the dead culms create a large fuel load, and also a large target for lightning strikes, increasing the likelihood of wildfire. Because bamboos can be aggressive as early successional plants, the seedlings would be able to outstrip other plants and take over the space left by their parents.

However, both have been disputed for different reasons. The predator satiation hypothesis does not explain why the flowering cycle is 10 times longer than the lifespan of the local rodents, something not predicted. The bamboo fire cycle hypothesis is considered by a few scientists to be unreasonable; they argue that fires only result from humans and no natural fires occur in India. This notion is considered wrong based on distribution of lightning strike data during the dry season throughout India. However, another argument against this is the lack of precedent for any living organism to harness something as unpredictable as lightning strikes to increase its chance of survival as part of natural evolutionary progress.

More recently, a mathematical explanation for the extreme length of the flowering cycles has been offered, involving both the stabilising selection implied by the predator satiation hypothesis and others, and the fact that plants that flower at longer intervals tend to release more seeds. The hypothesis claims that bamboo flowering intervals grew by integer multiplication. A mutant bamboo plant flowering at a noninteger multiple of its population's flowering interval would release its seeds alone, and would not enjoy the benefits of collective flowering (such as protection from predators). However, a mutant bamboo plant flowering at an integer multiple of its population's flowering interval would release its seeds only during collective flowering events, and would release more seeds than the average plant in the population. It could, therefore, take over the population, establishing a flowering interval that is an integer multiple of the previous flowering interval. The hypothesis predicts that observed bamboo flowering intervals should be relatively smooth numbers, which factorize into small prime numbers.

== Impact ==
=== Ecology and animals ===
The mass fruiting also has direct economic and ecological consequences, however. For example, devastating consequences occur when the Melocanna bambusoides population flowers and fruits once every 30–35 years around the Bay of Bengal. The death of the bamboo plants following their fruiting means the local people lose their building material, and the large increase in bamboo fruit leads to a rapid increase in rodent populations. As the number of rodents increases, they consume all available food, including grain fields and stored food, sometimes leading to famine. These rats can also carry dangerous diseases, such as typhus, typhoid, and bubonic plague, which can reach epidemic proportions as the rodents increase in number. The relationship between rat populations and bamboo flowering was examined in a 2009 Nova documentary Rat Attack.

The sudden death of large areas of bamboo puts pressure on animals that depend on bamboo as a food source, such as the endangered giant panda. It has also been hypothesized that ancestors of the domesticated chicken adapted to this sporadic burst of food supply by aggressively laying eggs when the blossom and seed dispersal occurs.

=== Bamboo genetics ===
Flowering produces large quantities of seeds, typically suspended from the ends of the branches. These seeds give rise to a new generation of plants that may be identical in appearance to those that preceded the flowering, or they may produce new cultivars with different characteristics, such as the presence or absence of striping or other changes in coloration of the culms. Flowering represents a form of sexual representation, which generates more genetic diversity than clonal propagation. Conversely, the rarity of flowering events make it harder to artificially create new breeds of bamboo by sexual reproduction.

"It is possible to predict bamboo flowering by analyzing environmental factors such as temperature, humidity, and rainfall, intrinsic biological rhythms of specific bamboo species, and the morphology of bamboo rhizomes." Some chemicals such as auxin–cytokinin and ABA are known to induce flowering in vitro but have not been used on whole plants. Bamboo pollen can be preserved as genetic material useful for future breeding efforts, allowing populations that flower out of sync or even different species to be crossed.

Several bamboo species are never known to set seed even when sporadically flowering has been reported. Bambusa vulgaris, Bambusa balcooa, and Dendrocalamus stocksii are common examples of such bamboo.

As an alternative to sexual reproduction, genetic engineering may be used to directly incorporate desired traits.

== See also ==
- Mautam
