= Sirochloa =

Scientific classification
- Kingdom: Plantae
- Clade: Tracheophytes
- Clade: Angiosperms
- Clade: Monocots
- Clade: Commelinids
- Order: Poales
- Family: Poaceae
- Subfamily: Bambusoideae
- Tribe: Bambuseae
- Subtribe: Hickeliinae
- Genus: Sirochloa; S.Dransf.
- Species: S. parvifolia

Binomial name
- Sirochloa parvifolia (Munro) S.Dransf.

Synonyms
- Schizostachyum parvifolium Munro; Schizostachyum bosseri A.Camus

Genus of grasses

Sirochloa is a genus of bamboo in the grass family. There is only one known species, Sirochloa parvifolia, native to Madagascar and the nearby Comoros and Mayotte.
