= C. Rokhuma =

Mizo researcher and author (1917–2016)

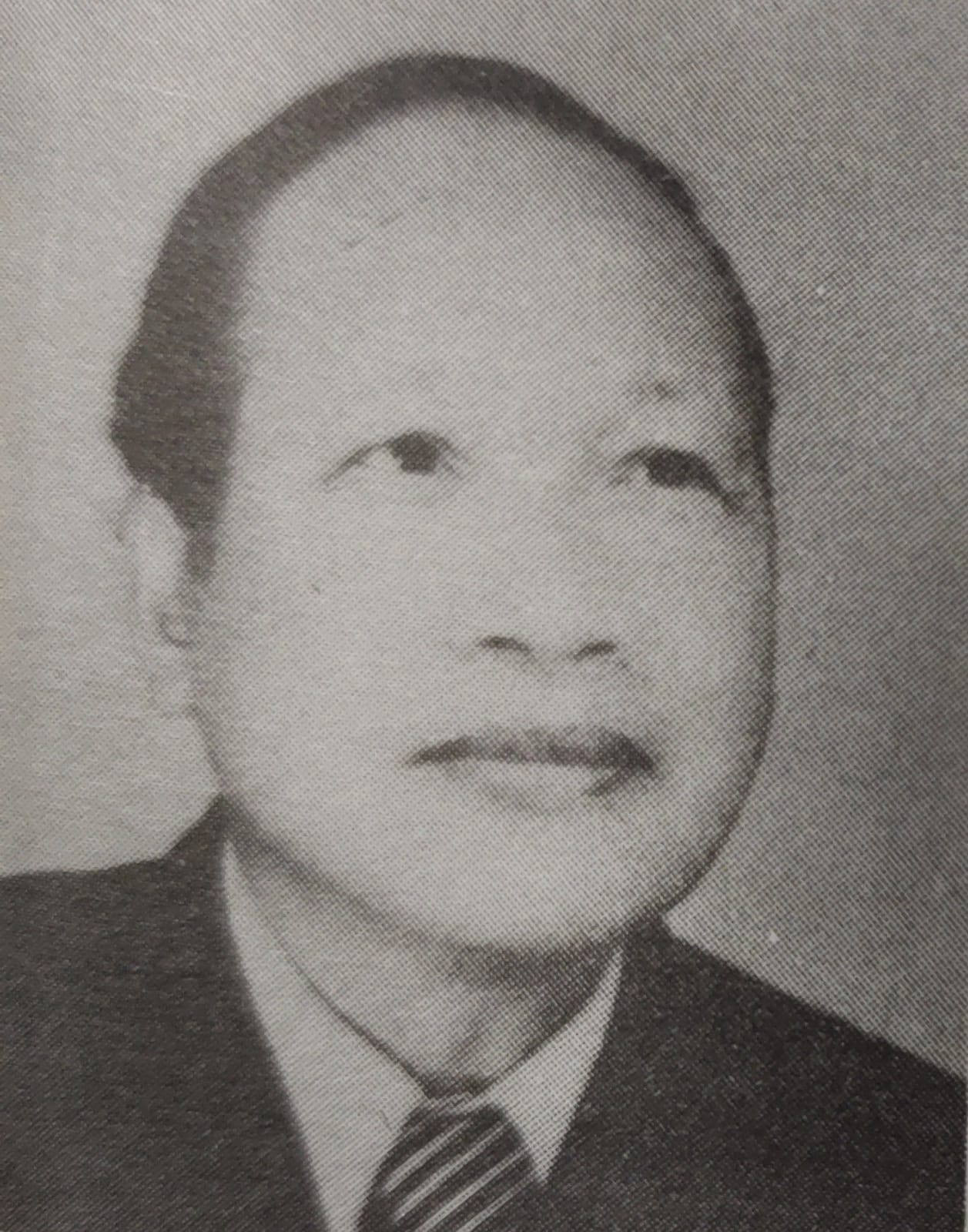
- Chuauhang Rokhuma Padma Shri Portrait
- Born: 21 July 1917; Reiek Village
- Died: November 23, 2016 (aged 99); Aizawl
- Occupations: Mizo scientist and author
- Known for: Padma Shri

Chuauhang Rokhuma (21 July 1917 – 23 November 2016) was a Mizo scientist and author. He is most well known for his work in researching agriculture and the mautam famine.

== Early life ==
C Rokhuma was born on 21 July 1917 in Reiek village. He was only educated up to Grade 8, but continued to read books and educate himself. He was married to Lalrinthangi in 1939.

== Career ==
Rokhuma began his career in 1934 as a teacher. He became a sub-inspector of schools in 1946. During World War 2, Rokhuma also served in the military. In 1951, Rokhuma founded the Anti-Famine Campaign Organisation to combat the mautam famine. Rokhuma functioned as its organising secretary. As a non-political organisation, it attracted members of both the Mizo Union and United Mizo Freedom Organisation. The organisation undertook plans and measures to reduce the impact of the mautam famine in anticipation of its cyclical resurgence. Rokhuma invented an insecticide he termed as RK Mixture, to help orange farmers fight insects attacking their crops. RK Mixture was also utilised for sugarcane. From 1955-1966, Rokhuma became an Instructor at a Teacher's college and then transitioned into a Sunday School Teacher Training Instructor at MSSU from 1967. In 1978, Rokhuma founded the Mizo Writer's Association and authored books and translations from English to Mizo.

In 1992, the Government of India awarded him the Padma Shri in recognition of his social work. Rokhuma continued to research rats and their behaviour in a laboratory to study the effects of mautam.

Rokhuma was assigned deputy chairman of the State Rodent Control Committee, headed by Zoramthanga. In 2009 when the mautam famine cycled back, Rokhuma was sought after by local, national and international media on the topic of bamboo flowering.

== Later life ==
Rokhuma was admitted to Aizawl hospital in the ICU on 15 November 2016. He would be transferred to a private ward before dying on 23 November 2016.

== Works ==
- Rokhuma, C. (1973). India Hmar Chhak (Hmanah-Assam) Ram Thu: Pawl Thum Zirlai Bu [Geography of North East India (Formerly-Assam): A Grade Three Textbook]. Aizawl: Synod Bookroom.
- Rokhuma, C. (1975). Bomb sakei leh Bible: tun lai ralthuam hlauhawmte [Bomb tigers and the Bible: Modern weapons of mass destruction]. Aizawl: Rokhuma.
- Rokhuma, C. (1980). Zoram Parmawi [Beauty of Mizoram]. Aizawl: Education Department.
- Rokhuma, C. (1985). Phawngpui Kawng [Phawngpui road]. Aizawl: CT Printers.
- Rokhuma, C. (1988). The secret of Famines found. Aizawl: Gosen Press.

== Sources ==
- Assam Tribune (23 November 2016). "Mizo scientist C Rokhuma dead". The Assam Tribune.
- Vanlalfakawma, David. C. (23 November 2017). "Upa C. Rokhuma". Bambu Sapiens (in Mizo).
- Associated Press (17 November 2006). "Bamboo Blooms, rat population booms in India". NBC News.
- AtMigration (12 July 1999). "Mizoram at war against rats. Hunt down the vermins or face a famine". India Today.
- Nag, Sajal (2008). Pied Pipers in North-East India: Bamboo-flowers, Rat-famine and the Politics of Philanthropy. (1881–2007)=New Delhi. Manohar Publishers & Distributors. ISBN 978-81-7304-311-6.
- Nag, Sajal (March 2001). "Tribals, Rats, Famine, State and the Nation". Economic and Political Weekly. 36 (12): 1029–1033. JSTOR 4410428.
