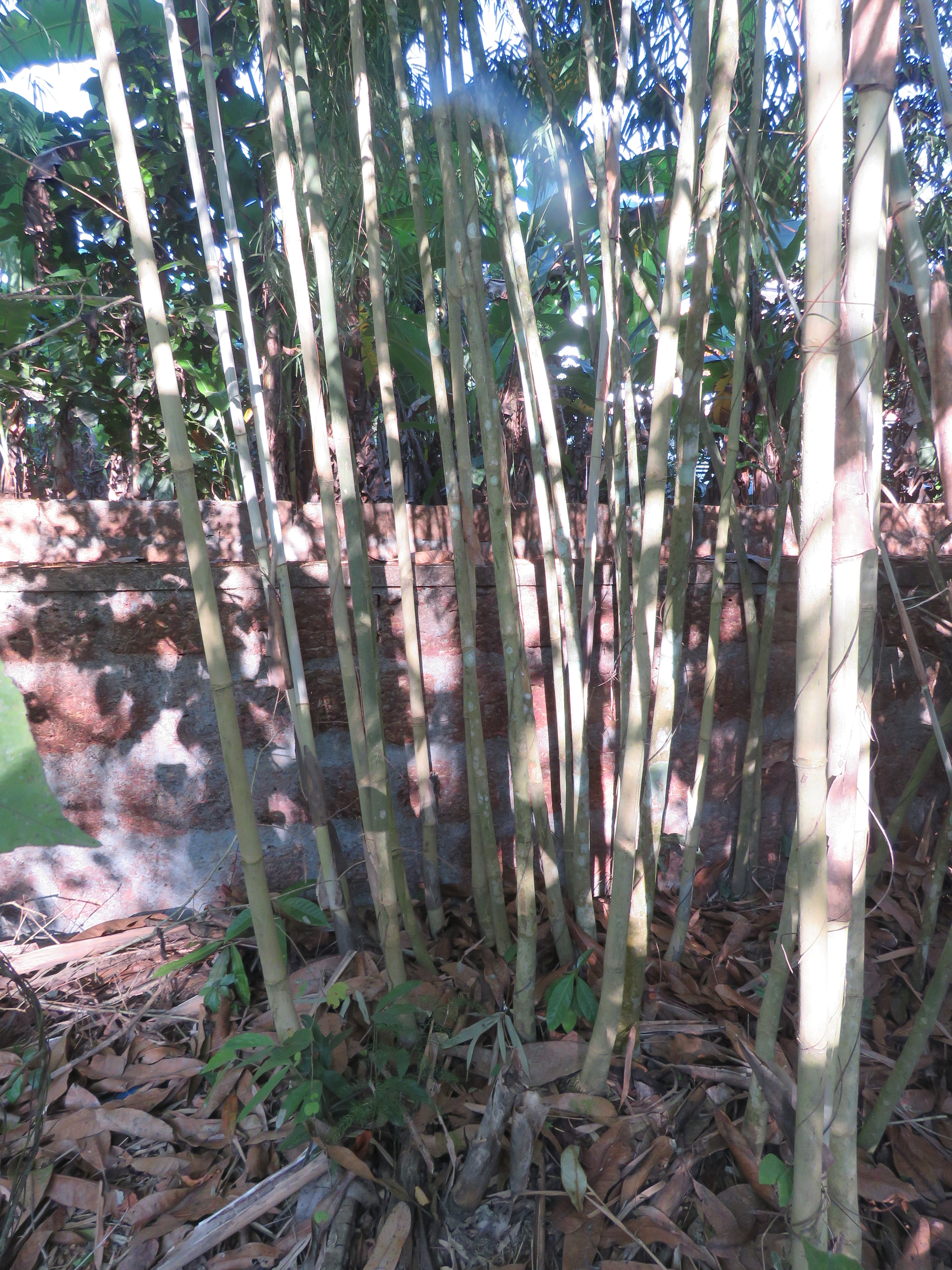

Scientific classification
- Kingdom: Plantae
- Clade: Tracheophytes
- Clade: Angiosperms
- Clade: Monocots
- Clade: Commelinids
- Order: Poales
- Family: Poaceae
- Genus: Pseudoxytenanthera
- Species: P. ritcheyi

Binomial name
- Pseudoxytenanthera ritcheyi (Munro) H.B.Naithani

Synonyms
- Schizostachyum hindostanicum Kurz; Pseudotenanthera ritcheyi (Munro) R.B.Majumdar; Oxytenanthera ritcheyi (Munro) Blatt. & McCann; Oxytenanthera monostigma Bedd. Bambusa ritcheyi Munro; Arundarbor ritcheyi (Munro) Kuntze

= Pseudoxytenanthera ritcheyi =

Species of plant

Pseudoxytenanthera ritcheyi is a species of plant belonging to the genus Pseudoxytenanthera of the grass family, Poaceae. It is an Asian bamboo commonly called the "erankol". The species grows in wild in the plains and foothills of South Indian regions.

== Description ==
Pseudoxytenanthera ritcheyi is a type of bamboo and its solid stem is very strong. It is grown as a building material.
