= Kinabaluchloa wrayi =

Scientific classification
- Kingdom: Plantae
- Clade: Tracheophytes
- Clade: Angiosperms
- Clade: Monocots
- Clade: Commelinids
- Order: Poales
- Family: Poaceae
- Genus: Kinabaluchloa
- Species: K. wrayi

Binomial name
- Kinabaluchloa wrayi (Stapf) K.M.Wong 1993

Synonyms
- Bambusa wrayi Stapf 1893; Cephalostachyum chevalieri A.Camus 1943

Species of plant

Kinabaluchloa wrayi is a bamboo species endemic to the montane rainforests of Borneo. Its most remarkable feature is the length of its internodes which can be up to 200 cm (6.6 ft) in the lowest internode, gradually diminishing as the culm ascends to a mature height of up to 18 m (59 ft). The young culms are covered with black hairs.
