= Ohe (Allna) =

River in Hesse, Germany

Location
- Country: Germany
- State: Hesse

Physical characteristics
- Mouth
  - location: Allna
  - coordinates: 50.7850°N 8.6899°E
- Length: 11.4 km (7.1 mi)

Basin features
- Progression: Allna→ Lahn→ Rhine→ North Sea

Ohe is a river of Hesse, Germany. It flows into the Allna in Hermershausen.

== See also ==
- List of rivers of Hesse
