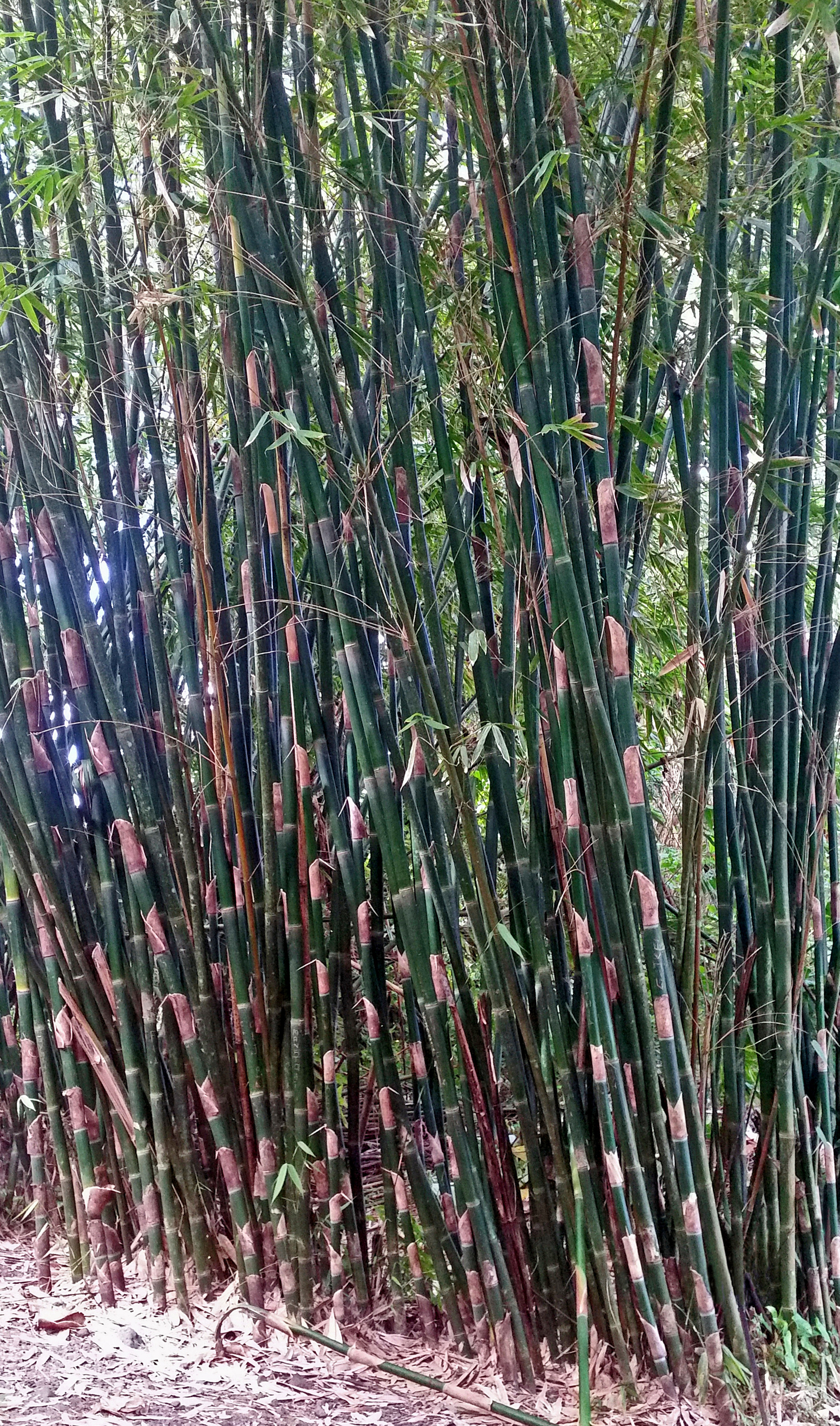

Conservation status
- Least Concern (IUCN 3.1)

Scientific classification
- Kingdom: Plantae
- Clade: Embryophytes
- Clade: Tracheophytes
- Clade: Angiosperms
- Clade: Monocots
- Clade: Commelinids
- Order: Poales
- Family: Poaceae
- Genus: Schizostachyum
- Species: S. glaucifolium

Binomial name
- Schizostachyum glaucifolium (Rupr.) Munro

Synonyms
- Bambos arundo Sol., pro syn.; Bambusa glaucifolia Rupr.

= Schizostachyum glaucifolium =

Species of grass

Schizostachyum glaucifolium, common name Polynesian ʻohe, is a species of bamboo.

== Distribution ==
This species is native to the South-Central Pacific, from the Marquesas Islands and Society Islands in French Polynesia, as well as in the Southwestern Pacific in the Samoan Islands and Fiji. It is an introduced species in Hawaii.

== Habitat ==
This species prefers tropical or subtropical climates. It can be found mainly along the banks of rivers and streams and on hillsides, at an elevation of 0–900 metres (0–2,953 ft) above sea level.

== Description ==
Schizostachyum glaucifolium can reach a typical height of 15 metres (49 ft) and a culm diameter of 8 centimetres (3.1 in). This evergreen clump-forming bamboo shows thin walls, long internodes and yellow woody culms with green stripes.

== Human culture ==
These bamboos have been used by ancient Polynesians in present day French Polynesia and Tonga for its many uses (baskets, mats, musical instruments, small containers, fishing rods, etc.).

Samoans consider its (known as ʻofe in Samoan) shoots as a sign of misfortune and doom.

== Importance ==
On the French Polynesian island of Mo'orea, thickets of these bamboo are likely the exclusive breeding habitat of the Moorea reed warbler. Development, overharvesting, and the invasive Miconia have severely depleted these thickets, and the warbler is now critically endangered.

== See also ==
- Domesticated plants and animals of Austronesia
