= Mautam =

Cyclic ecological phenomenon

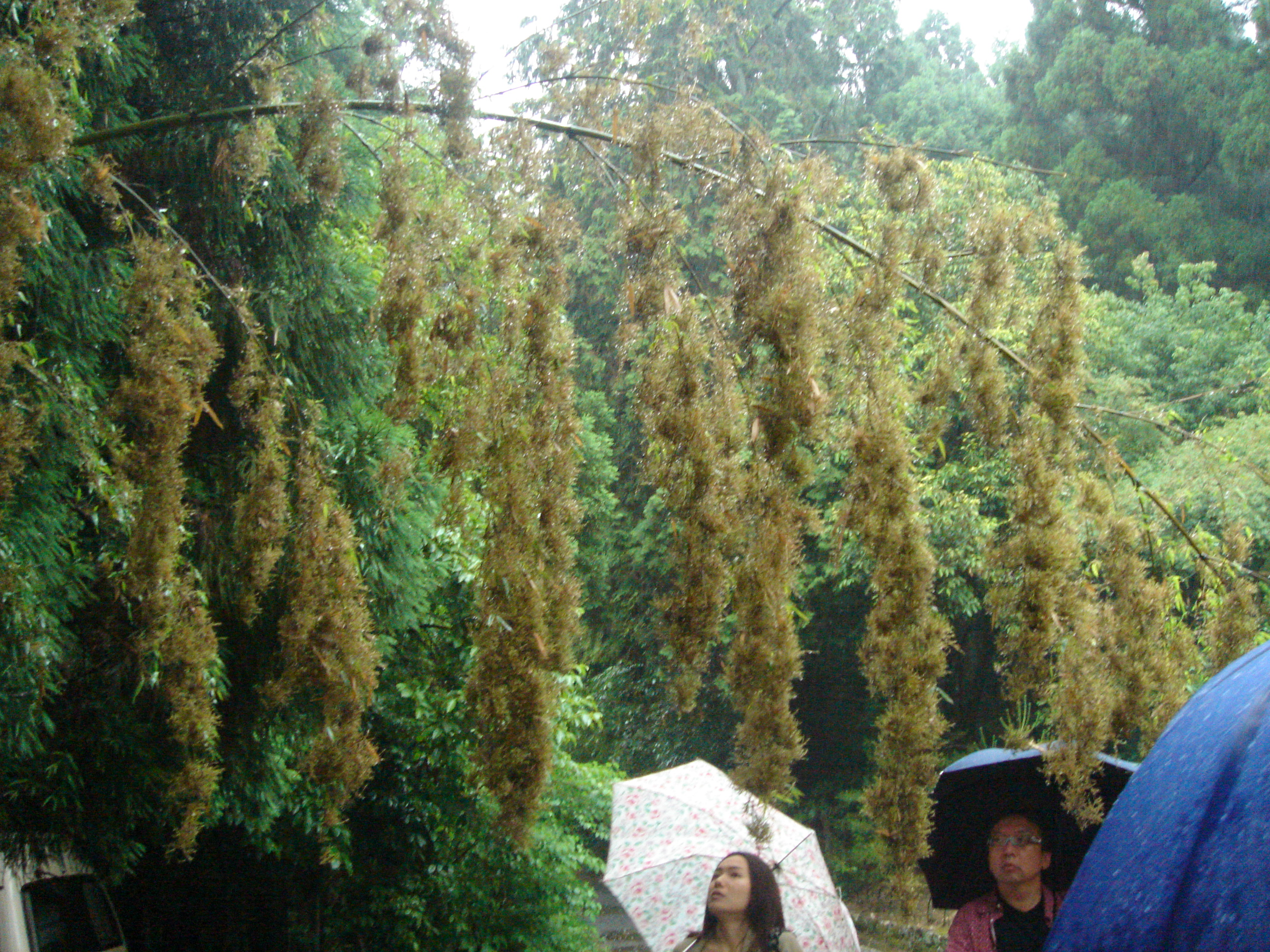
Flowering bamboo

Mautam (mautâm, lit. 'The Finish of Mau Bamboo') is a cyclic ecological phenomenon that occurs every 48–50 years in the northeastern Indian states of Tripura, Mizoram and Manipur, as well as in many places of Assam which are 30% covered by wild bamboo forests, and Chin State in Myanmar, particularly Hakha, Thantlang, Falam, Paletwa and Matupi Townships. It begins with a rat population boom, which in turn creates a widespread famine in those areas.

During mautam, Melocanna baccifera, a species of bamboo, flowers at one time across a wide area. This event is followed invariably by a plague of black rats in what is called a rat flood. The bamboo flowering brings a temporary windfall of seeds, and rats multiply, exhaust the bamboo seeds, leave the forests, forage on stored grain, and cause devastating famine.

Regular rodent outbreaks associated with bamboo flowering (and subsequent fruiting and seeding) also occur in the nearby Indian states of Arunachal Pradesh, Assam, Manipur, and Nagaland, as well as in Laos, Japan, Madagascar, and South America. Thingtâm, a similar famine, occurs with the flowering of another species of bamboo, Bambusa tulda.

== Characteristics ==
There are two versions of these famines. Both concern bamboo plants, one species known as Mau and another known as Thing hence the two famines being known as Mautam and Thingtam. Mautam and thingtam have been observed to strictly alternate, with a gap of 18 years from mautam to thingtam and a gap of 30 years from thingtam to mautam. Locals have described the swarming of an insect, a true bug called thangang (Udonga montana), preceding all instances of mautam. Zoologists believe that the flowering of the bamboo attracts the migration of insects into the region hence acting as a signal.

Recorded instances of mautam include 1864, 1910–1912, 1958–1959, and 2007–2008 and those of thingtam include 1880–1884, 1928–1929, 1976–1977, and 2025-2026. The next predicted events if this pattern continues are mautam in 2055–2056 and thingtam in 2073-2074.

In 1911 under Superintendent F.C Henniker, the missionary James Herbert Lorrain and Mizo elders, a report on the full extent of mautam and bamboo and associated indigenous knowledge was compiled. The different species of bamboo in the Lushai Hills were recorded and differentiated.

== History ==
=== Precolonial mautam ===
Due to the cyclical nature of mautam and thingtam occurring, there is little doubt about famines occurring before 1860. It is speculated for this reason, previous inhabitants of the Lushai Hills left or evacuated due to the pressure of food insecurity.

=== 1860-1861 mautam famine ===
The British took notice of the changes in the Lushai Hills around the time of the first recorded mautam in 1860. The British described the previously bulky survivors as lean and thin beyond description. The observations were validated with a supporting report from Manipur detailing the effects of mautam. Apart from standard observation, the British elaborate little on the early mautam famine. The bamboo flowering affected the Lushai Hills, southern Manipur and the Cachar region. Colonel McCulloch of Manipur reported as early as 1858 on the mass flowering of bamboo and how an increase in rodent population had led to unrest in the region. The onset of the 1860 mautam famine led to the decline and dissolution of Old Tualte, a famous settlement of 1000 households under Chief Vanhnuailiana.

=== 1881-1882 thingtam famine ===
The onset of the mautam famine in 1881 led to the end of the East-West War. An immigration of 80 families and around 400 people immigrated out of Khalkam's settlement into the plains. The settlers under Khalkam who belonged to the Rangte subclan arrived in Cachar and settled near the Dharmakal tea estate. Their arrival was followed by another mass migration of men from the chiefs Poiboi, Lalhai and Chunglena. Countless areas such as Tipaimukh, Jalnacherra, Akai settlement, and Hailakandi Valley were settled by Lushai refugees, with some even arriving in rafts from the Tlawng River. The arrival of the refugees alarmed the British administration, whose tea planters considered them synonymous with raiders. The immigrants were investigated and revealed their intention to trade all their products in return for food and rice. Several chiefs sold out their ivory jewellery, guns and rubber deposits from the trees after their jhums had been exhausted. The immigrants themselves traded all their products, such as bamboo, cane and rubber, in return for food. The Western chiefs under Khalkam met with the Eastern chiefs under Poiboi and Lalhai to end the conflict and jointly request British aid for the famine. The upas of the chiefs met with Knox Wight, the deputy commissioner of Cachar. The famine also oversaw a large immigration of Lushais from the hills into regions such as Cachar and Chittagong to offset the famine's effects. Some individuals even agreed to partake as coolies in return for regular payments in rice. As a result, the local officers of Cachar and Chittagong forwarded the matter to Shillong and Calcutta. As a result, the Government of India authorised the Chief Commissioner to take the necessary steps.

The Assistance Commissioner of Cachar, Mr Place and Rai Bahadur Hari Charan Sarma visited the Lushai Hills to report the amount of rice aid required through the observable population. Rai Bahadur was acquainted with the Lushai and knew of their language, customs and their chiefs. Rai Habadur left on 11 November 1881 to conduct a survey of the population. Midway through November the upas from chiefs Lalsavenga, Sailenpui, Banaitangi and Lengpunga met with Rai Bahadur with requests for food. Apart from the rice paddies, the rats had devoured their grain storages as well. Interviews with refugees in Jalnacherra revealed their previous settlement under chieftainess Pibuk (mother of Sukpilal) before moving to Banaitangi and Ratanpui (a son of Sukpilal) upon her death. The refugees requested permission to jhum on British territory but were not permitted to do so. He met with an encampment of 100 households at Pakuacherra who had been without food for two days. Further on his survey, Rai Bahadur met with 100 men on 15 bamboo rafts with sick malnourished children. Ratanpui's settlement of 600 people was reported to be surviving off of leaves, roots and fruits. The chiefs wished the riverine bazaars and traders to reopen their markets and sell them food, which they could repay with the next jhum harvest. Rai Bahadur was appointed in charge of famine relief operations. His experience in famine relief described the deaths of many, the emaciation of the elderly and children and the number of individuals leaving their settlements to the plains to secure better sources of food. His subsequent reports would state that no alternative form of food is available for the Lushais whose crops were destroyed. A report detailed a population of 30,000 in the South Lushai Hills, when accounting for smaller diets in children the number was closed in to 20,000. According to the calculations of half a seer of rice per head, 22500 maunds of rice are required for a period of three months.

British intelligence reports from J. Knox Wight hinted at the desperation of tribes to prepare raiding on the bordering settlements in Cachar, Tripura and Manipur. Further insight revealed that many of the older generations and chiefs were against this way of procuring food. The British provided relief to the refugees but considered the possibility of invading the Lushai Hills and ending all future hostilities the raiders might bring once more. Points against the invasion included helping the chiefs form good relations with the British, preventing permanent settlements of refugees in British territory, requiring the foresight of the Government of India in regard to territory changes and the futility of past expeditions in conquering tribes in the unfamiliar terrain. The British found it advantageous to advance into the Lushai Hills under friendly overtures to study the geography, culture and politics of the unknown frontier. Rai Bahadur supported this plan of action as he was sympathetic to the plight of the Lushais under famine.

The next harvest for the Lushai Hills was estimated to be July 1882. Rai Bahadur further requested aid from the Government of India who obliged. As a result, a budget of r 50,000 was granted for relief operations. Rai Bahadur made suggestions which were followed through, including two warehouses of rice. Each warehouse would have a capacity of storing 1000 maunds of rice paddy. The government of Assam also gave orders to the mirasdars and other well off cultivators to redirect their rice to the Lushai Hills aid relief operations. The rice was awarded to Lushai individuals as loans by the British. Able-bodied Lushai were to be employed as coolies working on the construction of roads in return for payments in rice. The Cachar side famine relief supplied 20,000 maunds of paddy.

The Chittagong frontier under the Government of Bengal also supported famine relief operations. The Lushai-Kukis in the Chittagong Hill Tracts were also suffering from the local effects of mautam. With the support of F. Knox Wight, the Chief Commissioner of Shillong contacted the Lieutenant Governor of Bengal, Sir Bailey who agreed to help. All of the officers of the Government of Bengal were in agreement on the policy forward except for John Edgar the chief secretary. The lieutenant governor of Bengal, Sir Bayley, authorised officers for the creation of grain storage at Demagiri and other stations. The reasoning for the policy centred around an interest in maintaining friendly relations with the Lushai frontier. Furthermore, the aid policy would enable the British to bypass the upas of the chiefs and establish karbaris with the chiefs instead. Karbaris were established with the Howlong chiefs and supplied with an allowance. Further reports into the famine led to the government constructing a map of the affected areas. The famine had affected nearly all of the hills and the encompassed Howlong, Sailo, Thangluaha and Reangs. On 5 March 1882, E. Lowie submitted a report detailing about 3000 houses requiring aid, which would amount to 14000 maunds total. Grain storage sites were established across sites such as Demagiri, Kassalong, and Fiskisiva.

=== 1910-1911 mautam famine ===
The 1910-1911 mautam famine was preceded by a locust swarm (thangnang) which engulfed trees and created a noise described as a monsoon. The arrival of Halley's Comet at the same time also induced a bad omen at the time of many chiefs and elders. However, the excessive proliferation of locusts did not result in any consumption of food or trees. Individuals would scoop up the locusts in buckets and use the fatty oils or the bugs themselves as delicacies.

Following the progression of mautam, the rat population did not boom equally across the Lushai Hills; the inhabitants between the Tuirini and Khawchhak Tuipui rivers were affected first by the mautam famine. However, the successful harvest of the year saw an excess of crops and grains that were stored away and used to offset the effects of the booming rat population. These excess storages, however, were localised to a few prominent settlements. The remaining rice paddies of the autumn season were devoured by rats.

Since the Lushai Hills were under the sovereignty of the British Raj, the government took initiative in combating the phenomenon. They rewarded the killing of rats, proven by the production of their tails, and a report of 1912-1913 detailed that 179,015 rat tails were produced as a result. Locally-made rat traps were also implemented preemptively to prevent the famine. Because the excess food stored in Bunghmun village could not be accessed by many other villages at the time, the government sent food via ferries and boats from Demagiri, Sairang and Tipaimukh to the harder-to-reach areas of the Lushai Hills. The rice was loaned to individuals as a relief; if the interest and principal could not be paid back, then individuals were expected to work as a coolie in forced labour for the British. The main structures built by the coolies were a water storage tank in Aizawl. In some cases, even if individuals paid off their loan and interest for the rice aid, then they would still be required to partake in forced labour for the British for those who were not able-bodied and failed to pay. The unpopularity of the conditions led to another migration where individuals migrated to Lakhipur in Cachar and Tripura. Hrangvanga Sailo led a migration to Tripura in 1912 where they permanently remained in Tripura even after the decline of the mautam famine.

=== 1959 mautam famine ===
In 1951, the Anti-Famine Campaign Organization was formed under C. Rokhuma in anticipation of the upcoming mautam. The organisation would be organised with a chairman headed by Lalmawia, a vice chairman headed by H. Khuma, the organising secretary under C. Rokhuma, Pacchunga as treasurer, Lalbiaka as secretary and Vanthuama as a member. As an apolitical organisation, it attracted members from the Mizo Union and United Mizo Freedom Organization.

In 1954, the AFCO met with the Supply Minister of Assam to warn about the upcoming Mautam. The minister, who did not believe that a flowering bamboo plant could lead to a rat population surge and induce a famine, instead passed the warnings off as a superstition, though assurances were granted that if a famine did occur, aid would be provided. In 1957, the rat population in Mizoram had been observed to grow. The district council had also counterintuitively banned pesticides, which was overturned with pressure from the AFCO.

The mautam famine occurred earlier than expected in the cyclical phenomenon predictions. The flowers had been observed since 1957 and reports of rat swarms in search of bamboo fruits came from every area of Mizoram along with damages to rice paddies. Fortnightly reports were submitted to the central government on the crop conditions and rat populations.

As a result, a plant protection department was created under the suggestion of Sundaram Pillai, the Plant Protection Officer of the North-East region. The Mizo District Council further delegated anti-famine operations to the Anti-Famine Organization. The use, responsibility, procurement and distribution of rat poison was under the organisation's authority. Public service programs educated individuals and village councils on how to use poison baits properly.

On 29 October 1958, the district council passed a unanimous resolution to source precautionary funds for the famine and to test relief strategies. However, B.P. Chaliha, the Chief Minister of Assam, ignored the resolution along with most other Assamese officials. They did not believe that a bamboo flowering could lead to famine at the time and withheld support for precautionary measures.

The famine began in December 1958 and hit the people east of the Turini River. In 1959, since the Assam Government failed to recognise the famine officially, aid was withheld. The rat population surged, devouring crops and destroying rice storage units. Deaths were reported in Souther Mizoram among the Mara and Lai communities. In the east, Chakma and Reang people were reported to be surviving on wild arul (grass).

Finally, after a financial commissioner visited Mizoram on January 19, 1959, and reported on the conditions, the Assam Government, under pressure from tribal welfare minister Williamson Sangma, officially recognised the famine. Though 150 jeeps of food was sent as immediate aid to the famine-affected areas, overall relief initially came slowly due to the Assam Government’s underestimating the famine’s impact. The raised tensions that resulted led to the district council of Mizoram classifying the Assam Government as incapable.

The government of Assam took on larger and substantial relief policies between the period of August 1959 to October 1960. Roads were constructed for jeeps and transport to reach settlements to supply emergency food relief. A relief program for the poor was made without any repayment obligations. Subsidies were introduced to increase the affordability of food and rice to increase access to relief. Medical aid for malnutrition and increased exposure to disease was also funded, and nutritious food programs were established for children. Agricultural schemes saw the free distribution of seeds and pesticides as well to encourage harvesting and subsistence farming. Further policies included famine relief vehicles, air dropping of food relief and construction of grain strorages. Planes such as Dakota used in World War Two were used for the airdropping. Supplies also came in by boat but this method was considered slow and inefficient for large scale relief. Roads became the preferred method as infrastructure favoured the major population centres such as Aizawl and Lunglei. Donations were also given from the Governor of Assam Relief fund, Chief Minister B.P. Chaliha, public donations, Indian Peoples Famine Trust Fund and the National Christian Council of India.

The nature of famine relief saw the Assam Government grant direct relief without the district council. Nag argues this was a political scheme to sideline the Mizo Union who were already declining from the 1957 election. When complaints of famine aid and relief raised, Chaliha blamed the Mizo Union for non-cooperation. The Assam Government would subsequently deny cases of starvation deaths reported by the district council. Several factors, such as a lack of infrastructure in urban settlements were the reason. Jeeps carrying food aid could only reliably pass through Aizawl and Lungleh. Outer areas such as Demagiri and Champhai, and North Vanlaiphai require walking. At the same time, many complaints stemmed from the Chakma and Reang, who argued that the Mizo Christians were being prioritized over those who were Buddhist and Hindu. As Chaliha continued to offset the Mizo Union's participation in relief efforts, they turned to the newly created Mizo Cultural Council which under Laldenga had been converted to the Mizo National Famine Front.

The MNFF reaped credit for the food relief while being able to spread nationalist messages. Laldenga himself campaigned with a slogan of "Mizoram for Mizos" while distributing food relief. The bulk of the relief fund went into transport subsidies to deliver the food aid. Food aid was also taken as headloads; the difficult terrain meant that the amount of food able to be transported by hand would be 25kg at a distance of 15km. While airdropping of food was considered, the packaging was too defective for such an operation and would have led to wastage; the terrain and weather also affected ideal spots for air drops of food to the interior villages and settlements.

During the mautam period of 1958 and 1959, the Mizo National Famine Front (MNFF) was set up to provide relief to the far-flung areas. This body later became the Mizo National Front (MNF), which staged a major uprising in 1966. Under its leader Laldenga (who later became the chief minister of Mizoram), MNF fought a bitter separatist struggle for 20 years against the Indian Army until an accord that guaranteed Mizoram's autonomy as a separate state was signed in 1986.

== See also ==
- Bamboo blossom
- Population cycle

== Sources ==
- Chatterjee, Suhas (1985). British rule in Mizoram. New Delhi: Mittal Publications.
- Kumawat, M.M.; Singh, K.M. (2014). "Rodent outbreak in relation to bamboo flowering in north-eastern region of India". Biological Agriculture & Horticulture. 30 (4): 243–252. Bibcode:2014BioAH..30..243K. doi:10.1080/01448765.2014.925828. S2CID 84596075.
- Lalthangliana, B (2005). Culture and folklore of Mizoram. Publications Division Ministry of Information & Broadcasting. ISBN 978-81-230-2658-9.
- Lalthangliana, B (1989). Mizo Lal Ropui (in Mizo). Aizawl: R.T.M Press.
- Nag, Sajal (2008). Pied Pipers in North-East India: Bamboo-flowers, Rat-famine and the Politics of Philanthropy (1881-2007). New Delhi: Manohar Publishers & Distributors. ISBN 978-81-7304-311-6.
- Rokhuma, C. (1988). The secret of Famines found. Aizawl: Gosen Press.

== External links. ==
- Indian army's new enemy is rats, UK: BBC, 3 June 2006, "troops in the six north-eastern states of the country are used to dealing with insurgencies" but are now dealing with "an infestation of rats".
- Bamboo the life blood of the people: Alarm to Ecosystem, SOS arsenic.
- Mautaam in Manipur, archived from the original on 25 October 2011.
- "Rat Attack, Plant vs. Predator", NOVA (interview), PBS, 30 September 2008, "noted ecologist Daniel Janzen describes how Melocanna […] bamboo's strategy came about".
