= Kinabaluchloa =

Scientific classification
- Kingdom: Plantae
- Clade: Tracheophytes
- Clade: Angiosperms
- Clade: Monocots
- Clade: Commelinids
- Order: Poales
- Family: Poaceae
- Subfamily: Bambusoideae
- Tribe: Bambuseae
- Subtribe: Holttumochloinae
- Genus: Kinabaluchloa; K.M.Wong

Type species
- Kinabaluchloa wrayi (Stapf) K.M. Wong

Genus of grasses

Kinabaluchloa is a genus of Southeast Asian bamboos in the grass family.

Species

- Kinabaluchloa nebulosa K.M.Wong - Sabah, Brunei
- Kinabaluchloa wrayi (Stapf) K.M.Wong - Peninsular Malaysia, Thailand, Vietnam
