= Neohouzeaua =

Scientific classification
- Kingdom: Plantae
- Clade: Tracheophytes
- Clade: Angiosperms
- Clade: Monocots
- Clade: Commelinids
- Order: Poales
- Family: Poaceae
- Subfamily: Bambusoideae
- Tribe: Bambuseae
- Subtribe: Melocanninae
- Genus: Neohouzeaua; A.Camus

Type species
- Neohouzeaua mekongensis A.Camus

Genus of grasses

Neohouzeaua is a genus of Asian bamboo, which lie within the grass family.

These species have culms growing in large tufts, often somewhat scandent.

Neohouzeaua is sometimes included in the genus Schizostachyum.

Species

1. Neohouzeaua fimbriata - Myanmar, Thailand
2. Neohouzeaua kerriana - Thailand
3. Neohouzeaua mekongensis - Laos, Cambodia, Vietnam
4. Neohouzeaua stricta - straight-culmed Burma bamboo - Myanmar
5. Neohouzeaua tavoyana - straight-culmed Burma bamboo - Myanmar

Formerly included

see Dinochloa and Schizostachyum

- Neohouzeaua coradata - Schizostachyum coradatum
- Neohouzeaua dulloa - Schizostachyum dullooa
- Neohouzeaua helferi - Schizostachyum helferi
- Neohouzeaua puberula - Dinochloa puberula
