= Schizostachyum helferi =

Scientific classification
- Kingdom: Plantae
- Clade: Tracheophytes
- Clade: Angiosperms
- Clade: Monocots
- Clade: Commelinids
- Order: Poales
- Family: Poaceae
- Genus: Schizostachyum
- Species: S. helferi

Binomial name
- Schizostachyum helferi (Munro) Gamble

Species of bamboo

Schizostachyum helferi (syn. Bambusa helferi, Neohouzeaua helferi, Teinostachyum helferi), is a bamboo (subfamily Bambusoideae) native to Bangladesh, northeastern India, and Myanmar. It is primarily notable for its very long internodes, up to 132 cm (52 in) in length.
