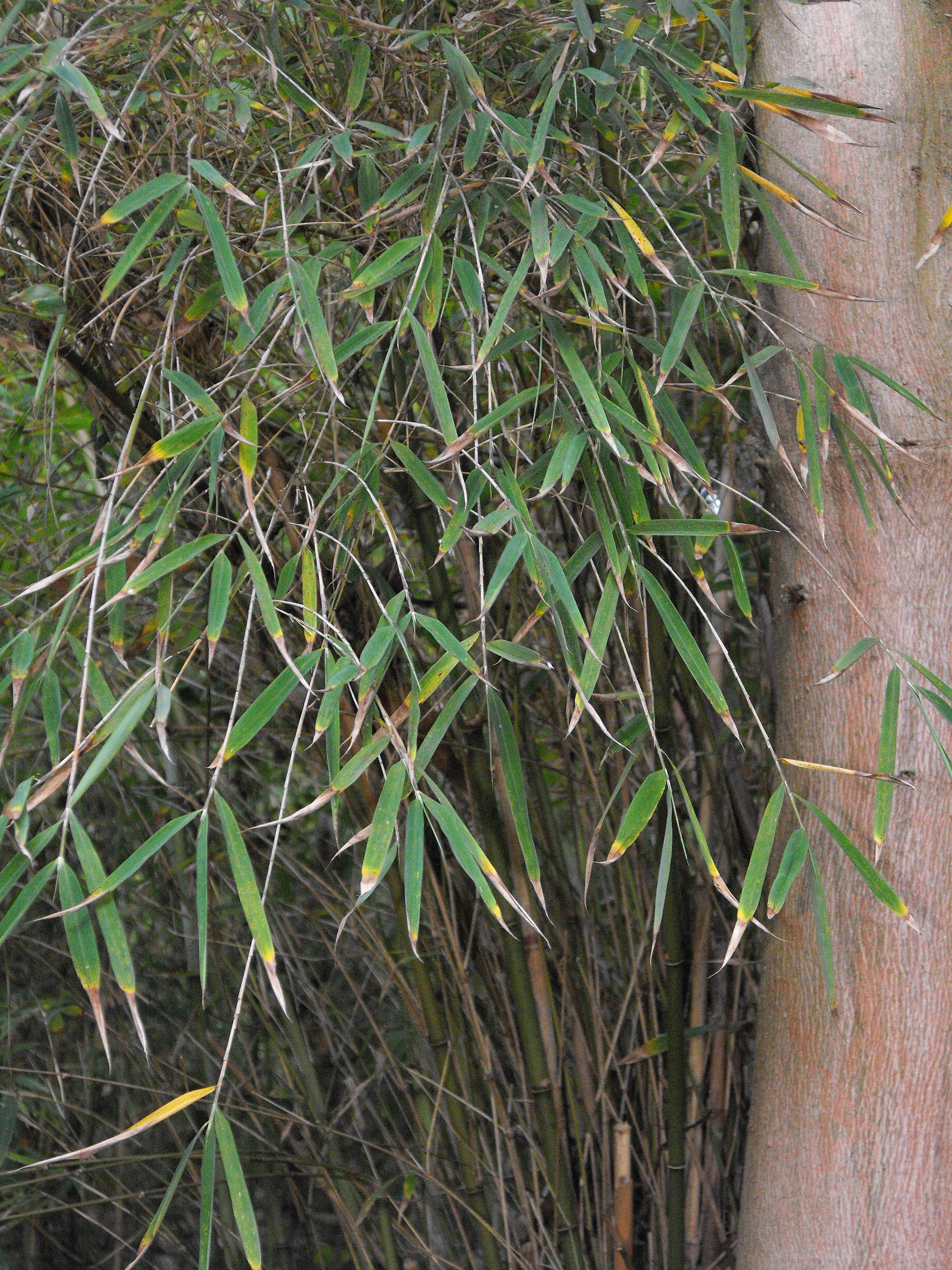
- Cephalostachyum pergracile at the San Diego Zoo, California, USA

Scientific classification
- Kingdom: Plantae
- Clade: Tracheophytes
- Clade: Angiosperms
- Clade: Monocots
- Clade: Commelinids
- Order: Poales
- Family: Poaceae
- Clade: BOP clade
- Subfamily: Bambusoideae
- Tribe: Bambuseae
- Subtribe: Melocanninae; Benth.

= Melocanninae =

Subtribe of grasses

The Melocanninae is a subtribe of bamboo (tribe Bambuseae of the family Poaceae).

== Genera ==
Nine genera were accepted by Soreng et al.:

- Annamocalamus
- Cephalostachyum
- Davidsea
- Melocanna
- Neohouzeaua
- Ochlandra
- Pseudostachyum
- Schizostachyum
- Stapletonia
