= Hermershausen =

- Borough of Marburg
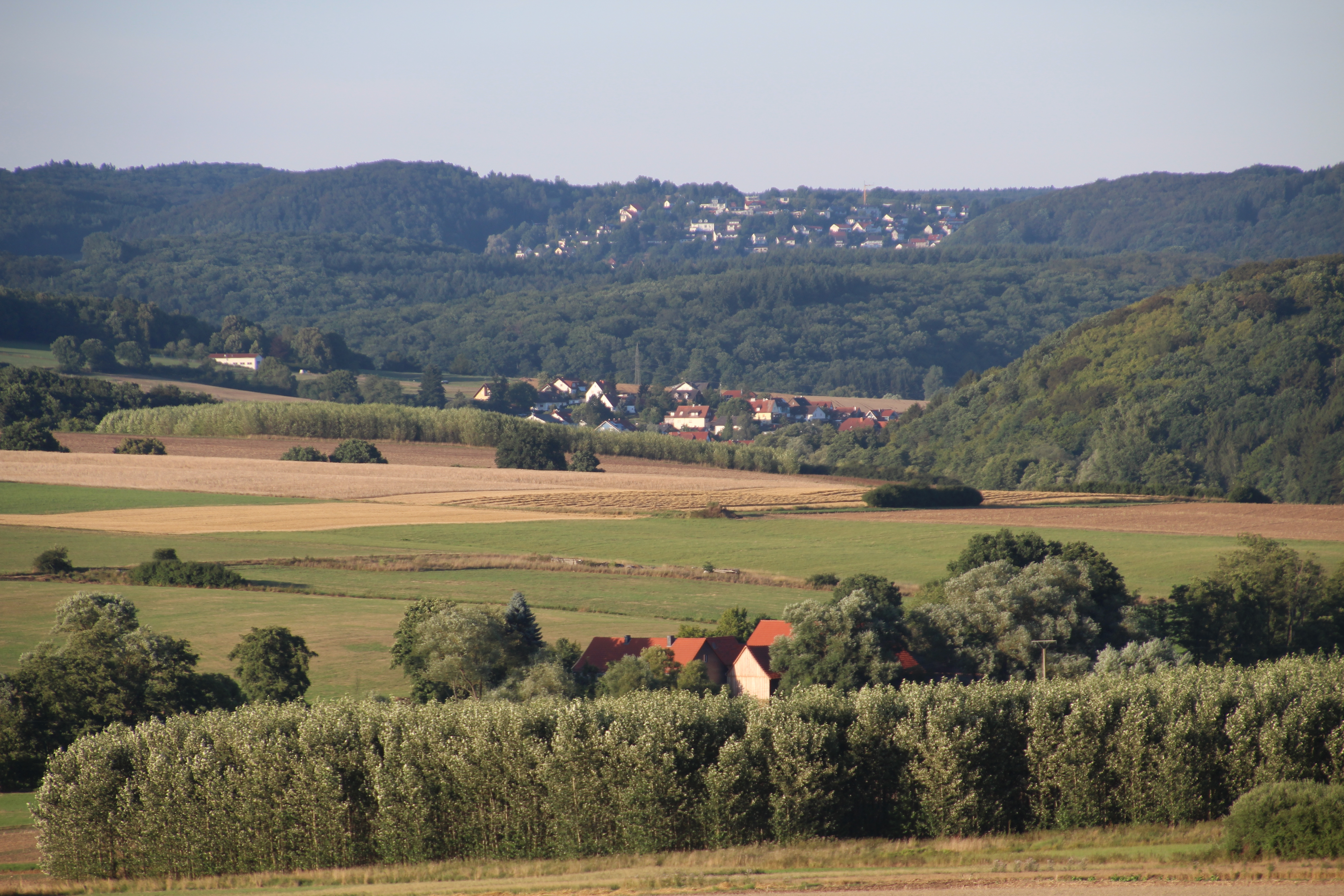

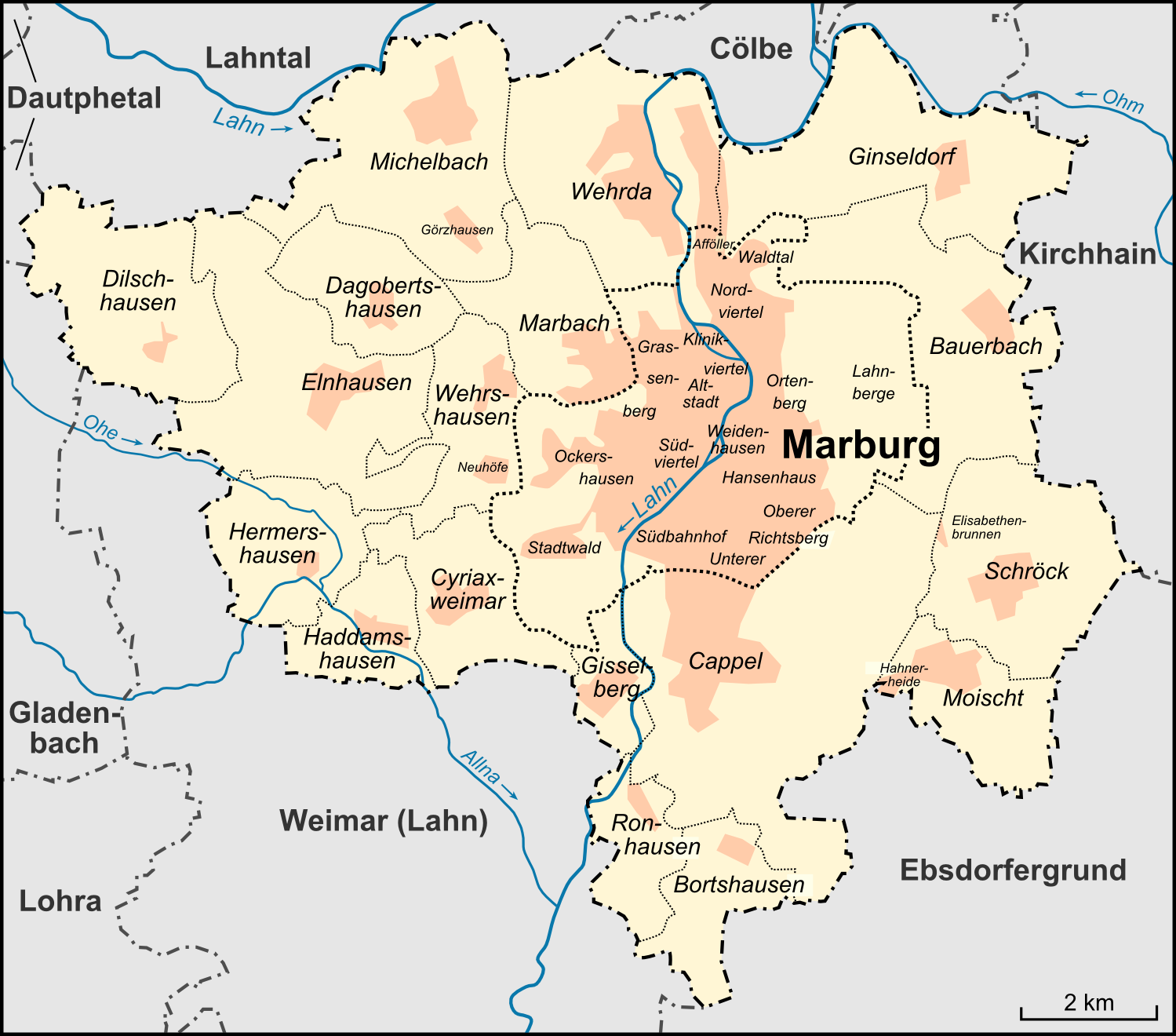
- Stadtteile of Marburg
- Interactive map of Hermershausen
- Location within Germany Location within Hesse
- Coordinates: 50°47′17″N 8°41′15″E
- Country: Germany
- State: Hesse
- District: Marburg-Biedenkopf
- City: Marburg

Area
  - Total: 4.18 km^{2} (1.61 sq mi)
- Elevation: 198–223 m (650–732 ft)

Population (2019-12-31)
  - Total: 387
  - Density: 92.6/km^{2} (240/sq mi)
- Time zone: UTC+01:00 (CET)
  - Summer (DST): UTC+02:00 (CEST)
- Postal codes: 35041
- Dialling codes: 06421

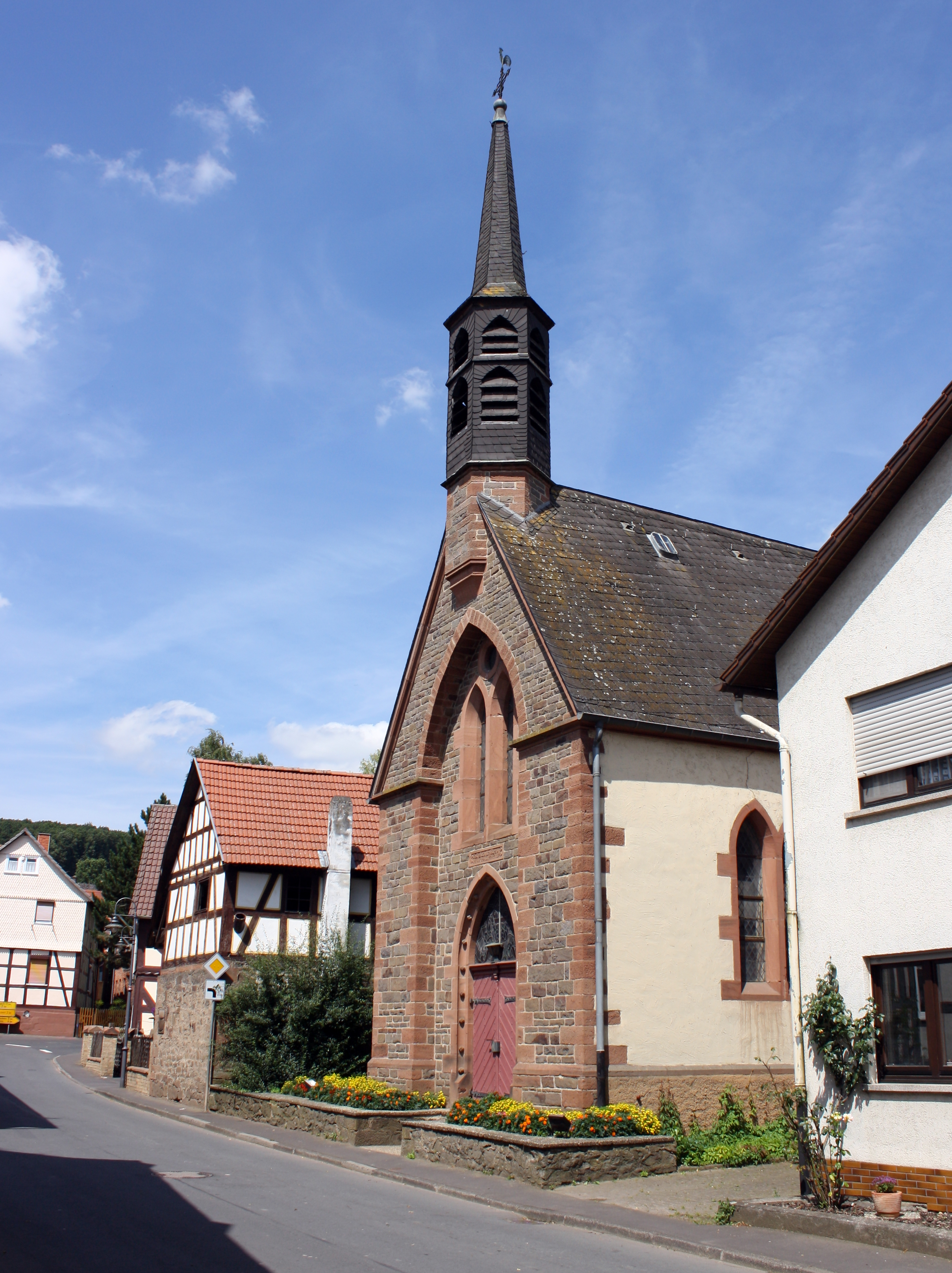
Hermershausen church

Hermershausen is a borough (Ortsbezirk) of Marburg in Hesse.
