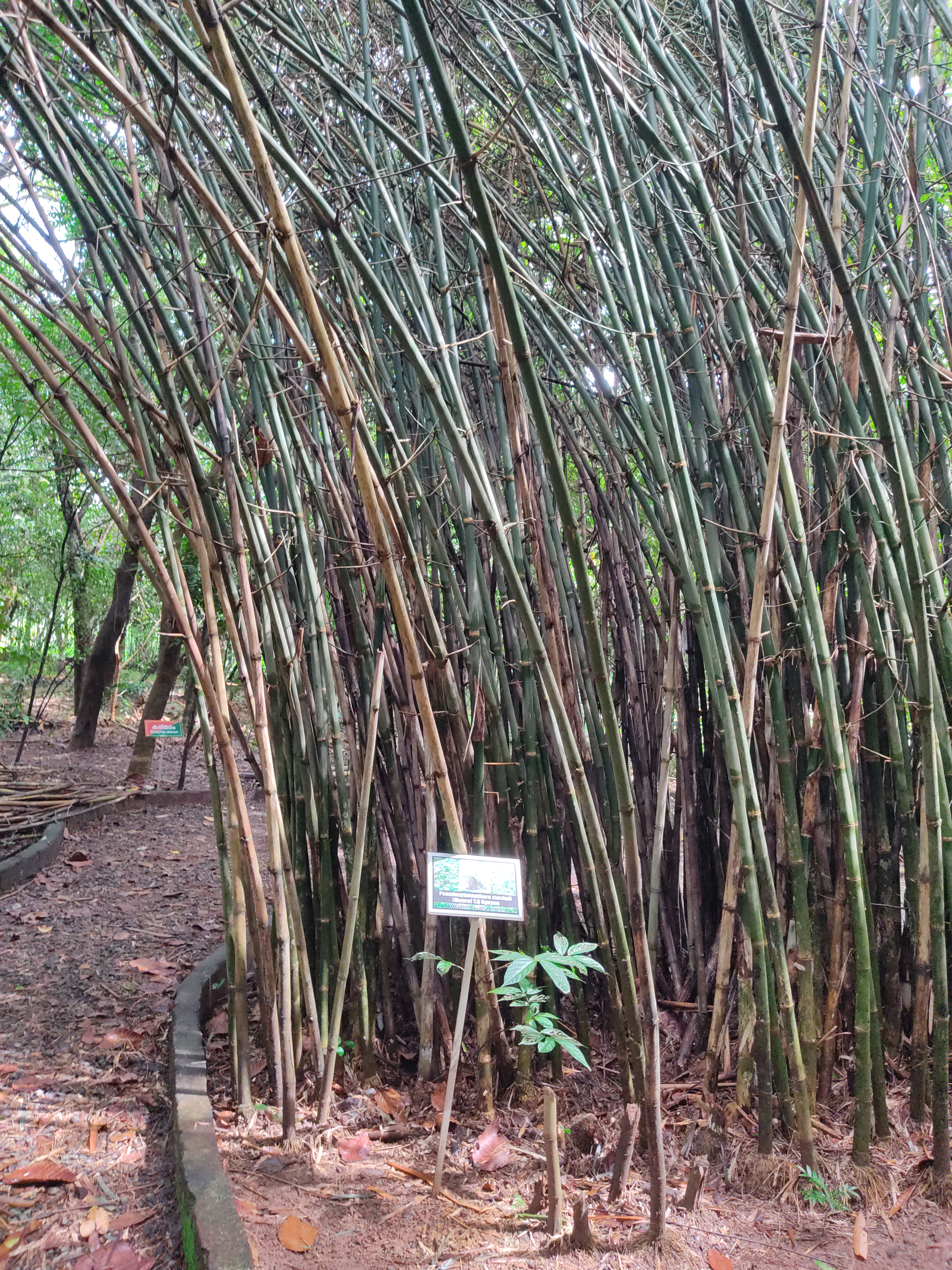
- Pseudoxytenanthera stocksii

Scientific classification
- Kingdom: Plantae
- Clade: Tracheophytes
- Clade: Angiosperms
- Clade: Monocots
- Clade: Commelinids
- Order: Poales
- Family: Poaceae
- Subfamily: Bambusoideae
- Tribe: Bambuseae
- Subtribe: Bambusinae
- Genus: Pseudoxytenanthera; Soderstr. & R.P.Ellis

Type species
- Pseudoxytenanthera monadelpha (Thwaites) Soderstr. & R.P.Ellis

Synonyms
- Pseudotenanthera R.B.Majumdar in S.Karthikeyan & al.; Munrochloa M.Kumar & Remesh

= Pseudoxytenanthera =

Genus of grasses

Pseudoxytenanthera is a genus of Asian bamboo in the grass family native to India, Sri Lanka, and Indochina.

Species

1. Pseudoxytenanthera bourdillonii (Gamble) H.B.Naithani – India
2. Pseudoxytenanthera monadelpha (Thwaites) Soderstr. & R.P.Ellis – India, Sri Lanka, Laos, Myanmar, Vietnam
3. Pseudoxytenanthera ritcheyi (Munro) H.B.Naithani – India
4. Pseudoxytenanthera stocksii (Munro) T.Q.Nguyen – India, Vietnam

Formerly included

see Dendrocalamus Gigantochloa

- Pseudoxytenanthera albociliata – Gigantochloa albociliata
- Pseudoxytenanthera densa – Gigantochloa densa
- Pseudoxytenanthera dinhensis – Gigantochloa dinhensis
- Pseudoxytenanthera hayatae – Gigantochloa hayatae
- Pseudoxytenanthera hosseusii – Gigantochloa hosseusii
- Pseudoxytenanthera nigrociliata – Gigantochloa nigrociliata
- Pseudoxytenanthera parvifolia – Gigantochloa parvifolia
- Pseudoxytenanthera poilanei – Gigantochloa poilanei
- Pseudoxytenanthera sinuata – Dendrocalamus sinuatus
- Pseudoxytenanthera tenuispiculata – Gigantochloa tenuispiculata
