= William Munro (British Army officer) =

British botanist (1818–1880)

General William Munro CB FLS
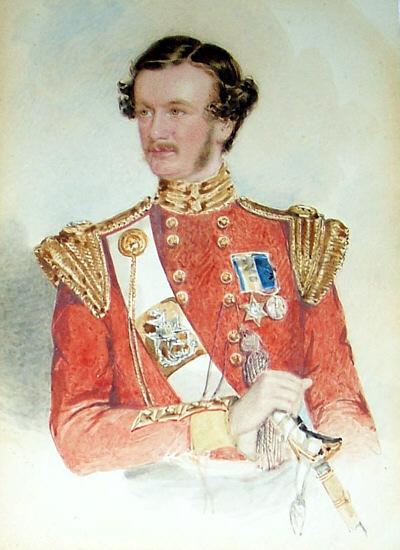
- Born: 1818; Druid Stoke, Gloucestershire
- Died: 29 January 1880 (aged 61–62); Taunton, Somerset
- Occupations: Army officer, botanist

General William Munro CB FLS (1818–1880) was a senior English Army officer and plant collector, botanist and agrostologist (specialist on grasses). His botanical works included Hortus Bangalorensis and Hortus Agrensis.

== Military career ==
Munro was born as eldest son of William Munro in Druid Stoke, Gloucestershire (now in Bristol), in 1818. In 1834 he entered the 39th (Dorsetshire) Regiment of Foot as an ensign. He was promoted and given the rank of lieutenant in April 1836, captain in July 1844, major in May 1852 and lieutenant colonel in November 1853. He served many years with his regiment in India. However, it was during the Battle of Maharajpore where he was severely wounded on 24 December 1843.

In 1876 he was given the colonelcy of the 93rd (Sutherland Highlanders) Regiment of Foot for life and on 25 June 1878 promoted to the rank of general.

== Plant collecting and agrostology ==
Munro became a fellow of the Linnean Society of London in 1840. He conducted collecting expeditions to India (1834–1838), Kashmir (1847), and Barbados (1870–1875). His main research field was tropical grasses, including the bamboo species of which he published a monograph in 1868. The genera Munroa, Munronia and Munrochloa are named in his honour.

== Death ==
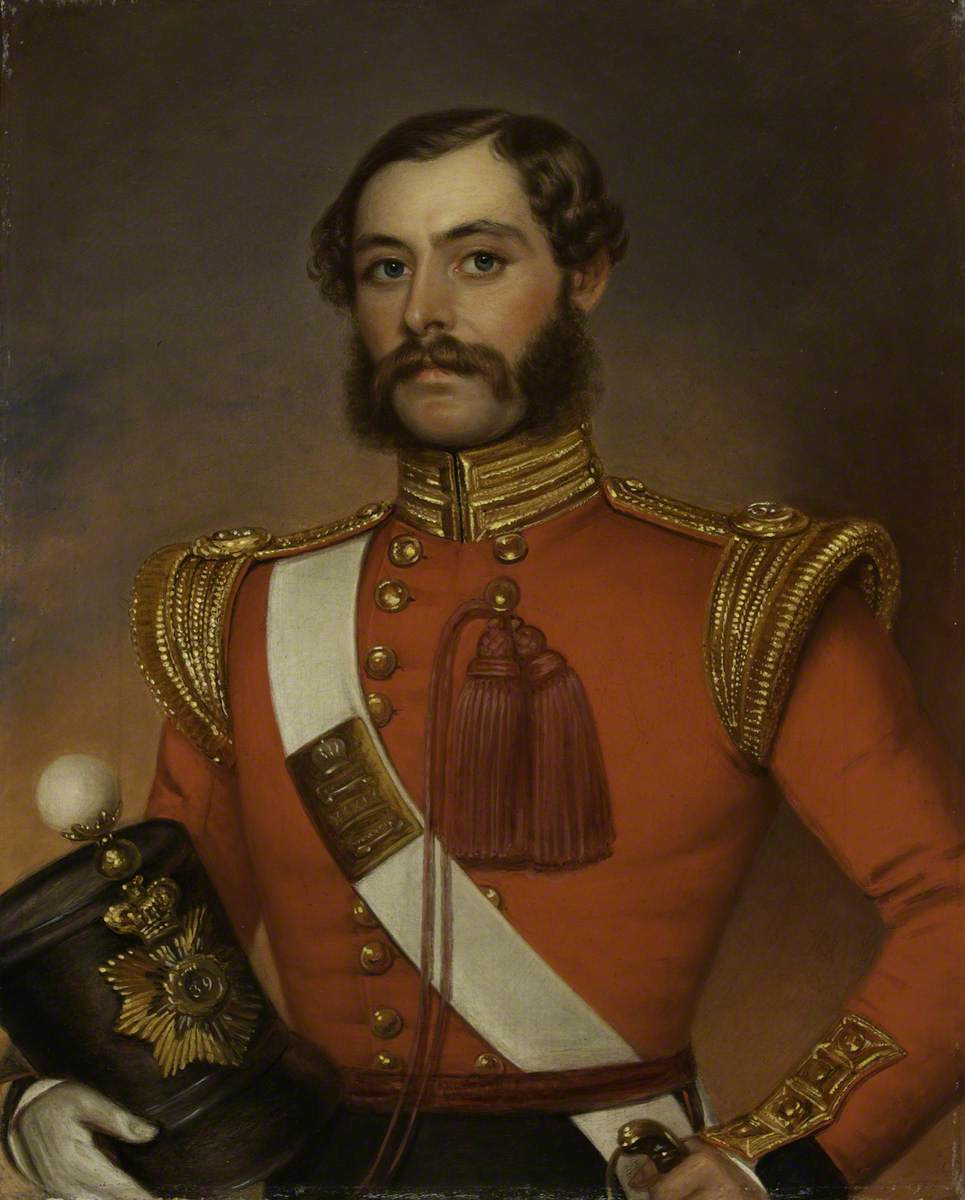
Lieutenant and Adjutant (later General) William Munro, 39th (Dorsetshire) Regiment of Foot, painted by Jivan Rama, in Agra 1844

Munro died in Taunton, Somerset, on 29 January 1880.

This botanist is denoted by the author abbreviation Munro when citing a botanical name.

== Selected works ==
- Discovery of Fossil Plants at Kamptee, 'Proc. Agr. Soc. India,' 1842, pp. 22–23
- On Antidotes to Snake-bites, 'J. Agr. Soc. India,' 1848, vi. 1-23
- Report on Timber Trees of Bengal, 'Edinburgh New Phil. J.,' 1849, xlvi. 84–94
- Froriep Notizen, 1849, x. 81–7, 'Characters of some New Grasses collected at Hong Kong & in the vicinity by Mr. Charles Wright in the North Pacific Exploring Expedition,' 'American Academy Proceedings,' 1857–60, vi. 362–8
- An Identification of the Grasses of Linnæus's Herbarium, now in possession of the Linnean Society of London, 'Linn. Soc. J.,' 1862. vi. 33–55
- A monograph of the Bambusaceae. In: Trans. Linn. Soc. London. 26, 1868.
- Hortus Bangalorensis, 1837, held at Royal Botanic Gardens, Kew.

Military offices
Preceded by Freeman Murray	Colonel of the 93rd (Sutherland Highlanders) Regiment of Foot; 1876–1880	Succeeded by Mark kerr Atherley
