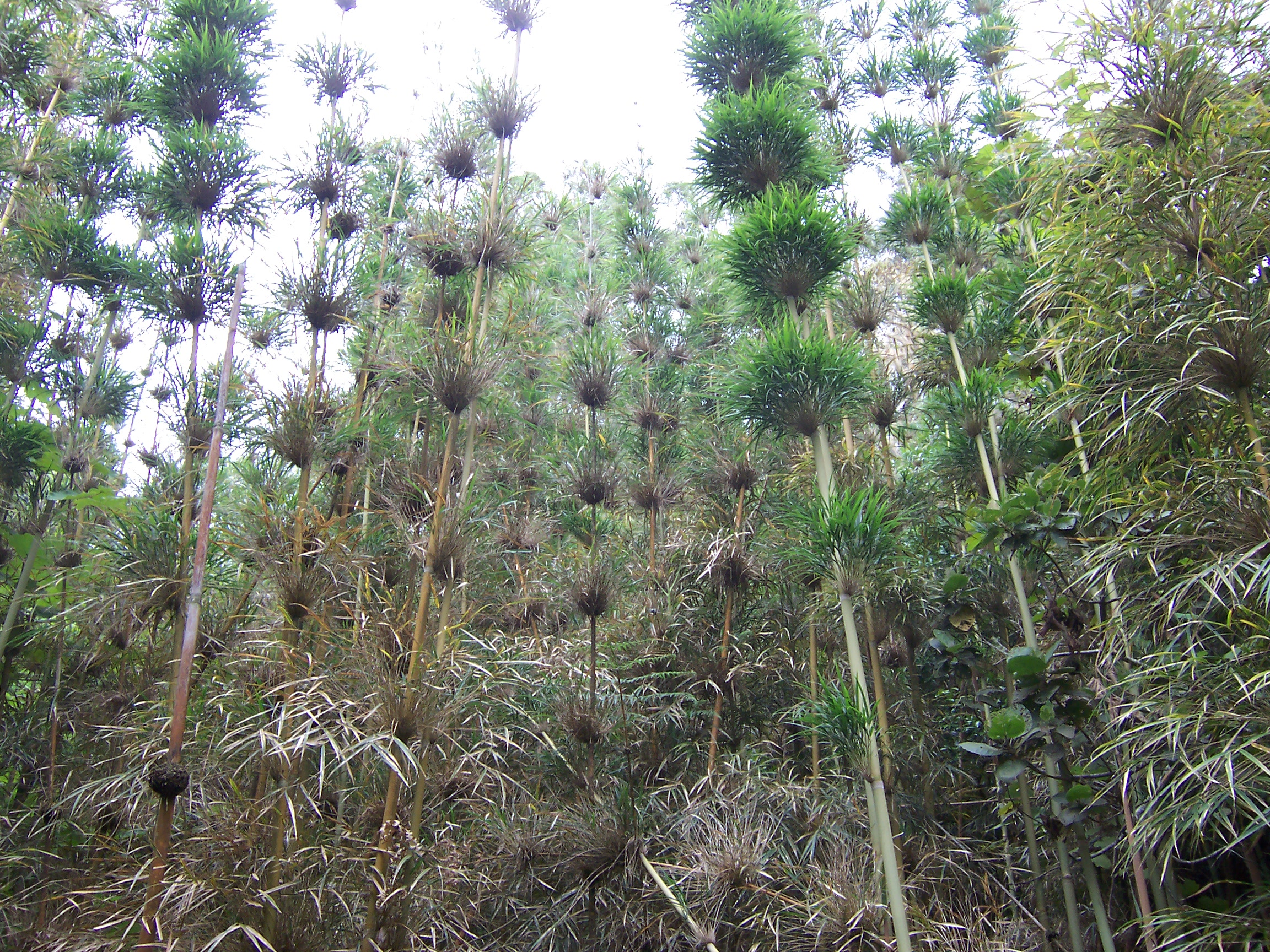
- Nastus borbonicus

Scientific classification
- Kingdom: Plantae
- Clade: Tracheophytes
- Clade: Angiosperms
- Clade: Monocots
- Clade: Commelinids
- Order: Poales
- Family: Poaceae
- Subfamily: Bambusoideae
- Tribe: Bambuseae
- Subtribe: Hickeliinae
- Genus: Nastus; Juss.

Type species
- Nastus borbonicus J.F.Gmel.

Synonyms
- Oreiostachys Gamble; Stemmatospermum P.Beauv.

= Nastus =

Genus of grasses

Nastus is a genus of slender, erect, scrambling or climbing bamboos in the grass family Poaceae. It includes 12 species native to Madagascar and Réunion.

The genus was erected by French botanist Antoine Laurent de Jussieu in 1789.

== Species ==
12 species are accepted.

- Nastus ambrensis A. Camus – Madagascar
- Nastus aristatus A. Camus – Madagascar
- Nastus borbonicus J.F. Gmel. – Réunion
- Nastus decaryanus A. Camus – Madagascar
- Nastus elongatus A. Camus – Madagascar
- Nastus emirnensis (Baker) A. Camus – Madagascar
- Nastus humbertianus A. Camus – Madagascar
- Nastus lokohoensis A. Camus – Madagascar
- Nastus madagascariensis A.Camus – Madagascar
- Nastus manongarivensis A.Camus – Madagascar
- Nastus perrieri A. Camus – Madagascar
- Nastus tsaratananensis A. Camus – Madagascar

=== Formerly included ===
See Arundinaria, Bambusa, Cathariostachys, Cenchrus, Chloothamnus, Chusquea, Dendrocalamus, Dinochloa, Gigantochloa, Guadua, Melocanna, Ruhooglandia, Thamnocalamus, and Widjajachloa.

- N. arundinaceus – Bambusa bambos
- N. baccifera – Melocanna baccifera
- N. barbatus – Guadua tagoara
- N. brunneus – Chusquea baculifera
- N. capitatus – Cathariostachys capitata
- N. carolinianus – Cenchrus spinifex
- N. chusque – Chusquea scandens
- N. elatoides – Chloothamus elatoides
- N. elatus – Chloothamnus elatus
- N. elegantissimus – Chloothamnus elegantissimus
- N. glaucus – Chloothamnus glaucus
- N. guadua – Guadua angustifolia
- N. holttumianus – Chloothamnus holttumianus
- N. hooglandii – Ruhooglandia hooglandii
- N. latifolius – Guadua latifolia
- N. longispicula – Chloothamnus longispiculus
- N. macrospermus – Arundinaria gigantea
- N. obtusus – Chloothamnus obtusus
- N. productus – Widjajachloa producta
- N. prolifer – Chusquea quila
- N reholttumianus – Chloothamnus reholttumianus
- N. rudimentifer – Chloothamnus rudimentifer
- N. schlechteri – Chloothamnus schlechteri
- N. schmutzii – Chloothamnus schmutzii
- N. quila – Chusquea quila
- N. strictus – Dendrocalamus strictus
- N. tessellatus – Thamnocalamus tessellatus
- N. thouarsii – Bambusa vulgaris
- N. tjankorreh – Dinochloa scandens
- N. verticillatus – Gigantochloa verticillata
- N. viviparus – Bambusa vulgaris
