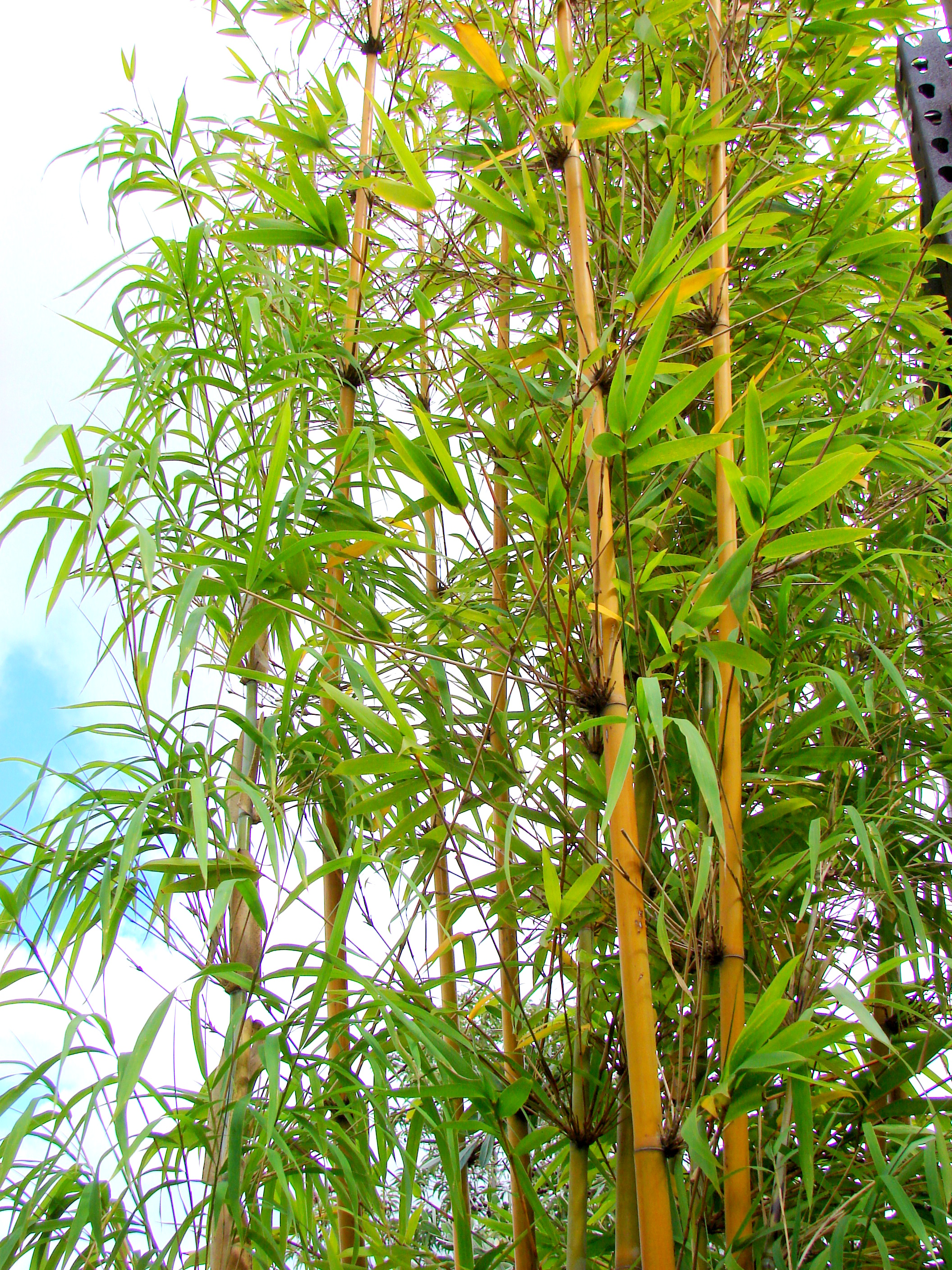
- Bambusa textilis

Scientific classification
- Kingdom: Plantae
- Clade: Tracheophytes
- Clade: Angiosperms
- Clade: Monocots
- Clade: Commelinids
- Order: Poales
- Family: Poaceae
- Subfamily: Bambusoideae
- Tribe: Bambuseae; Kunth ex Dumort. (1829)

Genera
- 68, see text

Synonyms
- Arthrostylidieae E. Camus (1913); Baccifereae E. Camus (1913, nom. inval.); Chusqueae E. Camus (1913); Hickelieae A. Camus (1935, nom. inval.); Oxytenanthereae Tzvelev (1987)

= Bambuseae =

Tribe of grasses

The Bambuseae are the most diverse tribe of bamboos in the grass family (Poaceae). They consist of woody species from tropical regions, including some giant bamboos. Their sister group are the small herbaceous bamboos from the tropics in tribe Olyreae, while the temperate woody bamboos (Arundinarieae) are more distantly related. The Bambuseae fall into two clades, corresponding to species from the Neotropics (subtribes Arthrostylidiinae, Chusqueinae, and Guaduinae) and from the Paleotropics (subtribes Bambusinae, Hickeliinae, Melocanninae, and Racemobambosinae).

== Subtribes and genera ==
The 73 genera are placed in eleven subtribes:

- subtribe Arthrostylidiinae:
  Actinocladum, Alvimia, Arthrostylidium, Athroostachys, Atractantha, Aulonemia, Cambajuva, Colanthelia, Didymogonyx, Elytrostachys, Filgueirasia, Glaziophyton, Merostachys, Myriocladus, Quixiume, Rhipidocladum, Stelanemia, Tibisia, Vianaea
- subtribe Bambusinae:
  Bambusa, Bonia, Cochinchinochloa, Dendrocalamus, Fimbribambusa, Gigantochloa, Maclurochloa, Melocalamus, Neomicrocalamus, Oreobambos, Oxytenanthera, Phuphanochloa, Pseudobambusa, Pseudoxytenanthera, Soejatmia, Thyrsostachys, Vietnamosasa, Yersinochloa
- subtribe Chusqueinae:
  Chusquea
- subtribe Dinochloinae:
  Cyrtochloa, Dinochloa, Mullerochloa, Neololeba, Pinga, Parabambusa, Sphaerobambos
- subtribe Greslaniinae:
  Greslania
- subtribe Guaduinae:
  Apoclada, Eremocaulon, Guadua, Olmeca, Otatea
- subtribe Hickeliinae:
  Cathariostachys, Decaryochloa, Hickelia, Hitchcockella, Nastus, Perrierbambus, Sirochloa, Sokinochloa, Valiha
- subtribe Holttumochloinae:
  Holttumochloa, Kinabaluchloa, Nianhochloa
- subtribe Melocanninae:
  Annamocalamus, Cephalostachyum, Davidsea, Melocanna, Neohouzeaua, Ochlandra, Pseudostachyum, Schizostachyum, Stapletonia
- subtribe Racemobambosinae:
  Chloothamnus, Racemobambos, Widjajachloa
- subtribe Temburongiinae:
  Temburongia
- incertae sedis
  Ruhooglandia, Temochloa
