= Londoño =

Londoño is a Spanish surname of Basque origin, after a town by the same name in Álava. Notable people with the surname include:

- Antonio Londoño (born 1954), Colombian professional racing cyclist
- Azarias Londoño (born 2001), Panamanian footballer
- Beatriz Londoño (born 1959), Colombian physician and administrative politician
- Carmenza Cardona Londoño (1953-1981), Colombian guerrilla fighter
- Carolina Correa Londoño (1905-1986), First Lady of Colombia
- Catalina Londoño (born 1980), Colombian actress
- Daniel Londoño (footballer) (born 1995), Colombian footballer
- Daniel Londoño (economist), Colombian economist and academic
- Fernando Londoño (born 1944), Colombian politician, lawyer, and economist
- Fernando Londoño y Londoño (1910-1994), Colombian lawyer and diplomat
- Flabián Londoño (born 2000), Colombian footballer
- Germán Londoño (born 1961), Colombian painter, draftsman and sculptor
- Jorge Eduardo Londoño (born 1960), Colombian politician
- José Santacruz Londoño (1943-1996), Colombian drug lord
- José Roberto López Londoño (1937-2018), Colombian Roman Catholic bishop
- Juan Luis Londoño Arias (born 1994), better known as Maluma, Colombian rapper, singer, songwriter and actor
- Juana Carolina Londoño (born 1977), Colombian politician
- Juliana Londoño (born 2005), Colombian cyclist
- Julio Londoño Londoño (1901-1980), Colombian historian and soldier
- Julio Londoño Paredes (born 1938), Colombian Army Lieutenant Colonel and diplomat
- Kevin Londoño (born 1993), Colombian footballer
- Laura Londoño (born 1988), Colombian actress and model
- María Teresa Londoño (1882-1962), Colombian housewife, socialite and the First Lady of Colombia
- Oscar Londono (born 1971), Colombian manager and former player
- Óscar Londoño (born 1979), Colombian footballer
- Ricardo Londoño (1949-2009), Colombian racing driver
- Santiago Londoño (born 2008), Colombian footballer
- Ximena Londoño (born 1958), Colombian botanist
