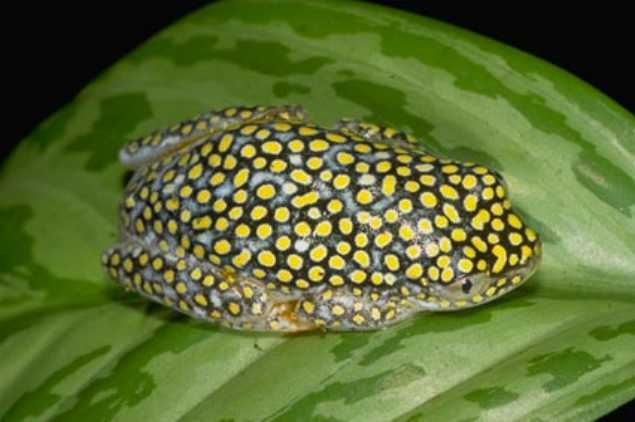

Conservation status
- Least Concern (IUCN 3.1)

Scientific classification
- Kingdom: Animalia
- Phylum: Chordata
- Class: Amphibia
- Order: Anura
- Family: Hyperoliidae
- Genus: Heterixalus
- Species: H. alboguttatus

Binomial name
- Heterixalus alboguttatus (Boulenger, 1882)

Synonyms
- Heterixalus madagascariensis subspecies alboguttatus Laurent, 1950; Megalixalus madagascariensis variety alboguttata Boulenger, 1882

= Heterixalus alboguttatus =

Species of amphibian

Heterixalus alboguttatus (also known as the Starry Night Reed Frog) is a species of reed frog in the family Hyperoliidae endemic to Madagascar. Females possess a characteristic yellow-spotted dorsal patterning, while males can be almost uniformly white. It forms a species complex with H. boettgeri and H. madagascariensis, and is known to hybridize with H. boettgeri.

H. alboguttatus is generally found in open habitats, such as savannahs, degraded forest, swamps, grasslands and ricefields. Since these habitats are generally expanding in Madagascar due to human activity, it is not considered threatened.

Females of the species reach a snout-vent length of about 30-33mm, and the H. alboguttatus species breeds in a range of temporary and permanent water bodies, such as those found in the rice fields where the species may makes its habitat, with females producing around 500 black and white eggs, often perching on sunlit leaves of Pandanus plants and other plants during the breeding period.
