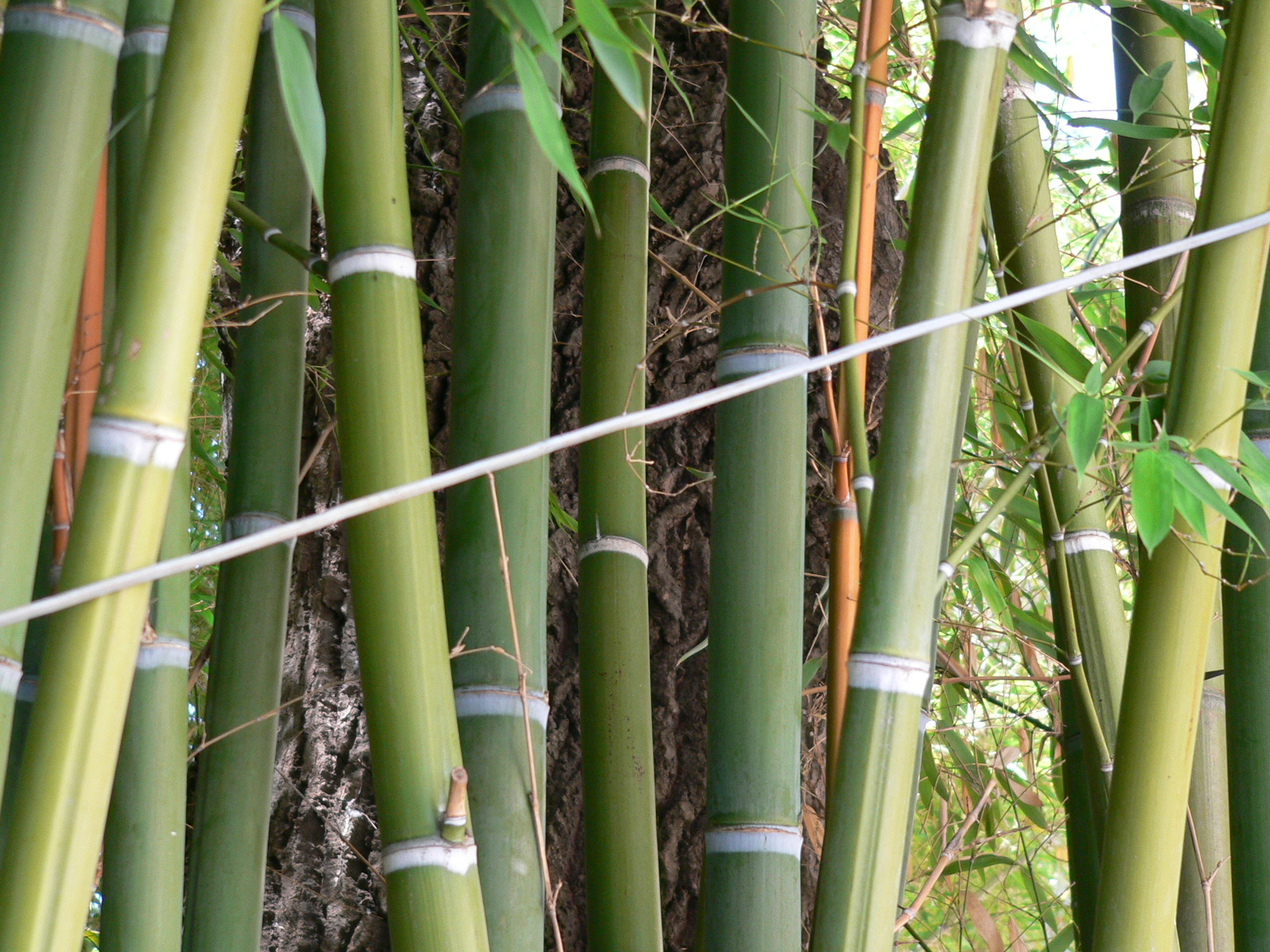

Scientific classification
- Kingdom: Plantae
- Clade: Tracheophytes
- Clade: Angiosperms
- Clade: Monocots
- Clade: Commelinids
- Order: Poales
- Family: Poaceae
- Clade: BOP clade
- Subfamily: Bambusoideae
- Tribe: Bambuseae
- Subtribe: Bambusinae; J.Presl

Genera
- See text

= Bambusinae =

Subtribe of grasses

The Bambusinae are a subtribe of bamboo (tribe Bambuseae of the family Poaceae). It comprises 17 genera.

== Genera ==
- Bambusa
- Bonia
- Cochinchinochloa
- Dendrocalamus
- Fimbribambusa
- Gigantochloa
- Laobambos
- Maclurochloa
- Melocalamus
- Neomicrocalamus
- Oreobambos
- Oxytenanthera
- Phuphanochloa
- Pseudobambusa T.Q.Nguyen
- Pseudoxytenanthera
- Soejatmia
- Thyrsostachys
- Vietnamosasa
- Yersinochloa
