= H. madagascariensis =

H. madagascariensis may refer to:

- Harungana madagascariensis, the haronga, a flowering plant species found in tropical Africa (including Madagascar) and Mauritius
- Heterixalus madagascariensis, a frog species endemic to Madagascar
- Hickelia madagascariensis, a bamboo species found in Madagascar
- Hippopotamus madagascariensis, the Malagasy hippopotamus or Malagasy dwarf or pygmy hippopotamus, an extinct mammal species that lived on the island of Madagascar
- Hypsipetes madagascariensis, the Madagascar bulbul, a songbird species found on the Comoros, Madagascar, Mayotte and the Seychelles
