= Ximena Londoño =

Colombian botanist (born 1958)

Ximena Londoño de la Pava (born 1958 in Cali, Colombia) is a Colombian botanist, specializing in agrostology. She has done extensive research on the bamboo genus Guadua in South America and Central America.

== Biography ==
In 1979 she began plant collecting. In 1983 she graduated in agricultural engineering from the National University of Colombia at Palmira. After graduation, she studied bamboo taxonomy under Thomas Robert Soderstrom at the Smithsonian Institution. Her bamboo research has received funding from the Smithsonian Institution, Colciencias, the National Geographic Society, the American Bamboo Society (founded in 1979), and the International Bamboo and Rattan Organisation.

She has over fifteen co-collectors, but the primary two are Lynn G. Clark and Thomas Soderstrom. Primarily collecting among the Bambusoideae, Ximena Londoño has also collected among the family Gesneriaceae. She has worked primarily in Latin America but also studied bamboos in Indonesia, China, and India. She has collected plant specimens in Colombia, Ecuador, Guyana, Peru, Venezuela, Brazil, Argentina, Costa Rica, Cuba, and Puerto Rico. In Colombia's Quindío Department, she owns and manages an organic farm, growing coffee, bamboo, bananas, and tropical flowers. The farm, at 1250 meters altitude, is an estate she inherited from her father, an engineer, and her mother, an artist, who were the owners and managers. Ximena Londoño grew up there and her mother, Doña Sofi, hired two teachers to teach village children in the mornings and village adults in the afternoons. (The school graduated more than 85 students and closed when Doña Sofi died at age 93.) Ximena, with her parents, eventually moved to Cali for her higher education; although the family went back to their farm on weekends. At the National University of Colombia at Palmira, she was one of only eight women in a class of one hundred twenty students. She became a scientist, a traveller, and an adventurer, but always retained her love for her farm and the people in the nearby village. She told an interviewer that at the farm, “todo se resuelve con una guadua: si había que apuntalar un techo, coger una fruta, fabricar un banco, arreglar uno mesa” (everything is solved with a guadua: if you had to prop up a roof, pick a fruit, make a bench, fix a table). The farm, with over 70 different bamboo species, is now a center for research and education, as well as a ecotourism destination.

Ximena Londoño ... is currently an associate researcher at the National University of Colombia and the Research Institute of Valle del Cauca (INCIVA). She has also served for many years as president of the Colombian Bamboo Society.

In the bamboo subfamily of the family Poaceae, Londoño has described over 50 new species spanning several different genera, including Guadua, Alvimia, Arthrostylidium, Aulonemia, Chusquea, Eremocaulon, and Rhipidocladum. In 2017 at the celebration of the 150th anniversary of the founding of the National University of Colombia, the Consejo Superior Universitario (Higher University Council) honored her in the category Investigación o Creación Artística y Cultural for her research.

== Selected publications ==
=== Articles ===
- maría ximena Londoño de la Pava, eneida Zurita Soto. 2008. "Two New Species of Guadua (Bambusoideae: Guaduinae) from Colombia and Bolivia". Journal Botanic Research Institute of Texas ISSN 1934-5259 Brit 2 (1 ): 25-34
- ----------------------------------------, l.g. Clark. 2002a. A revision of the Brazilian bamboo genus Eremocaulon (Poaceae: Bambuseae: Guaduinae). Syst. Bot. 27:703–721
- ----------------------------------------, l.g. Clark. 2002b. Three new taxa of Guadua (Poaceae: Bambusoideae) from South America. Novon 12:64–76
- Judziewicz, emmet, l.g. Clark, x. Londoño, m.j. Stern. 1999. American bamboos. Smithsonian Institution Press, Washington & London
- lynn g. Clark, ximena Londoño, mikio Kobayashi. 1997. Aulonemia bogotensis (Poaceae: Bambusoideae), a New Species from the Cordillera Oriental of Colombia. Brittonia 49 ( 4 ) : 503-507
- ximena Londoño, p. Peterson. 1992. Guadua chacoensis (Poaceae: Bambusoideae), its taxonomic identity, morphology and relationships. Novon 2:41–47
- --------------------, p. Peterson. 1991. Guadua sarcocarpa (Poaceae: Bambuseae), a new Amazonian bamboo with fleshy fruits. Syst. Bot. 16:630–638

=== Books ===
- 1996. Diversity and distribution of New World bamboos: with special emphasis on the Bambuseae. Nº 8 de INBAR working paper. Ed. International Network for Bamboo & Rattan. 25 pp. ISBN 8186247149
- 2004. Bambúes exóticos en Colombia. Ed. Sociedad Colombiana del Bambú. 74 pp.

== Honors ==
- President of the Sociedad Colombiana de Bambú

== Eponyms ==
- Aulonemia ximenae
- Chusquea londoniae
