= Daniel Londoño =

Daniel Londoño may refer to:

- Daniel Londoño (footballer) (born 1995), Colombian footballer
- Daniel Londoño (economist), Colombian economist and academic
