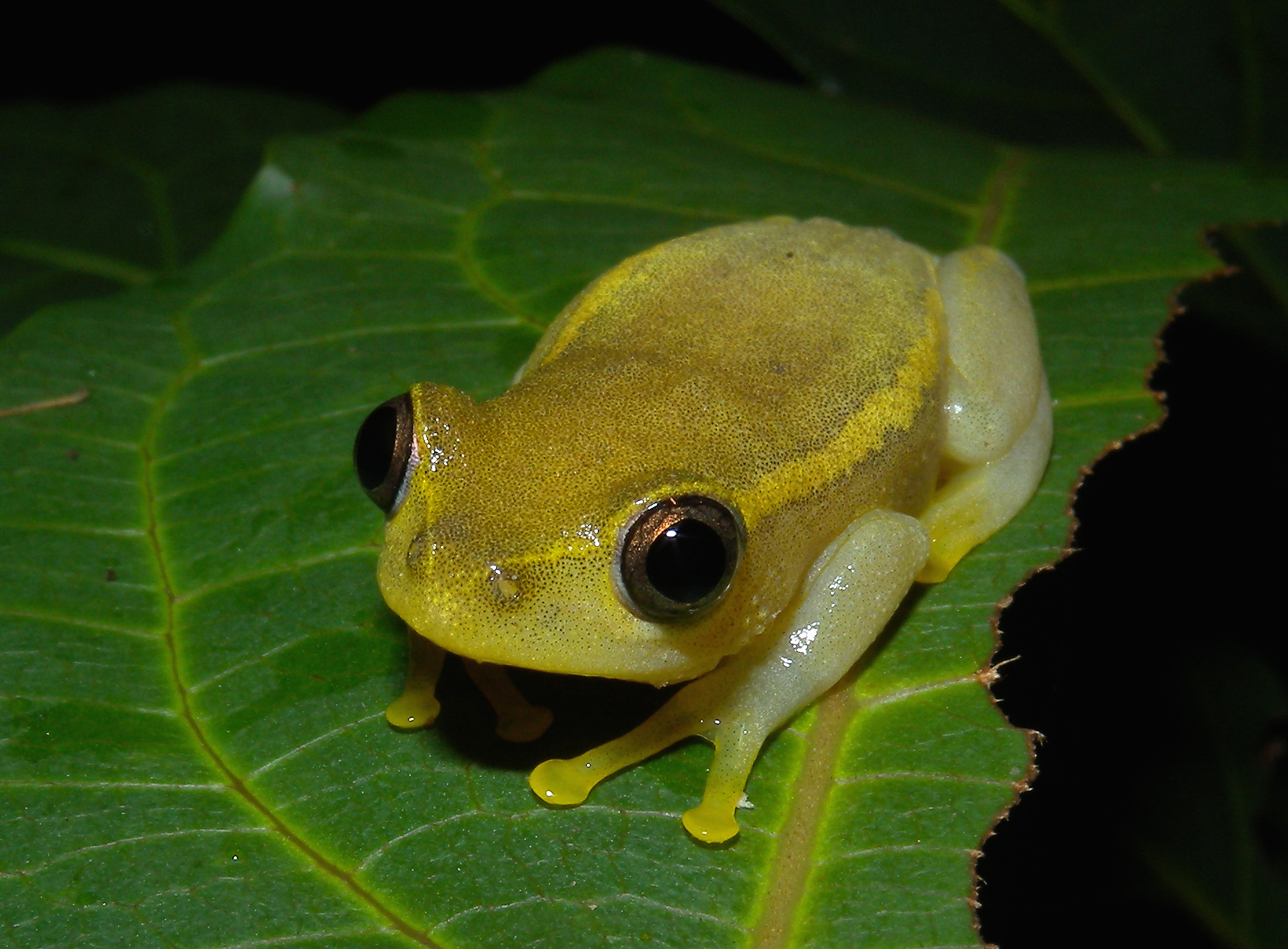

Conservation status
- Least Concern (IUCN 3.1)

Scientific classification
- Kingdom: Animalia
- Phylum: Chordata
- Class: Amphibia
- Order: Anura
- Family: Hyperoliidae
- Genus: Heterixalus
- Species: H. luteostriatus

Binomial name
- Heterixalus luteostriatus (Andersson, 1910)

Synonyms
- Heterixalus boettgeri luteostriatus Laurent, 1950; Megalixalus boettgeri var. luteostriata Andersson, 1910

= Heterixalus luteostriatus =

Species of frog

Heterixalus luteostriatus is a species of frog in the family Hyperoliidae endemic to Madagascar. Its natural habitats are subtropical or tropical dry forests, swamps, freshwater marshes, intermittent freshwater marshes, arable land, urban areas, heavily degraded former forests, ponds, irrigated land, and seasonally flooded agricultural land.
