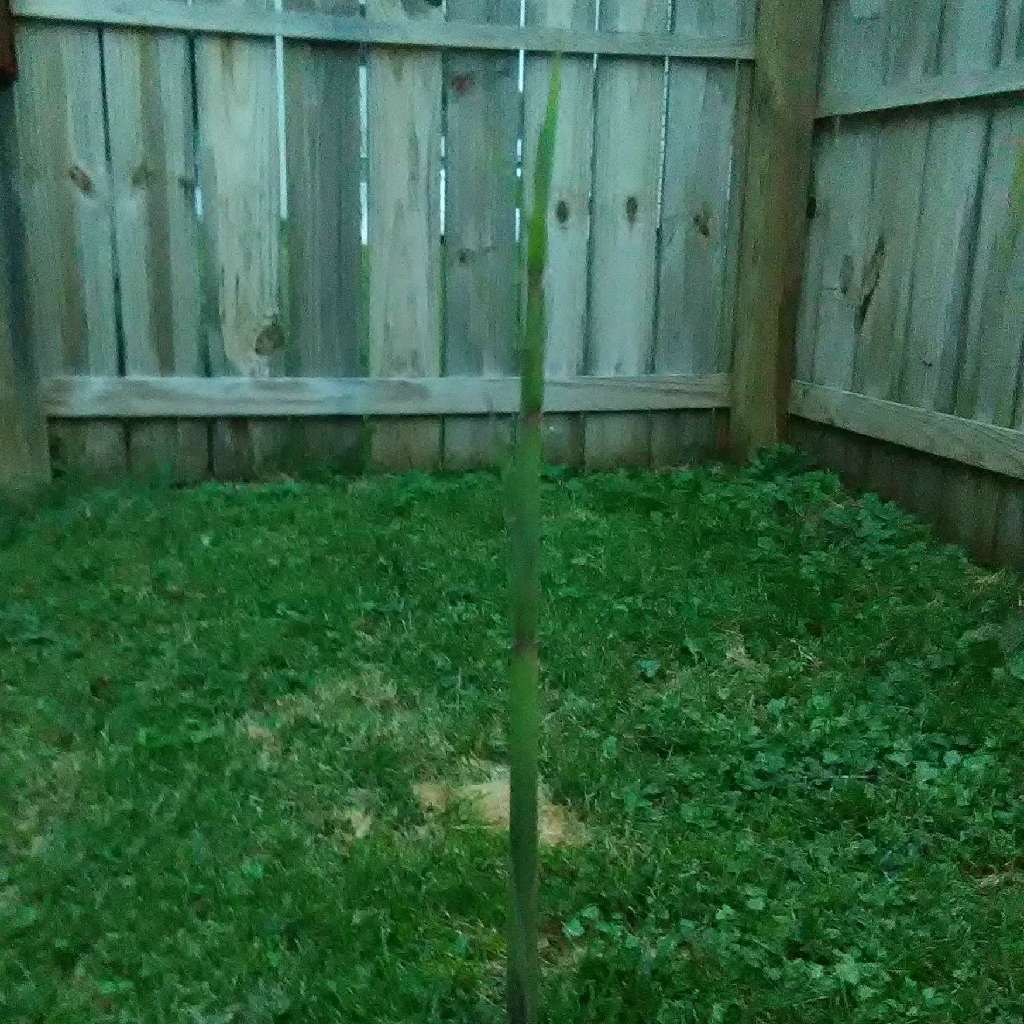

Scientific classification
- Kingdom: Plantae
- Clade: Tracheophytes
- Clade: Angiosperms
- Clade: Monocots
- Clade: Commelinids
- Order: Poales
- Family: Poaceae
- Genus: Dinochloa
- Species: D. sipitangensis

Binomial name
- Dinochloa sipitangensis S.Dransf.

= Dinochloa sipitangensis =

Species of plant

Dinochloa sipitangensis a species of tropical clumping high-climbing bamboos in the grass family.

They are found in the hill forests and lowland dipterocarp forest of Borneo, in Sabah. The species was identified by Indonesia-born British plant taxonomist, Soejatmi Dransfield, in 1981 and named after the locality, Sipitang, in which it was found.

They have zigzag culms and bare fleshy fruits.
