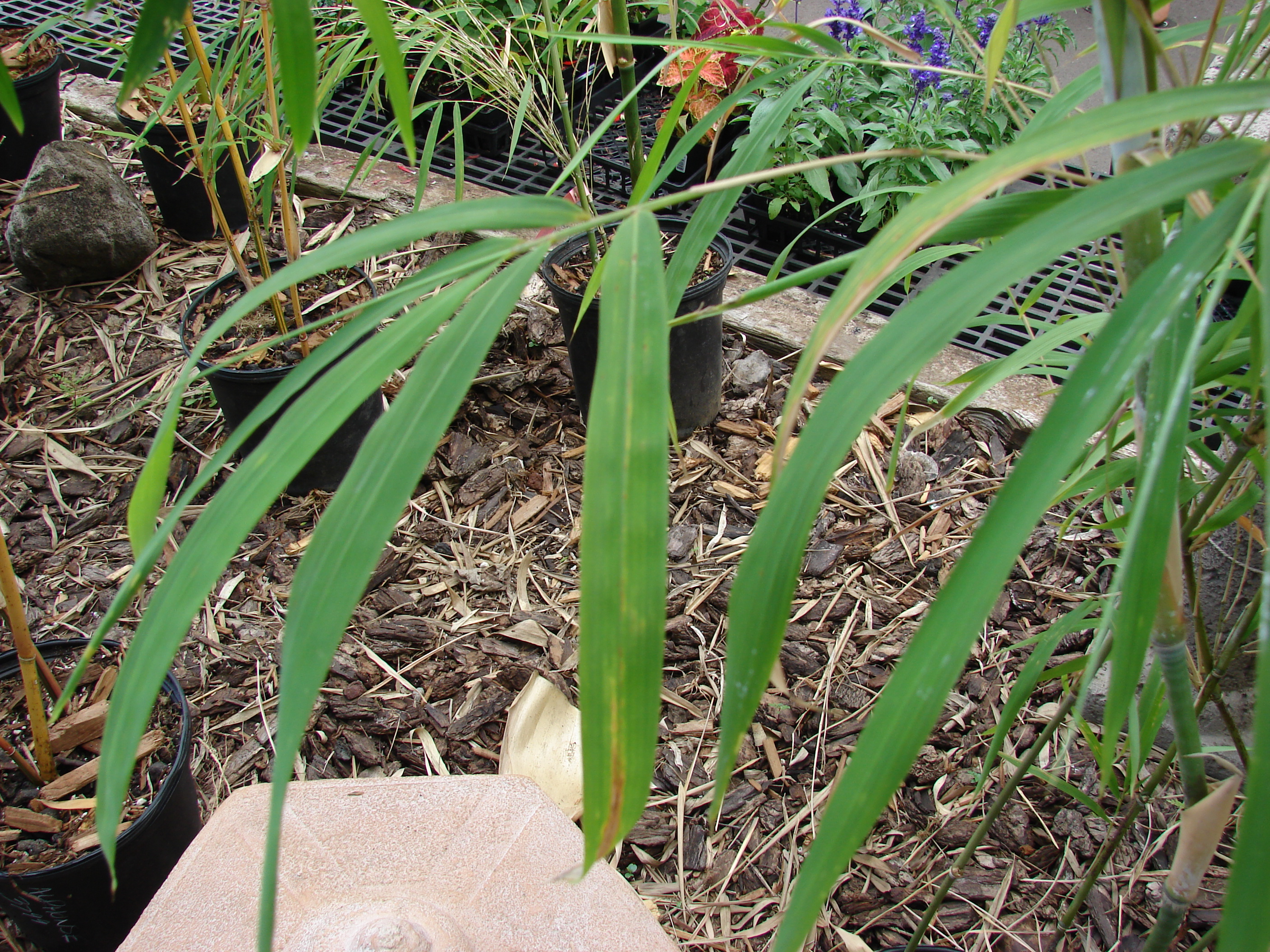
- Nastus elatus

Scientific classification
- Kingdom: Plantae
- Clade: Tracheophytes
- Clade: Angiosperms
- Clade: Monocots
- Clade: Commelinids
- Order: Poales
- Family: Poaceae
- Clade: BOP clade
- Subfamily: Bambusoideae
- Tribe: Bambuseae
- Subtribe: Hickeliinae

Genera
- Cathariostachys; Decaryochloa; Hickelia; Hitchcockella; Nastus; Perrierbambus; Sirochloa; Sokinochloa; Valiha

Synonyms
- Nastinae

= Hickeliinae =

Subtribe of grasses

The Hickeliinae are a subtribe of bamboo (tribe Bambuseae of the family Poaceae). It comprises nine genera.
