= Laobambos =

Scientific classification
- Kingdom: Plantae
- Clade: Tracheophytes
- Clade: Angiosperms
- Clade: Monocots
- Clade: Commelinids
- Order: Poales
- Family: Poaceae
- Subfamily: Bambusoideae
- Tribe: Bambuseae
- Subtribe: Bambusinae
- Genus: Laobambos; Haev., Lamxay & D.Z.Li
- Species: L. calcareus

Binomial name
- Laobambos calcareus Haev., Lamxay & D.Z.Li

Genus of bamboo

Laobambos is a genus of bamboo in the family Poaceae. It has only one species, Laobambos calcareus, native to Laos. It is unique among the bamboos in that it has succulent culms, an adaptation to seasonal drought in its karstic habitat.
