= Cyrtochloa puser =

Scientific classification
- Kingdom: Plantae
- Clade: Tracheophytes
- Clade: Angiosperms
- Clade: Monocots
- Clade: Commelinids
- Order: Poales
- Family: Poaceae
- Genus: Cyrtochloa
- Species: C. puser

Binomial name
- Cyrtochloa puser S.Dransf.

Species of plant

Cyrtochloa puser is a species of flowering plant in the family Poaceae, native to Luzon in the Philippines. A climbing bamboo, it is used for basket weaving and related crafts.
