= Temochloa =

Scientific classification
- Kingdom: Plantae
- Clade: Tracheophytes
- Clade: Angiosperms
- Clade: Monocots
- Clade: Commelinids
- Order: Poales
- Family: Poaceae
- Tribe: Bambuseae
- Genus: Temochloa; S.Dransf. (2000)
- Species: T. liliana

Binomial name
- Temochloa liliana S.Dransf. (2000)

Genus of flowering plants

Temochloa is a genus of flowering plants belonging to the family Poaceae. It contains a single species, Temochloa liliana. It is a bamboo endemic to Thailand.
