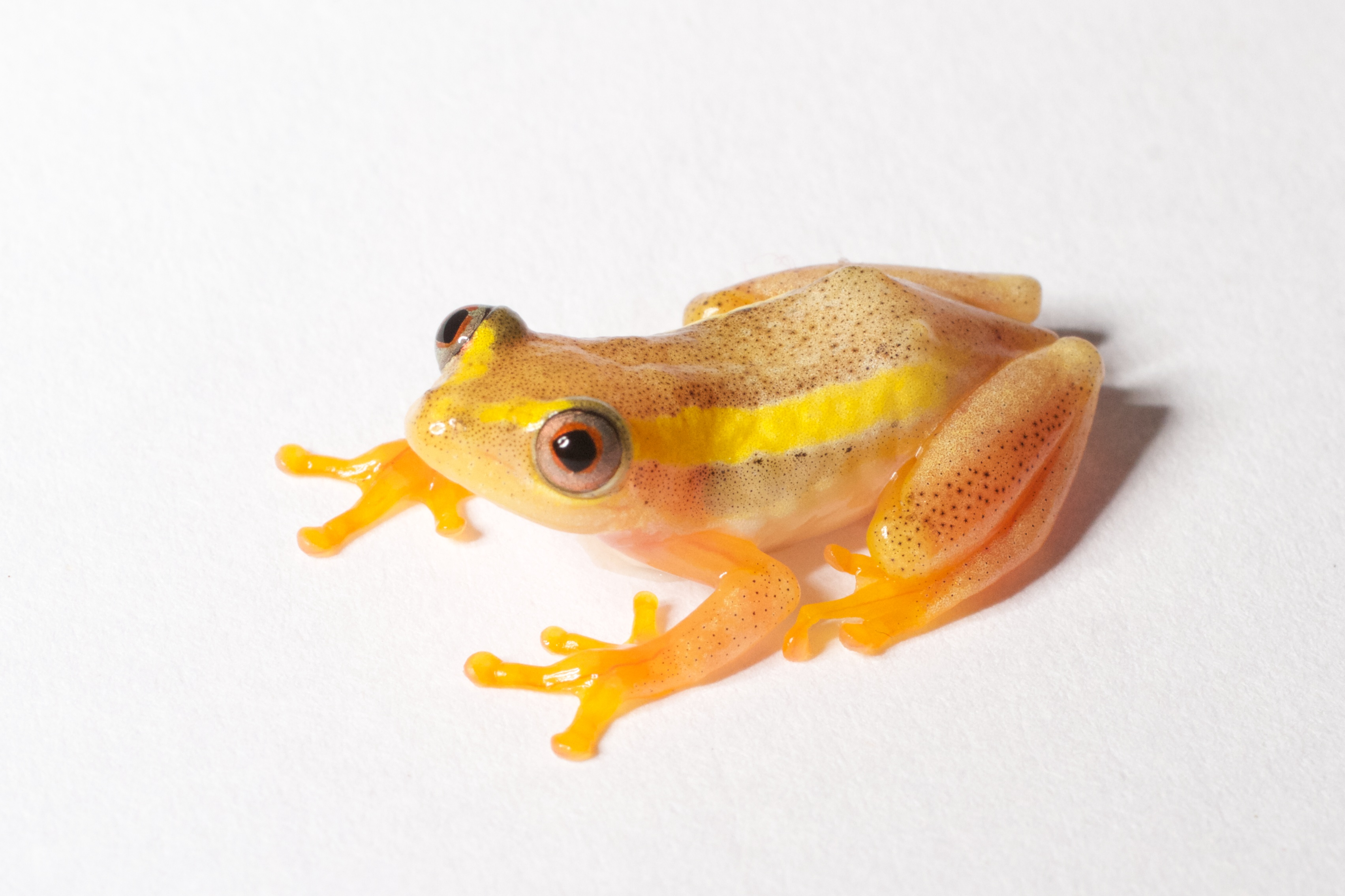

Conservation status
- Least Concern (IUCN 3.1)

Scientific classification
- Kingdom: Animalia
- Phylum: Chordata
- Class: Amphibia
- Order: Anura
- Family: Hyperoliidae
- Genus: Heterixalus
- Species: H. betsileo

Binomial name
- Heterixalus betsileo (Grandidier, 1872)

Synonyms
- Eucnemis betsileo Grandidier, 1872; Heterixalus renifer (Boettger, 1881); Hyperolius betsileo (Grandidier, 1872); Hyperolius friedrichsi Ahl, 1930; Hyperolius renifer Boettger, 1881; Megalixalus betsileo (Grandidier, 1872); Megalixalus renifer (Boettger, 1881); Rappia betsileo (Grandidier, 1872); Rappia renifer (Boettger, 1881); Rappia renifera (Boettger, 1881)

= Heterixalus betsileo =

Species of amphibian

Heterixalus betsileo is a species of frogs in the family Hyperoliidae endemic to Madagascar. Its natural habitats are subtropical or tropical moist lowland forests, subtropical or tropical moist montane forests, moist savanna, subtropical or tropical seasonally wet or flooded lowland grassland, subtropical or tropical high-altitude grassland, swamps, freshwater marshes, intermittent freshwater marshes, arable land, rural gardens, urban areas, heavily degraded former forests, ponds, irrigated land, seasonally flooded agricultural land, and canals and ditches.
