= Sphaerobambos =

Scientific classification
- Kingdom: Plantae
- Clade: Tracheophytes
- Clade: Angiosperms
- Clade: Monocots
- Clade: Commelinids
- Order: Poales
- Family: Poaceae
- Subfamily: Bambusoideae
- Tribe: Bambuseae
- Subtribe: Dinochloinae
- Genus: Sphaerobambos; S.Dransf.

Genus of bamboo

Sphaerobambos is a genus of Southeast Asian bamboo, in the grass family.

Species

1. Sphaerobambos hirsuta S.Dransf. - Sabah
2. Sphaerobambos philippinensis (Gamble) S.Dransf. - Mindanao
3. Sphaerobambos subtilis S.Dransf. - Sulawesi
