= Vietnamosasa =

Scientific classification
- Kingdom: Plantae
- Clade: Tracheophytes
- Clade: Angiosperms
- Clade: Monocots
- Clade: Commelinids
- Order: Poales
- Family: Poaceae
- Subfamily: Bambusoideae
- Tribe: Bambuseae
- Subtribe: Bambusinae
- Genus: Vietnamosasa; T.Q.Nguyen

Genus of grasses

Vietnamosasa is a genus of Indochinese bamboo in the grass family.

Species

1. Vietnamosasa ciliata (A.Camus) T.Q.Nguyen – Cambodia, Laos, Vietnam
2. Vietnamosasa darlacensis T.Q.Nguyen – Vietnam
3. Vietnamosasa pusilla (A.Chev. & A.Camus) T.Q.Nguyen – Cambodia, Laos, Vietnam, Thailand
