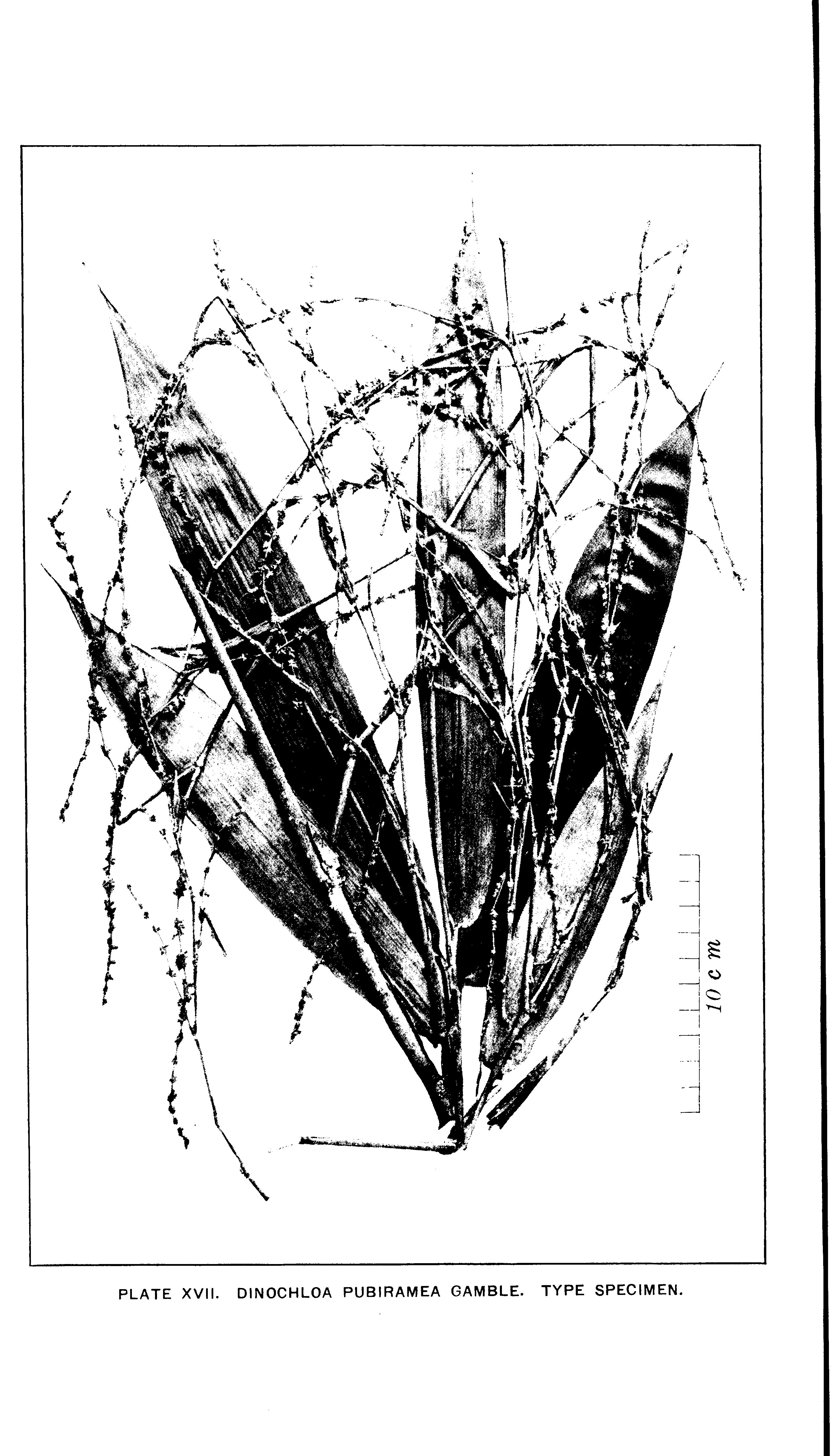
- Dinochloa pubiramea

Scientific classification
- Kingdom: Plantae
- Clade: Tracheophytes
- Clade: Angiosperms
- Clade: Monocots
- Clade: Commelinids
- Order: Poales
- Family: Poaceae
- Clade: BOP clade
- Subfamily: Bambusoideae
- Tribe: Bambuseae
- Subtribe: Dinochloinae
- Genus: Dinochloa; Büse

Type species
- Dinochloa tjankorreh (Schult.) Büse

= Dinochloa =

Genus of grasses

Dinochloa is a genus of tropical clumping high-climbing bamboos in the grass family.

These species bear zigzag culms and fleshy fruits. They are found in the hill forests and lowland dipterocarp forest of southern China, Southeast Asia, and the eastern part of the Indian subcontinent.

== Species ==
44 species are accepted.

- Dinochloa acutiflora (Munro) S.Dransf.
- Dinochloa alata McClure
- Dinochloa albociliata Widjaja
- Dinochloa andamanica Kurz
- Dinochloa aopaensis Widjaja
- Dinochloa bapoensis Hsueh f. & Y.M.Yang
- Dinochloa barbata S.Dransf.
- Dinochloa bungintimbensis Widjaja & Ervianti
- Dinochloa cordata S.Dransf.
- Dinochloa darvelana S.Dransf.
- Dinochloa dielsiana Pilg.
- Dinochloa elmeri Gamble
- Dinochloa erecta Widjaja
- Dinochloa glabra Widjaja & Ervianti
- Dinochloa glabrescens Widjaja
- Dinochloa hirsuta S.Dransf.
- Dinochloa karaboensis Widjaja & Ervianti
- Dinochloa khoonmengii Widjaja & Ervianti
- Dinochloa kolakaensis Widjaja & Ervianti
- Dinochloa kostermansiana S.Dransf.
- Dinochloa luconiae (Munro) Merr.
- Dinochloa macclellandii (Munro) Kurz
- Dinochloa malayana S.Dransf.
- Dinochloa matmat S.Dransf. & Widjaja
- Dinochloa mekonggensis Widjaja & Ervianti
- Dinochloa morowaliensis Widjaja
- Dinochloa multibrachiata Widjaja & Ervianti
- Dinochloa nicobariana R.B.Majumdar
- Dinochloa obclavata S.Dransf.
- Dinochloa oblonga S.Dransf.
- Dinochloa palawanensis (Gamble) S.Dransf.
- Dinochloa petasiensis Widjaja
- Dinochloa prunifera S.Dransf.
- Dinochloa pubiramea Gamble
- Dinochloa robusta S.Dransf.
- Dinochloa scabrida S.Dransf.
- Dinochloa scandens (Blume ex Nees) Kuntze
- Dinochloa sepang Widjaja & Astuti
- Dinochloa sessilifolia Widjaja & Ervianti
- Dinochloa sipitangensis S.Dransf.
- Dinochloa sublaevigata S.Dransf.
- Dinochloa trichogona S.Dransf.
- Dinochloa truncata Widjaja
- Dinochloa wartabonei Widjaja & Ervianti

=== formerly included ===
See Cyrtochloa, Maclurochloa, and Melocalamus

- Dinochloa compactiflora - Melocalamus compactiflorus
- Dinochloa elevatissima - Melocalamus elevatissimus
- Dinochloa gracilis - Melocalamus mastersii
- Dinochloa indica - Melocalamus indicus
- Dinochloa major - Cyrtochloa major
- Dinochloa montana - Maclurochloa montana
