= Pseudobambusa =

Scientific classification
- Kingdom: Plantae
- Clade: Tracheophytes
- Clade: Angiosperms
- Clade: Monocots
- Clade: Commelinids
- Order: Poales
- Family: Poaceae
- Subfamily: Bambusoideae
- Tribe: Bambuseae
- Subtribe: Bambusinae
- Genus: Pseudobambusa; T.Q.Nguyen
- Species: P. schizostachyoides

Binomial name
- Pseudobambusa schizostachyoides (Kurz) T.Q.Nguyen

Synonyms
- Bambusa schizostachyoides (Kurz) Gamble; Cephalostachyum schizostachyoides Kurz; Teinostachyum schisostachyoides (Kurz) Kurz; Bambusa kurzii (Munro) N.P.Balakr.; Bambusa schizostachyoides Kurz ex Munro; Melocanna kurzii Munro; Pseudobambusa kurzii (Munro) Ohrnb.; Schizostachyum kurzii (Munro) R.B.Majumdar

Species of grass

Pseudobambusa schizostachyoides is a species of bamboo in the monotypic genus Pseudobambusa, of the tribe Bambuseae in the family Poaceae.

== Distribution and description ==
The recorded distribution includes the Andaman Islands, Myanmar and Vietnam: where the plant is called nứa, although this name may also apply to the genus Schizostachyum.

This bamboo grows as a plant from 3 to 10 m tall, with thin-walled internodes up to 600 mm long. Leaves are from 100-180 mm long.
