= Heterixalus tricolor =

Conservation status
- Least Concern (IUCN 3.1)

Scientific classification
- Kingdom: Animalia
- Phylum: Chordata
- Class: Amphibia
- Order: Anura
- Family: Hyperoliidae
- Genus: Heterixalus
- Species: H. tricolor

Binomial name
- Heterixalus tricolor (Boettger, 1881)

Species of amphibian

Heterixalus tricolor is a species of frogs in the family Hyperoliidae endemic to Madagascar. Its natural habitats are subtropical or tropical dry forests, moist savanna, subtropical or tropical seasonally wet or flooded lowland grassland, swamps, freshwater marshes, intermittent freshwater marshes, arable land, heavily degraded former forests, ponds, irrigated land, seasonally flooded agricultural land, and canals and ditches.
