= Hitchcockella =

Scientific classification
- Kingdom: Plantae
- Clade: Tracheophytes
- Clade: Angiosperms
- Clade: Monocots
- Clade: Commelinids
- Order: Poales
- Family: Poaceae
- Subfamily: Bambusoideae
- Tribe: Bambuseae
- Subtribe: Hickeliinae
- Genus: Hitchcockella; A.Camus
- Species: H. baronii

Binomial name
- Hitchcockella baronii A.Camus

Genus of grasses

Hitchcockella baronii is a species of bamboo, the only known species of the genus Hitchcockella. It is found in Madagascar and was first described by Aimée Antoinette Camus in 1925.
