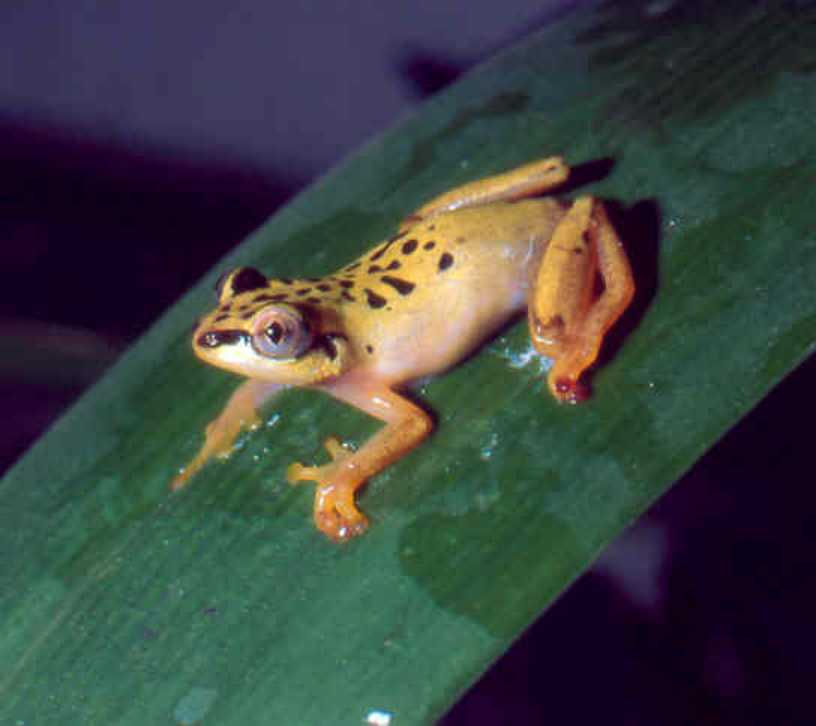

Conservation status
- Least Concern (IUCN 3.1)

Scientific classification
- Kingdom: Animalia
- Phylum: Chordata
- Class: Amphibia
- Order: Anura
- Family: Hyperoliidae
- Genus: Heterixalus
- Species: H. variabilis

Binomial name
- Heterixalus variabilis (Ahl, 1930)

= Heterixalus variabilis =

Species of frog

Heterixalus variabilis is a species of frog in the family Hyperoliidae endemic to Madagascar. Its natural habitats are moist savanna, subtropical or tropical seasonally wet or flooded lowland grassland, swamps, freshwater marshes, intermittent freshwater marshes, arable land, urban areas, heavily degraded former forests, ponds, irrigated land, seasonally flooded agricultural land, and canals and ditches.
