= 1980 Dominican Republic Embassy siege in Bogotá =

Siege by M-19 guerillas in Colombia

Coordinates: 4.5981°N 74.0758°W

Dominican Republic Embassy Siege
- Part of Colombian armed conflict
- 1980 Dominican Republic Embassy siege in Bogotá (Colombia)
| Date | 27 February – 27 April 1980 |
| Location | Bogotá, Colombia |
| Result | All hostages are released, captors flee to Cuba. |

Belligerents
| Colombia; United States | M19 |

Commanders and leaders
| (Colombia) Oscar Pelaez Carmona (United States) Anthony Quainton | Rosemberg Pabón; Carmenza Cardona Londoño |

Units involved
| Colombian Army | Freedom or Democracy |

Strength
| ~500 | 16 |

Casualties and losses
| None | 1 killed |
- 5 civilians wounded

The Dominican Republic Embassy siege was the 1980 siege of the embassy of the Dominican Republic by M-19 guerrillas in Bogotá, Colombia. The guerrillas held nearly 60 people, including 15 ambassadors, hostage. Of the initial group, 18 were held captive for 61 days.

== Siege ==
The siege began on the mid-day of February 27, 1980, when seventeen guerrillas dressed in the warm-up clothes of joggers stormed the embassy compound, located in a suburb of Bogotá. Many diplomats were attending a diplomatic reception celebrating Dominican Independence Day and consequently were taken hostage. The guerrillas, wielding grenades and AK-47s, wounded five people in the storming of the embassy. One of the guerrillas was killed initially by the police.

Within 30 minutes of learning that the Dominican Embassy had been seized, a Colombian task force was established on the State Department's 7th floor. Anthony Quainton, director of the State Department's office for combatting terrorism, was named to head the task force. Colombian National Police occupied strategic positions around the embassy.

The hostages included the Papal nuncio to Colombia, Angelo Acerbi, as well as the ambassadors from fourteen countries: Austria, Brazil, Costa Rica, the Dominican Republic, Egypt, El Salvador, Guatemala, Haiti, Israel, Mexico, Switzerland, the United States (Diego C. Asencio), Uruguay, and Venezuela. Also among the hostages were diplomats from Bolivia, Jamaica, Paraguay and Peru, and Colombian civilians and workers at the embassy.

The gunmen demanded US$50 million, to be raised from the countries whose diplomats were held hostage. They also sought the release of 311 jailed comrades. Their leader, who called himself "Commandante Uno," was later identified as Rosemberg Pabón.

Colombian authorities began negotiating with the guerrillas after they threatened to kill the hostages. On February 28, eighteen people, including the Costa Rican ambassador and fourteen other women, were freed by the hostage takers. Five more women were released on February 29. Negotiations gained the release of four cooks and a waiter on March 2.

The Austrian ambassador was freed on March 6 out of consideration for his wife, who was in hospital at the time. On March 8, the guerrillas reduced their demands to free 311 prisoners to seventy and lowered the amount of money requested to US$10 million. Early on March 17, the Uruguayan ambassador, Fernando Gomez Fyns, escaped from the embassy by jumping from a window and running to troops surrounding the compound. The same day, Fidel Castro offered the guerrillas asylum in Cuba.

From March 30 to April 19, the guerrillas released the Costa Rican consul and all of the remaining non-diplomatic hostages. They requested a meeting in Panama with Colombian leaders to resolve the crisis, but were denied by the Colombian government. Their demand for the release of a dozen prisoners was denied, though they were paid US$2.5 million in ransom money.

On April 27, the ambassadors from Venezuela, the Dominican Republic, Israel, and Egypt were released by the hostage takers, along with two Colombians. The sixteen guerrillas left the embassy with the remaining twelve diplomatic hostages under the supervision of the Inter-American Human Rights Commission of the Organization of American States, and boarded a Cubana Airlines flight to Cuba. They were cheered by many Colombians waiting for them at the airport. They flew to Havana, where the diplomats were released and returned to their home countries.

== Aftermath ==
The leader of the M-19 group, Rosemberg Pabón, promised to return to Colombia. After living in exile in Cuba, he eventually returned to Colombia in time to participate in the M-19's siege of his home town of Yumbo. The M-19's second in command, a guerrilla named Carmenza Cardona Londoño, known by her nom de guerre 'La Chiqui', returned to Colombia after spending some time in Havana, and died in combat with the Colombian Army a few years later. The M-19's third in command during the Embassy Siege, Ligia Vasquez, known as 'Commander Maria', was granted political asylum by France. She currently lives in Strasbourg.

== Media ==
- The film La toma de la embajada (2000), directed by Ciro Durán, offers a dramatized portrayal of the siege. While incorporating real archival footage and events, the movie blends historical elements with fictionalized storytelling to explore the interpersonal relationships that develop between the guerrillas and their diplomatic hostages during the two-month standoff.

== See also ==
- List of attacks on diplomatic missions
