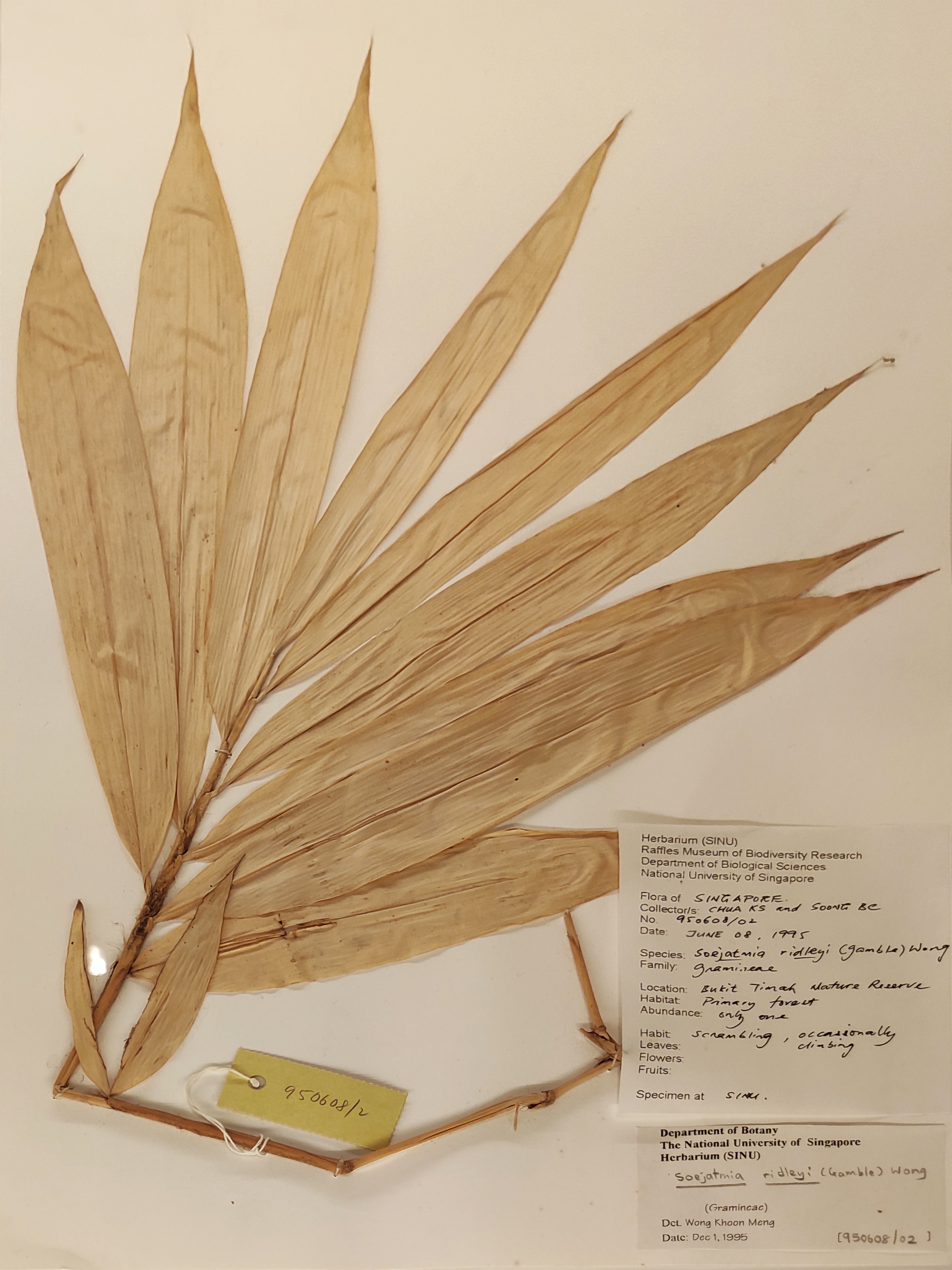
- Soejatmia ridleyi

Scientific classification
- Kingdom: Plantae
- Clade: Tracheophytes
- Clade: Angiosperms
- Clade: Monocots
- Clade: Commelinids
- Order: Poales
- Family: Poaceae
- Subfamily: Bambusoideae
- Tribe: Bambuseae
- Subtribe: Bambusinae
- Genus: Soejatmia; K.M.Wong
- Species: S. ridleyi

Binomial name
- Soejatmia ridleyi (Gamble) K.M.Wong

Synonyms
- Bambusa ridleyi Gamble

= Soejatmia =

Species of grass

Soejatmia is a monotypic genus of flowering plants belonging to the family Poaceae. It just contains one species, Soejatmia ridleyi (Gamble) K.M.Wong

Its native range is from the peninsula of Thailand to Malaya.

The genus name of Soejatmia is in honour of Soejatmi Dransfield (b. 1939), an Indonesia-born British plant taxonomist specializing in bamboos and also honorary research fellow at the Royal Botanic Gardens, Kew. The Latin specific epithet of ridleyi refers to Henry Nicholas Ridley (1855 – 1956), was an English botanist, geologist and naturalist who lived much of his life in Singapore. Both the genus and the species were first described and published in Kew Bull. Vol.48 on pages 530-532 in 1993.

The genus is recognized by the United States Department of Agriculture and the Agricultural Research Service, but they do not list any known species.
