= Decaryochloa =

- Decaryochloa diadelpha in Ankondromara, Madagascar

Conservation status
- Endangered (IUCN 3.1)

Scientific classification
- Kingdom: Plantae
- Clade: Tracheophytes
- Clade: Angiosperms
- Clade: Monocots
- Clade: Commelinids
- Order: Poales
- Family: Poaceae
- Subfamily: Bambusoideae
- Tribe: Bambuseae
- Subtribe: Hickeliinae
- Genus: Decaryochloa; A.Camus
- Species: D. diadelpha

Binomial name
- Decaryochloa diadelpha A.Camus

Genus of grasses

Decaryochloa is a genus of Madagascan bamboo in the grass family.

There is only one known species, Decaryochloa diadelpha, found only in Madagascar.

== Description ==
Decaryochloa is a bamboo liana. It flowers in April.

== Range and habitat ==
Decaryochloa is found only in Alaotra Mangoro region of eastern Madagascar. Its estimated extent of occurrence (EOO) is 856 km^{2} and its estimated area of occupancy (AOO) is 20 km^{2}.

It is native to humid lowland and lower montane forest between 500 and 1,072 meters elevation.

Five populations of the species are known, and there are 10 records of the species. It is threatened with habitat loss across its small range from deforestation for timber, shifting cultivation, conversion of land for agriculture, and mining. Its conservation status is assessed as endangered.
