= Alvimia =

Scientific classification
- Kingdom: Plantae
- Clade: Tracheophytes
- Clade: Angiosperms
- Clade: Monocots
- Clade: Commelinids
- Order: Poales
- Family: Poaceae
- Subfamily: Bambusoideae
- Tribe: Bambuseae
- Subtribe: Arthrostylidiinae
- Genus: Alvimia; C. E. Calderón ex Soderstrom & Londoño

Type species
- Alvimia auriculata Soderstrom & Londoño

Genus of grasses

Alvimia is a Brazilian genus of bamboo in the grass family. It is native to the eastern coastal regions of the State of Bahia in eastern Brazil.

Species

1. Alvimia auriculata Soderstr. & Londoño
2. Alvimia gracilis Soderstr. & Londoño
3. Alvimia lancifolia Soderstr. & Londoño

== See also ==
- List of Poaceae genera
