= Pinga marginata =

Scientific classification
- Kingdom: Plantae
- Clade: Tracheophytes
- Clade: Angiosperms
- Clade: Monocots
- Clade: Commelinids
- Order: Poales
- Family: Poaceae
- Tribe: Bambuseae
- Subtribe: Dinochloinae
- Genus: Pinga; Widjaja
- Species: P. marginata

Binomial name
- Pinga marginata Widjaja

Species of grass

Pinga marginata is a species of bamboo, and the sole species in genus Pinga. It is native to western New Guinea.
