= Heterixalus andrakata =

Conservation status
- Least Concern (IUCN 3.1)

Scientific classification
- Kingdom: Animalia
- Phylum: Chordata
- Class: Amphibia
- Order: Anura
- Family: Hyperoliidae
- Genus: Heterixalus
- Species: H. andrakata

Binomial name
- Heterixalus andrakata Glaw & Vences, 1991

Species of amphibian

Heterixalus andrakata is a species of frogs in the family Hyperoliidae endemic to Madagascar. Its natural habitats are subtropical or tropical moist lowland forests, subtropical or tropical seasonally wet or flooded lowland grassland, swamps, freshwater marshes, intermittent freshwater marshes, urban areas, heavily degraded former forests, ponds, irrigated land, and seasonally flooded agricultural land.
