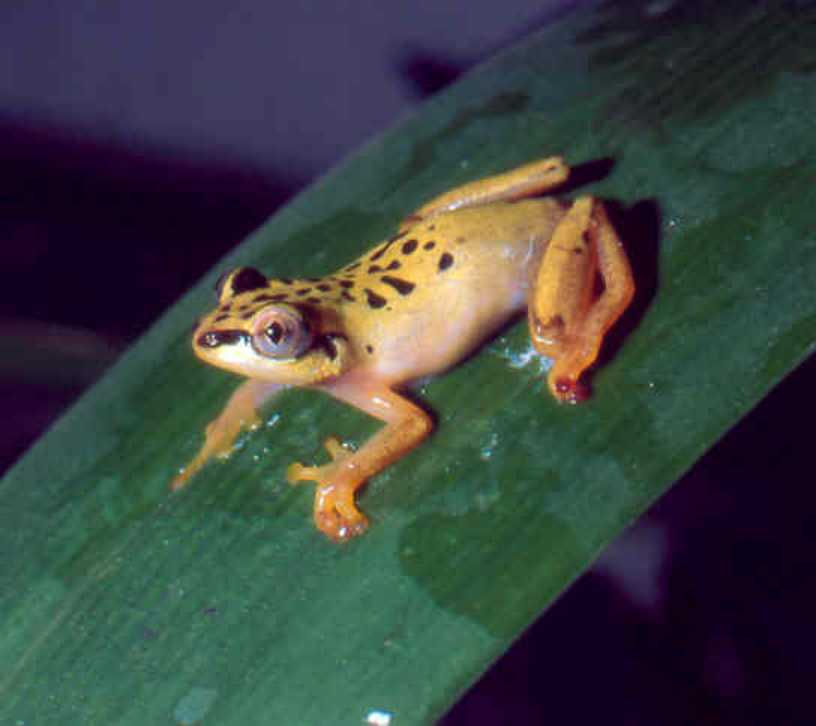
- Heterixalus variabilis

Scientific classification
- Kingdom: Animalia
- Phylum: Chordata
- Class: Amphibia
- Order: Anura
- Family: Hyperoliidae
- Genus: Heterixalus; Laurent, 1944

Type species
- Eucnemis madagascariensis Duméril and Bibron, 1841

Diversity
- 11 species

= Heterixalus =

Genus of amphibians

Heterixalus is a genus of frogs within the family Hyperoliidae, endemic to Madagascar. It is the sister taxon to the genus Tachycnemis. These frogs are commonly referred to as Madagascar reed frogs. Heterixalus species are colorful, small to medium-sized frogs ranging from 18-40 mm in length. They have webbing on both the front and back feet, and the digits and webbing are typically yellow and orange. The tips of the digits are circularly enlarged, and the lateral metatarsalia are connected. Distinct among Malagasy frogs, the pupil is shaped as a "vertical rhomboid," with the anterior side pointed outward and the posterior side semicircular. Additionally, vomerine teeth are absent. Males are slightly smaller than females and can be told apart from the latter by weakly developed nuptial pads and a single, distensible vocal sac.

Heterixalus species tend to be very variable in color and patterning, and up to three species can be found at the same location. Therefore, while many species do have characteristic coloration, the best way to distinguish species and species complexes are by call. Typically, Heterixalus species live outside dense forests, where they inhabit sunlit pools, swamps and ricefields.

== Species ==
Heterixalus contains 11 species:

Image	Scientific name	Distribution
	Heterixalus alboguttatus (Boulenger, 1882)	Madagascar
	Heterixalus andrakata Glaw and Vences, 1991	Madagascar.
	Heterixalus betsileo (Grandidier, 1872)	Madagascar
	Heterixalus boettgeri (Mocquard, 1902)	Madagascar
	Heterixalus carbonei Vences, Glaw, Jesu, and Schimmenti, 2000	Madagascar
	Heterixalus luteostriatus (Andersson, 1910)	Madagascar
	Heterixalus madagascariensis (Duméril and Bibron, 1841)	Madagascar
	Heterixalus punctatus Glaw and Vences, 1994	Madagascar
	Heterixalus rutenbergi (Boettger, 1881)	Madagascar
	Heterixalus tricolor (Boettger, 1881)	Madagascar
	Heterixalus variabilis (Ahl, 1930)	Madagascar
