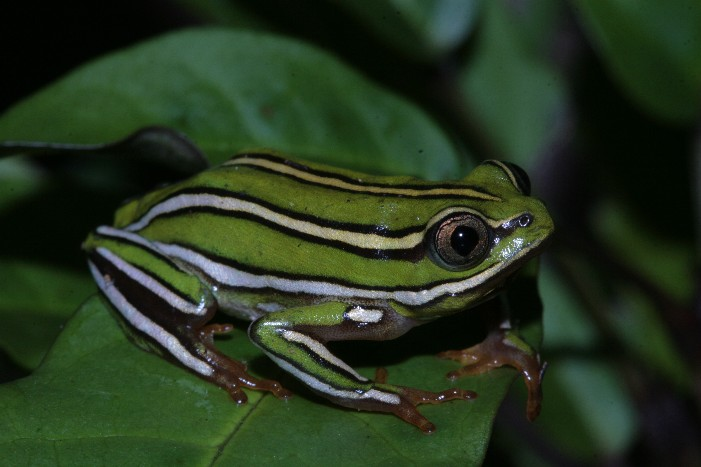

Conservation status
- Least Concern (IUCN 3.1)

Scientific classification
- Kingdom: Animalia
- Phylum: Chordata
- Class: Amphibia
- Order: Anura
- Family: Hyperoliidae
- Genus: Heterixalus
- Species: H. rutenbergi

Binomial name
- Heterixalus rutenbergi (Boettger, 1881)

= Heterixalus rutenbergi =

Species of amphibian

Heterixalus rutenbergi is a species of frogs in the family Hyperoliidae endemic to Madagascar. Its natural habitats are subtropical or tropical high-altitude grassland, swamps, freshwater marshes, intermittent freshwater marshes, and arable land. It is threatened by habitat loss.

== Description ==
Heterixalus rutenbergi averages 25 mm (0.98 in) in length. The dorsal surface of this frog is light green. It has five white bands bordered by dark brown stripes that run longitudinally along its back. On the sides of the limbs are two similar bands, and one along the feet. The ventral surface is cream-colored, and the undersides of limbs are orange.
