= Cochinchinochloa =

Scientific classification
- Kingdom: Plantae
- Clade: Tracheophytes
- Clade: Angiosperms
- Clade: Monocots
- Clade: Commelinids
- Order: Poales
- Family: Poaceae
- Subfamily: Bambusoideae
- Tribe: Bambuseae
- Subtribe: Bambusinae
- Genus: Cochinchinochloa; H.N.Nguyen & V.T.Tran (2013)
- Species: C. braiana

Binomial name
- Cochinchinochloa braiana H.N.Nguyen & V.T.Tran (2013)

Genus of flowering plants

Cochinchinochloa is a genus of flowering plants belonging to the family Poaceae. It contains a single species, Cochinchinochloa braiana, a bamboo endemic to Vietnam.
