= Temburongia =

Scientific classification
- Kingdom: Plantae
- Clade: Tracheophytes
- Clade: Angiosperms
- Clade: Monocots
- Clade: Commelinids
- Order: Poales
- Family: Poaceae
- Clade: BOP clade
- Subfamily: Bambusoideae
- Tribe: Bambuseae
- Subtribe: Temburongiinae
- Genus: Temburongia; S.Dransf. & K.M.Wong
- Species: T. simplex

Binomial name
- Temburongia simplex S.Dransf. & K.M.Wong

Genus of grasses

Temburongia is a genus of bamboo from the Sultanate of Brunei on the Island of Borneo. It is usually classified in the subtribe Shibataeinae, though its exact relationship with the subtribe remains unclear.

== Species ==
The only described species is Temburongia simplex.
