= Apoclada =

Scientific classification
- Kingdom: Plantae
- Clade: Embryophytes
- Clade: Tracheophytes
- Clade: Spermatophytes
- Clade: Angiosperms
- Clade: Monocots
- Clade: Commelinids
- Order: Poales
- Family: Poaceae
- Subfamily: Bambusoideae
- Tribe: Bambuseae
- Subtribe: Guaduinae
- Genus: Apoclada; McClure
- Species: A. simplex

Binomial name
- Apoclada simplex McClure & L.B.Sm.

Synonyms
- Apoclada diversa McClure

Genus of grasses

Apoclada is a genus of Brazilian bamboo in the grass family).

The only known species is Apoclada simplex, found in the forests of southeastern Brazil (States of Santa Catarina, Paraná, and São Paulo).

The genus was for many years thought to contain four species (Apoclada cannavieira, A. arenicola, A. diversa & A. simplex) Upon further examination and fieldwork at the collection locality, the single piece of material at the US National Herbarium from which A. diversa had been described, was found to be merely a deformed stem of A. simplex Later, with revised concepts of morphological interpretation in the bamboos and strong molecular evidence it became clear that the two species formerly known as A. arenicola, and A. cannavieira which are endemic to the cerrado of central Brazil are actually unrelated to A. simplex and are correctly placed in their own genus Filgueirasia.

The stems of this bamboo grow to more than 13 m tall although half that is more common. Like all bamboos, the upright stems (also called culms) grow from horizontal underground stems called rhizomes. In A. simplex these rhizomes can be more than 40 cm long, thus although this species is technically a clumping type of bamboo, groves of it often appear much like those of the Asian running bamboos because of the long distance between culms. The culms are light to dark green or sometimes reddish, and about 1.9–4 cm in diameter with internodes every 7–38 cm. The foliage leaf blades are long and thin, 1.3–16.4 cm long and 2–7 mm wide.

formerly included

see Filgueirasia

- Apoclada arenicola - Filgueirasia arenicola
- Apoclada cannavieira - Filgueirasia cannavieira

== See also ==
- List of Poaceae genera
