= Perrierbambus =

Scientific classification
- Kingdom: Plantae
- Clade: Tracheophytes
- Clade: Angiosperms
- Clade: Monocots
- Clade: Commelinids
- Order: Poales
- Family: Poaceae
- Subfamily: Bambusoideae
- Tribe: Bambuseae
- Subtribe: Hickeliinae
- Genus: Perrierbambus; A.Camus

Type species
- Perrierbambus madagascariensis A.Camus

Genus of grasses

Perrierbambus is a genus of Madagascan bamboo in the grass family.

The genus name of Perrierbambus is in honour of Joseph Marie Henry Alfred Perrier de la Bâthie (1873–1958), a French botanist who specialized in the plants of Madagascar. It was first described and published in Bull. Soc. Bot. France Vol.71 on pages 699-700 in 1924.

Species

1. Perrierbambus madagascariensis A. Camus
2. Perrierbambus tsarasaotrensis A. Camus
