= Filgueirasia =

Scientific classification
- Kingdom: Plantae
- Clade: Tracheophytes
- Clade: Angiosperms
- Clade: Monocots
- Clade: Commelinids
- Order: Poales
- Family: Poaceae
- Subfamily: Bambusoideae
- Tribe: Bambuseae
- Subtribe: Arthrostylidiinae
- Genus: Filgueirasia; Guala

Genus of grasses

Filgueirasia is a genus of Brazilian bamboo in the grass family.

Members of the genus were originally published as species of Apoclada and were classified in that genus for many years.

Over time, with revised concepts of morphological interpretation in the bamboos and the accumulation of strong molecular evidence it became clear that the two species formerly known as A. arenicola, and A. cannavieira are actually unrelated to A. simplex and are correctly placed in their own genus Filgueirasia.

The genus was named after Dr. Tarciso Filgueiras who has researched grasses of Brazil, especially those of the Cerrado region. There is a photograph of him in a patch of F. arenicola on the cover of the journal in which the genus was published - cited above and linked below.

Both species are unusual in many respects. They display the unique (or nearly so depending on interpretation) condition in the bamboos of having the ability to give rise to branches from multiple equal primary branch buds at their nodes. They are also some of the most drought tolerant of the bamboos and are well adapted to fire. They serve as forage for cattle and wildlife, especially in the dry season when the above ground parts of many other grasses are dead. Although both species are highly adapted to the cerrado biome, they have separate ranges and different habitat requirements including soils and climate.

Species

- Filgueirasia arenicola (McClure) Guala - Mato Grosso, Mato Grosso do Sul, Goiás
- Filgueirasia cannavieira (Silveira) Guala - Minas Gerais, Distrito Federal
