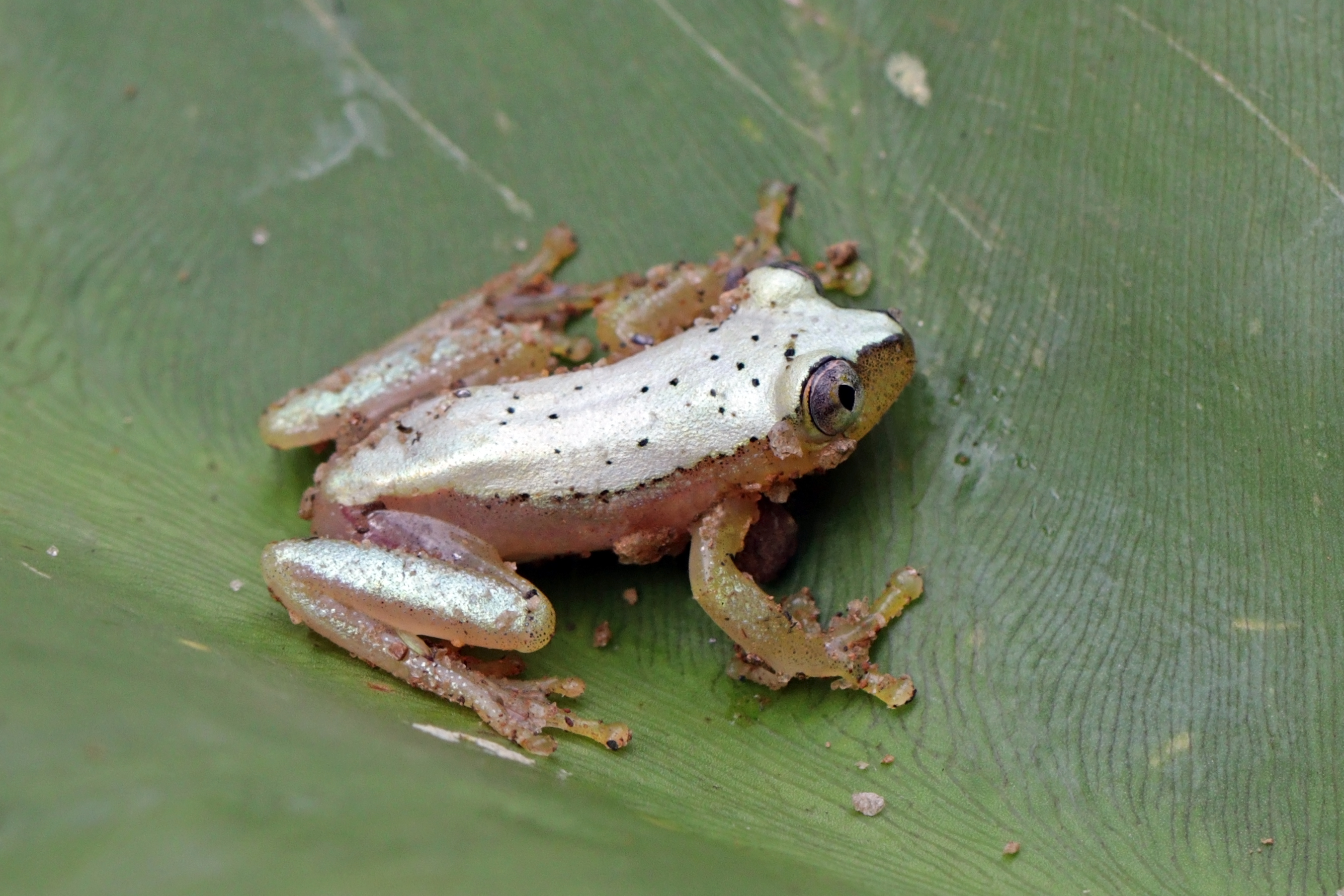
- Andasibe-Mantadia National Park

Conservation status
- Least Concern (IUCN 3.1)

Scientific classification
- Kingdom: Animalia
- Phylum: Chordata
- Class: Amphibia
- Order: Anura
- Family: Hyperoliidae
- Genus: Heterixalus
- Species: H. punctatus

Binomial name
- Heterixalus punctatus Glaw & Vences, 1994

= Heterixalus punctatus =

Species of amphibian

Heterixalus punctatus is a species of frogs in the family Hyperoliidae endemic to Madagascar. Its natural habitats are subtropical or tropical moist lowland forests, swamps, freshwater marshes, intermittent freshwater marshes, arable land, rural gardens, heavily degraded former forests, ponds, irrigated land, and seasonally flooded agricultural land.
