= Ruhooglandia =

Scientific classification
- Kingdom: Plantae
- Clade: Tracheophytes
- Clade: Angiosperms
- Clade: Monocots
- Clade: Commelinids
- Order: Poales
- Family: Poaceae
- Subfamily: Bambusoideae
- Tribe: Bambuseae
- Genus: Ruhooglandia; S.Dransf. & K.M.Wong
- Species: R. hooglandii

Binomial name
- Ruhooglandia hooglandii (Holttum) S.Dransf. & K.M.Wong

Synonyms
- Nastus hooglandii Holttum

Genus of flowering plants

Ruhooglandia is a monotypic genus of flowering plants belonging to the family Poaceae. It contains one known species, Ruhooglandia hooglandii. It is a bamboo native to New Guinea.

It is named after the Dutch botanist Ruurd Dirk Hoogland (1922-1994).
