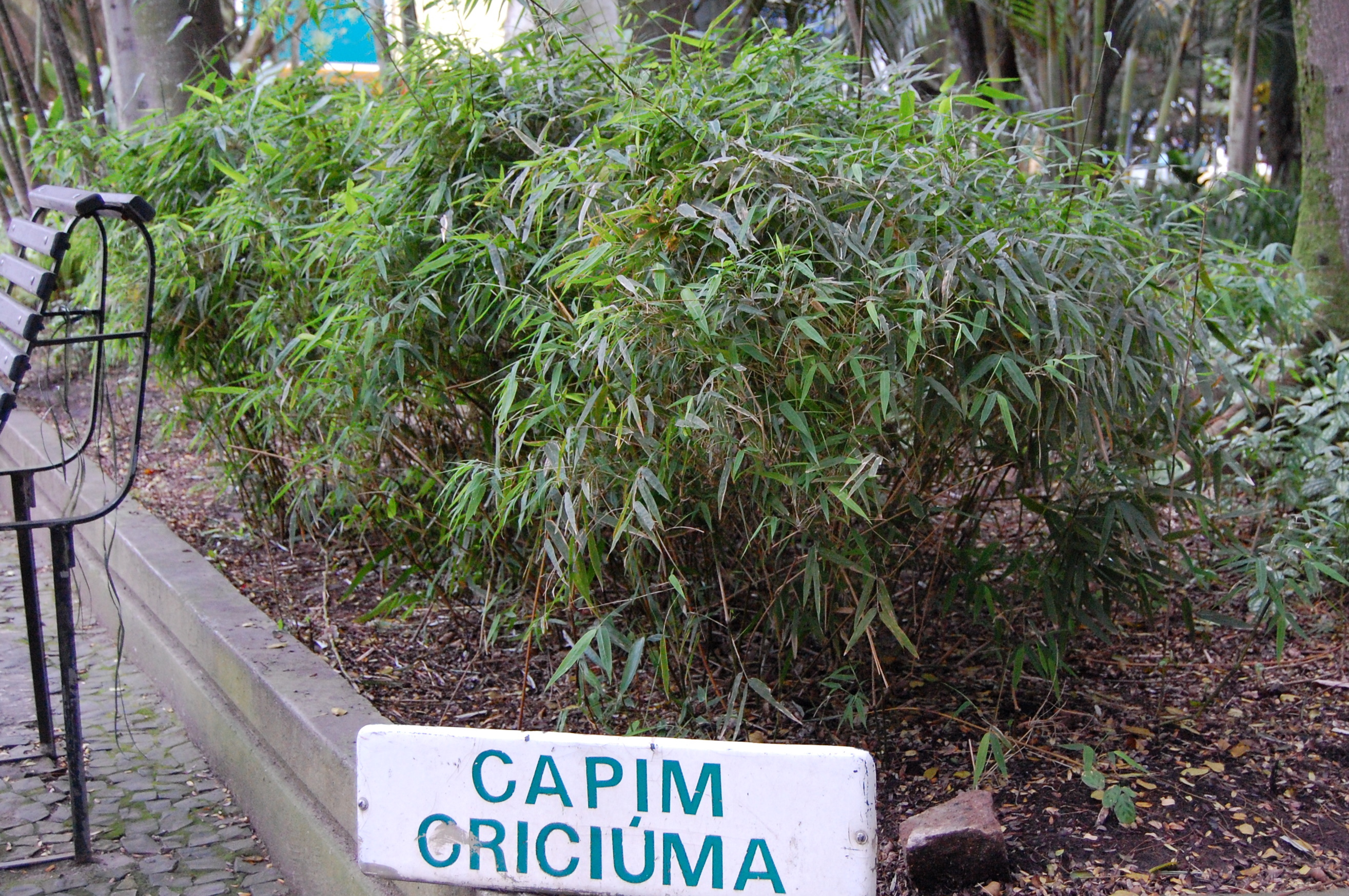
- Eremocaulon asymmetricum

Scientific classification
- Kingdom: Plantae
- Clade: Tracheophytes
- Clade: Angiosperms
- Clade: Monocots
- Clade: Commelinids
- Order: Poales
- Family: Poaceae
- Subfamily: Bambusoideae
- Tribe: Bambuseae
- Subtribe: Guaduinae
- Genus: Eremocaulon; Soderstr. & Londoño

Type species
- Eremocaulon aureofimbriatum Soderstr. & Londoño

Synonyms
- Criciuma Soderstr. & Londoño

= Eremocaulon =

Genus of grasses

Eremocaulon is a genus of Brazilian bamboo in the grass family.

Species

1. Eremocaulon amazonicum Londoño - Acre, Amazonas, Rondônia
2. Eremocaulon asymmetricum (Soderstr. & Londoño) Londoño - Bahia
3. Eremocaulon aureofimbriatum Soderstr. & Londoño - Bahia, Minas Gerais
4. Eremocaulon capitatum (Trin.) Londoño - Goiás, Mato Grosso, Mato Grosso do Sul

Formerly included

see Aulonemia

- Eremocaulon setosum - Aulonemia setosa
