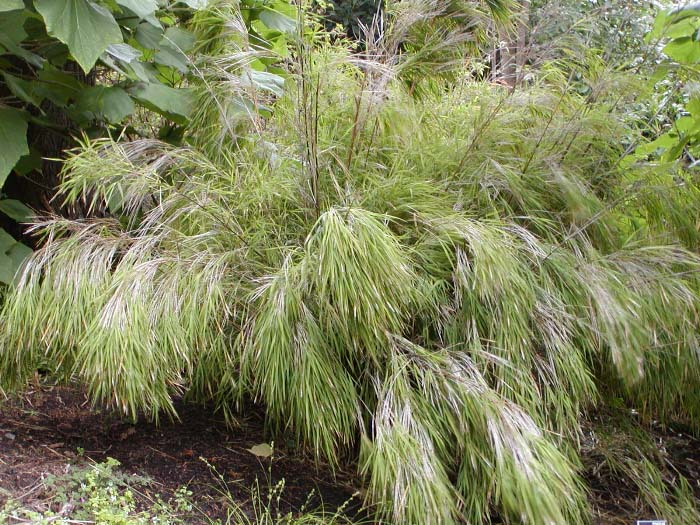
- Mexican weeping bamboo (Otatea aztecorum)

Scientific classification
- Kingdom: Plantae
- Clade: Tracheophytes
- Clade: Angiosperms
- Clade: Monocots
- Clade: Commelinids
- Order: Poales
- Family: Poaceae
- Subfamily: Bambusoideae
- Tribe: Bambuseae
- Subtribe: Guaduinae
- Genus: Otatea (McClure & E.W.Sm.) C.E.Calderón & Soderstr.

Synonyms
- Yushania subgenus Otatea McClure & E.W.Sm.

= Otatea =

Weeping bamboo

Genus of grasses

Otatea, called weeping bamboo, is a genus of clumping bamboos in the grass family, native to Mexico, Central America, and Colombia.

The name derives from the Nahuatl (Aztec) word "otatl", meaning "bamboo".

== Species ==
13 species are accepted.

- Otatea acuminata (Munro) C.E.Calderón ex Soderstr. – widespread from Chihuahua to Oaxaca
- Otatea carrilloi Ruiz-Sanchez, Sosa & Mejía-Saulés – Chiapas
- Otatea colombiana Ruiz-Sanchez & Londoño – Colombia
- Otatea fimbriata Soderstr. – widespread from Norte de Santander to Chiapas
- Otatea glauca L.G.Clark & G.Cortés – Chiapas
- Otatea nayeeri Ruiz-Sanchez – western Mexico (Durango and Nayarit)
- Otatea odam Ruiz-Sanchez & Art.Castro – Mexico (Durango and Zacatecas)
- Otatea ramirezii Ruiz-Sanchez – Querétaro
- Otatea reynosoana Ruiz-Sanchez & L.G.Clark – Guerrero, Jalisco, Nayarit
- Otatea rzedowskiorum Ruiz-Sanchez – Chiapas
- Otatea transvolcanica Ruiz-Sanchez & L.G.Clark – México State, Jalisco, Colima
- Otatea victoriae Ruiz-Sanchez – Hidalgo
- Otatea ximenae Ruiz-Sanchez & L.G.Clark – Oaxaca, Michoacán
