= Neomicrocalamus =

Scientific classification
- Kingdom: Plantae
- Clade: Tracheophytes
- Clade: Angiosperms
- Clade: Monocots
- Clade: Commelinids
- Order: Poales
- Family: Poaceae
- Subfamily: Bambusoideae
- Tribe: Bambuseae
- Subtribe: Bambusinae
- Genus: Neomicrocalamus; Keng f.

Type species
- Microcalamus prainii Gamble

Species
- See text

Synonyms
- Microcalamus Gamble 1890, illegitimate homonym not Franch. 1889

Genus of grasses

Neomicrocalamus is an Asian genus of bamboo in the grass family.

== Species ==
The genus contains the following species:

- Neomicrocalamus andropogonifolius (Griff.) Stapleton – Bhutan, Arunachal Pradesh
- Neomicrocalamus dongvanensis T.Q.Nguyen – Vietnam
- Neomicrocalamus prainii (Gamble) Keng f. – Tibet, Yunnan, Meghalaya, Myanmar
- Neomicrocalamus yunnanensis (T.H.Wen) Ohrnb. – Yunnan
