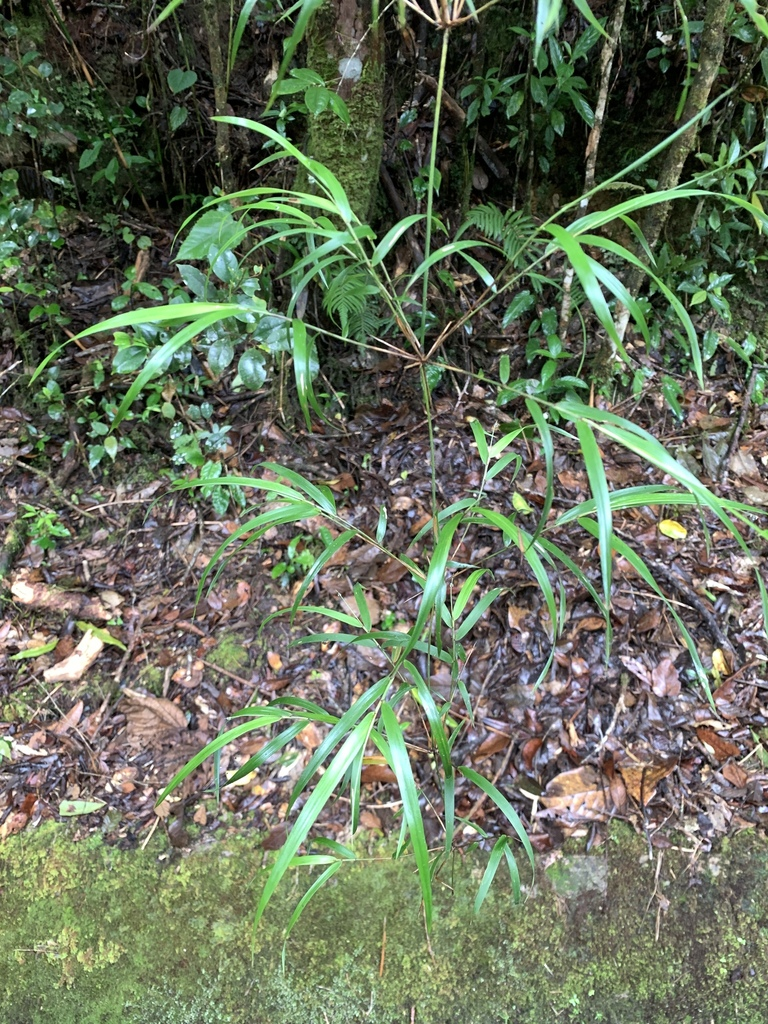

Scientific classification
- Kingdom: Plantae
- Clade: Tracheophytes
- Clade: Angiosperms
- Clade: Monocots
- Clade: Commelinids
- Order: Poales
- Family: Poaceae
- Subfamily: Bambusoideae
- Tribe: Bambuseae
- Subtribe: Racemobambosinae
- Genus: Racemobambos; Holttum

Type species
- Racemobambos gibbsiae (Stapf) Holttum

= Racemobambos =

Genus of grasses

Racemobambos is a genus of bamboo (tribe Bambuseae within the family Poaceae). The genus is native to Indonesia, Malaysia, and Papuasia.

Species

1. Racemobambos celebica
2. Racemobambos ceramica
3. Racemobambos congesta
4. Racemobambos gibbsiae
5. Racemobambos glabra
6. Racemobambos hepburnii
7. Racemobambos hirsuta
8. Racemobambos hirta
9. Racemobambos holttumii
10. Racemobambos kutaiensis
11. Racemobambos multiramosa
12. Racemobambos novohibernica
13. Racemobambos pairinii
14. Racemobambos raynalii
15. Racemobambos rigidifolia
16. Racemobambos rupicola
17. Racemobambos schultzei
18. Racemobambos sessilis
19. Racemobambos setifera
