= Melocalamus =

Scientific classification
- Kingdom: Plantae
- Clade: Tracheophytes
- Clade: Angiosperms
- Clade: Monocots
- Clade: Commelinids
- Order: Poales
- Family: Poaceae
- Subfamily: Bambusoideae
- Tribe: Bambuseae
- Subtribe: Bambusinae
- Genus: Melocalamus; Benth.

Genus of grasses

Melocalamus is a genus of Asian bamboos in the grass family. It is found in lowland areas of Southern China, Indochina, and the eastern part of the Indian subcontinent.

Species

1. Melocalamus arrectus T.P.Yi - Yunnan
2. Melocalamus blaoensis H.N.Nguyen & V.T.Tran - Vietnam
3. Melocalamus compactiflorus (Kurz) Benth. - Yunnan, Bangladesh, Assam, Bhutan, Arunachal Pradesh, Myanmar, Laos, Thailand, Vietnam
4. Melocalamus cucphuongensis H.N.Nguyen & V.T.Tran - Vietnam
5. Melocalamus elevatissimus Hsueh & T.P.Yi - Tibet
6. Melocalamus indicus R.B.Majumdar - Assam
7. Melocalamus kbangensis H.N.Nguyen & V.T.Tran - Vietnam
8. Melocalamus mastersii (Munro) R.B.Majumdar - Assam
9. Melocalamus ningmingensis Ohrnb. - Guangxi
10. Melocalamus pacoensis H.N.Nguyen & V.T.Tran - Vietnam
11. Melocalamus scandens Hsueh & C.M.Hui - Yunnan
12. Melocalamus truongsonensis H.N.Nguyen & V.T.Tran - Vietnam
13. Melocalamus yenbaiensis H.N.Nguyen & V.T.Tran - Vietnam

Formerly included

see Dinochloa

- Melocalamus macclellandii - Dinochloa macclellandii
