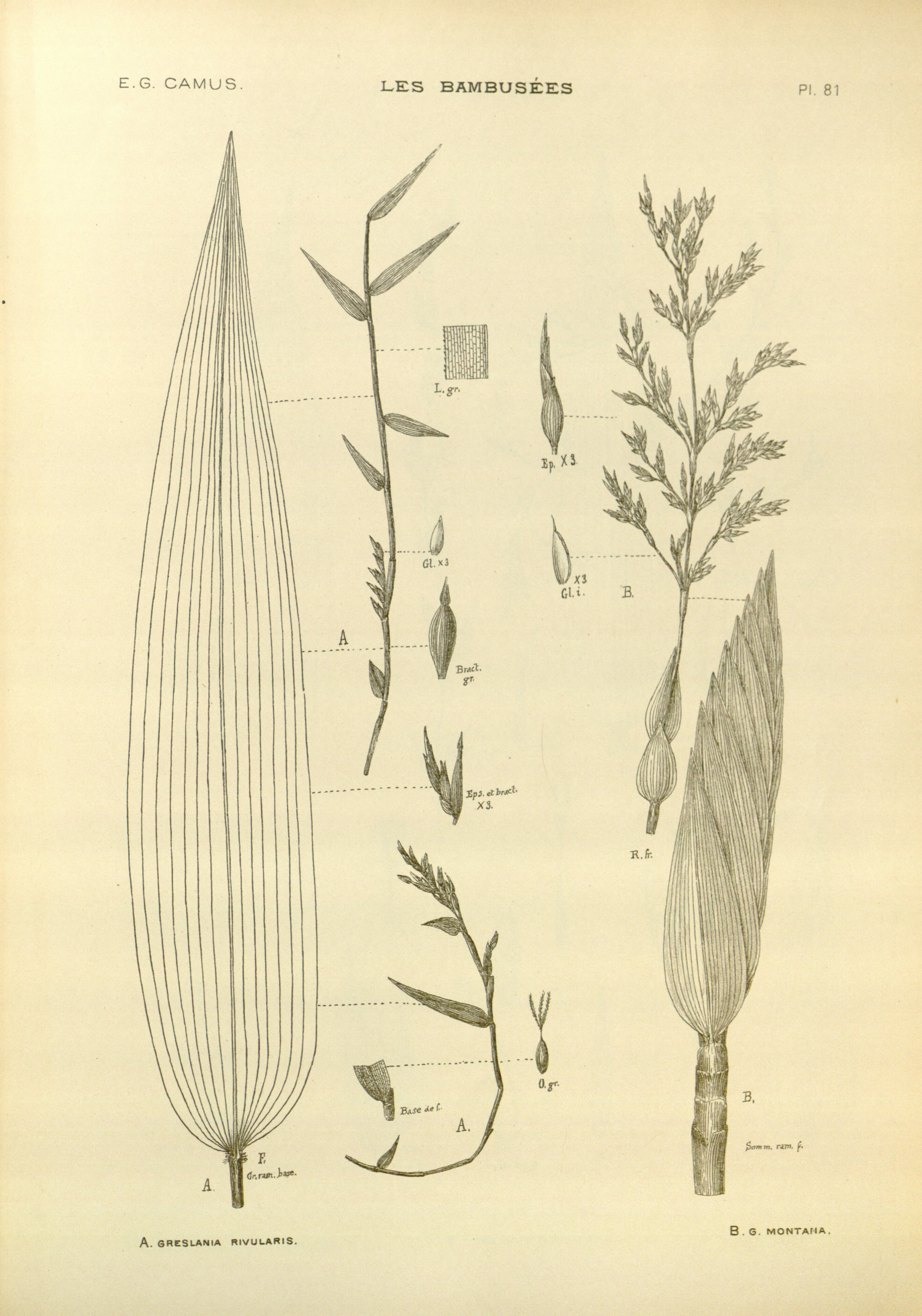
- Greslania rivularis on left, G. montana on right

Scientific classification
- Kingdom: Plantae
- Clade: Embryophytes
- Clade: Tracheophytes
- Clade: Angiosperms
- Clade: Monocots
- Clade: Commelinids
- Order: Poales
- Family: Poaceae
- Clade: BOP clade
- Subfamily: Bambusoideae
- Tribe: Bambuseae
- Subtribe: Greslaniinae
- Genus: Greslania; Balansa

Type species
- Greslania montana Balansa

= Greslania =

Species of plant

Greslania is a genus of small perennial bamboos in the grass family, endemic to New Caledonia. Two species are accepted.

== Description ==
Greslania species have woody culms emerging from short, clumping rhizomes. They generally lack lateral branches, instead growing clumps of erect culms reaching 60–350 cm (24–138 in) in height.

== Species ==
Two species are accepted.

- Greslania circinata Balansa
- Greslania rivularis Balansa
