= Yersinochloa =

Scientific classification
- Kingdom: Plantae
- Clade: Tracheophytes
- Clade: Angiosperms
- Clade: Monocots
- Clade: Commelinids
- Order: Poales
- Family: Poaceae
- Subfamily: Bambusoideae
- Tribe: Bambuseae
- Subtribe: Bambusinae
- Genus: Yersinochloa; H.N.Nguyen & V.T.Tran (2016)
- Species: Y. dalatensis

Binomial name
- Yersinochloa dalatensis H.N.Nguyen & V.T.Tran (2016)

Genus of flowering plants

Yersinochloa is a genus of flowering plants belonging to the family Poaceae. It contains a single species, Yersinochloa dalatensis. It is a bamboo endemic to Vietnam.
