= Heterixalus carbonei =

Conservation status
- Least Concern (IUCN 3.1)

Scientific classification
- Kingdom: Animalia
- Phylum: Chordata
- Class: Amphibia
- Order: Anura
- Family: Hyperoliidae
- Genus: Heterixalus
- Species: H. carbonei

Binomial name
- Heterixalus carbonei Vences, Glaw, Jesu & Schimmenti, 2000

Species of amphibian

Heterixalus carbonei is a species of frogs in the family Hyperoliidae endemic to Madagascar. Its natural habitats are subtropical or tropical dry forests, subtropical or tropical moist lowland forests, freshwater marshes, and intermittent freshwater marshes. It is threatened by habitat loss.
