= Cathariostachys =

Scientific classification
- Kingdom: Plantae
- Clade: Tracheophytes
- Clade: Angiosperms
- Clade: Monocots
- Clade: Commelinids
- Order: Poales
- Family: Poaceae
- Subfamily: Bambusoideae
- Tribe: Bambuseae
- Subtribe: Hickeliinae
- Genus: Cathariostachys; S.Dransf.

Type species
- Cathariostachys capitata (Kunth) S.Dransf.

Genus of grasses

Cathariostachys is a genus of Madagascan bamboo in the grass family.

Species

1. Cathariostachys capitata - eastern Madagascar
2. Cathariostachys madagascariensis (A.Camus) S.Dransf. - central Madagascar
