= Sokinochloa =

Scientific classification
- Kingdom: Plantae
- Clade: Tracheophytes
- Clade: Angiosperms
- Clade: Monocots
- Clade: Commelinids
- Order: Poales
- Family: Poaceae
- Genus: Sokinochloa; S.Dransf.

Genus of plants

Sokinochloa is a genus of flowering plants belonging to the subfamily Bambusoideae of the family Poaceae.

Its native range is Madagascar.

== Species ==
Species:

- Sokinochloa australis S.Dransf.
- Sokinochloa bosseri S.Dransf.
- Sokinochloa brachyclada S.Dransf.
- Sokinochloa chapelieri (Munro) S.Dransf.
- Sokinochloa chiataniae S.Dransf.
- Sokinochloa perrieri (A.Camus) S.Dransf.
- Sokinochloa viguieri (A.Camus) S.Dransf.
