= Parabambusa =

Scientific classification
- Kingdom: Plantae
- Clade: Tracheophytes
- Clade: Angiosperms
- Clade: Monocots
- Clade: Commelinids
- Order: Poales
- Family: Poaceae
- Genus: Parabambusa; Widjaja (1997)
- Species: P. kaini

Binomial name
- Parabambusa kaini Widjaja (1997)

Genus of plants

Parabambusa is a genus of flowering plants belonging to the family Poaceae. It contains a single species, Parabambusa kaini. It is a bamboo endemic to New Guinea.
