= Carmenza Cardona Londoño =

Colombian guerrilla fighter

- 'La Chiqui' during the 1980 Dominican Republic Embassy siege in Bogotá
- Nicknames: La Chiqui; Norma
- Born: 1953
- Died: March/April 1981 (aged 27–28)
- Allegiance: 19th of April Movement
- Actions: 1980 Dominican Republic Embassy siege in Bogotá

Carmenza Cardona Londoño aka La Chiqui (1953 – March/April, 1981) was a Colombian guerrilla fighter with the M-19.

== Siege of the Dominican Embassy ==
She participated in the 1980 Dominican Republic Embassy siege in Bogotá, as second in command, under the alias 'Norma'. She took part in early discussions with the Colombian Government along with one of the hostages, Mexican Ambassador Ricardo Galan.

== Death ==
There are conflicting reports about Londoño's death. Some newspapers at the time list her as a POW handed over to the Colombian Army by Ecuadorian authorities in March 1981, after clashes near the town of Mocoa, in which case she would have died as a prisoner of the Colombian Army. Other news sources say she was killed in combat against the Army in Colombia's Pacific coast region of Chocó in April 1981.
