= Maclurochloa =

Scientific classification
- Kingdom: Plantae
- Clade: Tracheophytes
- Clade: Angiosperms
- Clade: Monocots
- Clade: Commelinids
- Order: Poales
- Family: Poaceae
- Subfamily: Bambusoideae
- Tribe: Bambuseae
- Subtribe: Bambusinae
- Genus: Maclurochloa; K.M.Wong

Genus of bamboo

Maclurochloa is a genus of bamboo. It includes four species native to Peninsular Malaysia and Vietnam.

== Species ==
Four species are accepted.

- Maclurochloa locbacensis H.N.Nguyen & V.T.Tran
- Maclurochloa montana (Ridl.) K.M.Wong
- Maclurochloa tonkinensis H.N.Nguyen & V.T.Tran
- Maclurochloa trangdinhensis H.N.Nguyen & V.T.Tran
