= Juana Carolina Londoño =

Colombian politician (born 1977)

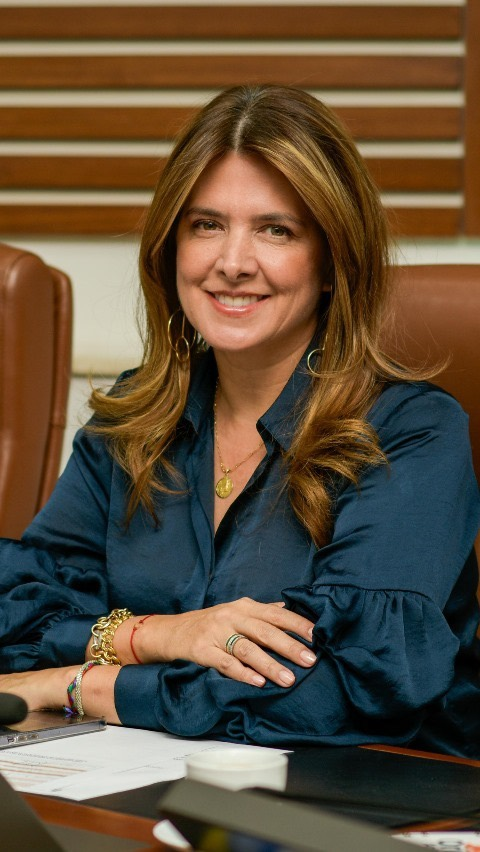
- Londoño in 2025

Member of the Chamber of Representatives
- Incumbent
- Assumed office 20 July 2022
- Constituency: Caldas
- In office 20 July 2010 – 19 July 2014
- Constituency: Caldas

Personal details
- Born: 20 July 1977 (age 48)
- Party: Colombian Conservative Party

Juana Carolina Londoño Jaramillo (born 20 July 1977) is a Colombian politician. She has been a member of the Chamber of Representatives since 2022, having previously served from 2010 to 2014. From 2014 to 2018, she served as president of Fiducoldex.
