= Widjajachloa =

Scientific classification
- Kingdom: Plantae
- Clade: Tracheophytes
- Clade: Angiosperms
- Clade: Monocots
- Clade: Commelinids
- Order: Poales
- Family: Poaceae
- Subfamily: Bambusoideae
- Tribe: Bambuseae
- Subtribe: Racemobambosinae
- Genus: Widjajachloa; K.M.Wong & S.Dransf.
- Species: W. producta

Binomial name
- Widjajachloa producta (Pilg.) K.M.Wong & S.Dransf.

Genus of flowering plants

Widjajachloa is a genus of flowering plants belonging to the family Poaceae. The only species is Widjajachloa producta.

Its native range is New Guinea.
