= Chloothamnus =

Scientific classification
- Kingdom: Plantae
- Clade: Tracheophytes
- Clade: Angiosperms
- Clade: Monocots
- Clade: Commelinids
- Order: Poales
- Family: Poaceae
- Clade: BOP clade
- Subfamily: Bambusoideae
- Tribe: Bambuseae
- Genus: Chloothamnus; Buse

Genus of bamboo

Chloothamnus is a genus of bamboo. It includes 11 species which range from Thailand and Vietnam to Sumatra, Java, and the Lesser Sunda Islands to New Guinea.

== Species ==
11 species are accepted.

- Chloothamnus elatoides (Widjaja) Widjaja
- Chloothamnus elatus (Holttum) Widjaja
- Chloothamnus elegantissimus (Hassk.) Henrard
- Chloothamnus glaucus (Widjaja) Widjaja
- Chloothamnus holttumianus (Bor) Widjaja
- Chloothamnus longispiculus (Holttum) Widjaja
- Chloothamnus obtusus (Holttum) Widjaja
- Chloothamnus reholttumianus (Soenarko) Widjaja
- Chloothamnus rudimentifer (Holttum) Widjaja
- Chloothamnus schlechteri (Pilg.) Henrard
- Chloothamnus schmutzii (S.Dransf.) Widjaja
