= Nianhochloa =

Scientific classification
- Kingdom: Plantae
- Clade: Tracheophytes
- Clade: Angiosperms
- Clade: Monocots
- Clade: Commelinids
- Order: Poales
- Family: Poaceae
- Genus: Nianhochloa; H.N.Nguyen & V.T.Tran
- Species: N. bidoupensis

Binomial name
- Nianhochloa bidoupensis H.N.Nguyen & V.T.Tran

Genus of plants

Nianhochloa is a genus of bamboo belonging to the family Poaceae. It includes a single species, Nianhochloa bidoupensis, which is endemic to Vietnam.
