= Hickelia =

Scientific classification
- Kingdom: Plantae
- Clade: Tracheophytes
- Clade: Angiosperms
- Clade: Monocots
- Clade: Commelinids
- Order: Poales
- Family: Poaceae
- Subfamily: Bambusoideae
- Tribe: Bambuseae
- Subtribe: Hickeliinae
- Genus: Hickelia; A.Camus

Type species
- Hickelia madagascariensis A.Camus

Synonyms
- Pseudocoix A.Camus

Genus of grasses

Hickelia is a genus of African bamboo in the grass family.

Species

1. Hickelia africana S.Dransf. - Tanzania
2. Hickelia alaotrensis A.Camus - Madagascar
3. Hickelia madagascariensis A.Camus - Madagascar
4. Hickelia perrieri (A.Camus) S.Dransf. - Madagascar
