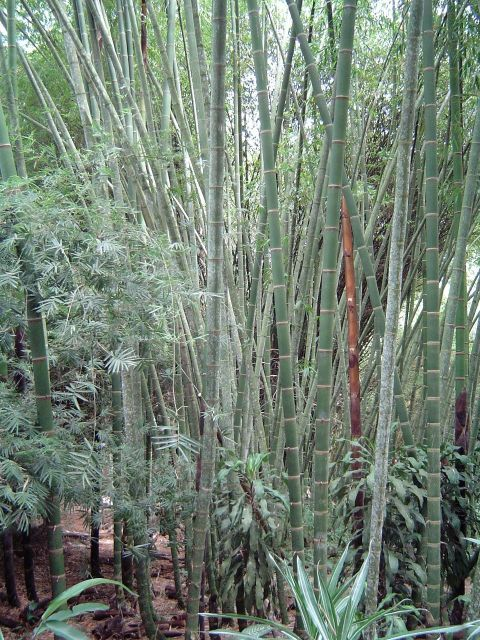
- Guadua angustifolia

Scientific classification
- Kingdom: Plantae
- Clade: Tracheophytes
- Clade: Angiosperms
- Clade: Monocots
- Clade: Commelinids
- Order: Poales
- Family: Poaceae
- Clade: BOP clade
- Subfamily: Bambusoideae
- Tribe: Bambuseae
- Subtribe: Guaduinae; Soderstr. & R.P.Ellis

Genera
- Apoclada; Eremocaulon; Guadua; Olmeca; Otatea

= Guaduinae =

Subtribe of grasses

The Guaduinae is a subtribe of bamboo (tribe Bambuseae of the family Poaceae). It comprises 5 recognized genera.
