= Óscar Londoño =

Colombian footballer (born 1979)

Personal information
- Full name: Óscar Darío Londoño Montoya
- Date of birth: 7 March 1979 (age 47)
- Place of birth: Medellín, Colombia
- Height: 1.71 m (5 ft 7 in)
- Position: Forward

Senior career*
Years	Team	Apps	(Gls)
1999–2000	Atlético Nacional	12	(0)
2001–2003	Cortuluá	68	(17)
2003	Santa Fe	9	(0)
2004	Cortuluá	4	(0)
2004	Atlético Huila	4	(0)
2005	Atlético Bucaramanga	23	(3)
2006–2007	La Equidad	51	(18)
2008	Bogotá		
2009–2010	Itagüí		
2010	Árabe Unido	12	(2)
2011–2012	Academia	35	(18)
2012–2013	Fortaleza	47	(11)
- * Club domestic league appearances and goals as of June 20, 2012 ‡ National team caps and goals as of June 20, 2012

Óscar Darío Londoño Montoya (born 3 March 1979) is a retired Colombian football forward.

== Career ==
Born in Medellín, Londoño began playing football with Atlético Nacional in Colombia's Categoría Primera A. He has also played for Categoría Primera A sides Cortuluá, Santa Fe, Atlético Huila and Atlético Bucaramanga, and had a brief spell in Panama with Árabe Unido.

== Titles ==
Season	Club	Title
1999	Atlético Nacional	Categoría Primera A
2010	Itagüí Ditaires	Categoría Primera B
