= Cyrtochloa =

Scientific classification
- Kingdom: Plantae
- Clade: Tracheophytes
- Clade: Angiosperms
- Clade: Monocots
- Clade: Commelinids
- Order: Poales
- Family: Poaceae
- Subfamily: Bambusoideae
- Tribe: Bambuseae
- Subtribe: Dinochloinae
- Genus: Cyrtochloa; S.Dransf.

Type species
- Cyrtochloa toppingii (Gamble) J.Dransf.

Genus of grasses

Cyrtochloa is a genus of Philippine bamboo in the grass family.

== Species ==
1. Cyrtochloa fenixii (Gamble) J.Dransf. - Luzon
2. Cyrtochloa hirsuta J.Dransf. - Luzon
3. Cyrtochloa luzonica (Gamble) J.Dransf. - Luzon
4. Cyrtochloa major (Pilg.) J.Dransf. - Luzon
5. Cyrtochloa mindoroensis J.Dransf. - Mindoro
6. Cyrtochloa puser J.Dransf. - Luzon
7. Cyrtochloa toppingii (Gamble) J.Dransf. - Luzon
