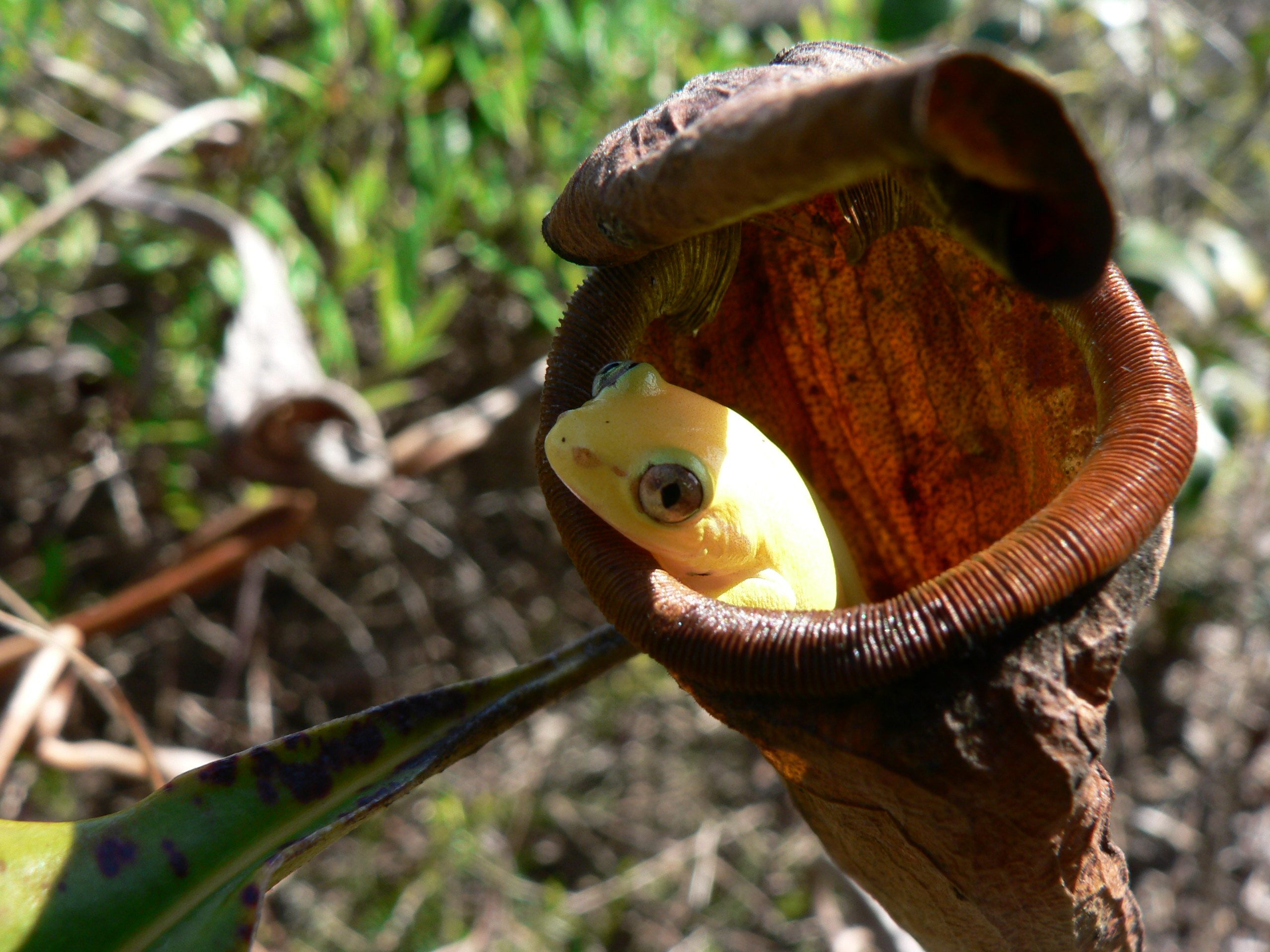
- Heterixalus boettgeri in a dried upper pitcher of Nepenthes madagascariensis

Conservation status
- Least Concern (IUCN 3.1)

Scientific classification
- Kingdom: Animalia
- Phylum: Chordata
- Class: Amphibia
- Order: Anura
- Family: Hyperoliidae
- Genus: Heterixalus
- Species: H. boettgeri

Binomial name
- Heterixalus boettgeri (Mocquard, 1902)

Synonyms
- Megalixalus boettgeri Mocquard, 1902; Megalixalus mocquardi Boettger, 1913; Heterixalus mocquardi (Boettger, 1913)

= Heterixalus boettgeri =

Species of frog

Heterixalus boettgeri is a species of frog in the family Hyperoliidae. It is endemic to Madagascar and occurs in the extreme southeastern and southern parts of the island. The specific name boettgeri honours Oskar Boettger, a German zoologist. Common name Boettger's reed frog has been coined for it.

== Description ==
Adult males measure 22–25 mm (0.87–0.98 in) and adult females 27–29 mm (1.1–1.1 in) or even 32 mm (1.3 in) in snout–vent length. The tympanum is distinct but small (¼ of the eye diameter). The dorsum is uniformly greenish, or more yellowish in males. Juveniles have light dorsolateral bands that are not present in adults. The thighs, ventral surface of limbs, hands, and feet are orange. The venter is creamish.

The tadpoles grow to at least 37 mm (1.5 in) in total length (Gosner stage 40), of which the body makes up about one third.

== Habitat and conservation ==
This species occurs in a range of habitats at elevations below 300 m (980 ft) asl: dry forests, rainforest edges, littoral forests immediately behind sand dunes, deforested areas, croplands, as well as villages and urban areas. Males call after rainfall at night in sun-exposed swamps and rice-fields. It is a locally common and adaptable species that is unlikely to face major threats. It is found in low number in the international pet trade. It occurs in some protected areas (Cape Sainte Marie Special Reserve, Mandena Classified Forest), possibly including the Andohahela National Park.
