= Fimbribambusa =

Scientific classification
- Kingdom: Plantae
- Clade: Tracheophytes
- Clade: Angiosperms
- Clade: Monocots
- Clade: Commelinids
- Order: Poales
- Family: Poaceae
- Clade: BOP clade
- Subfamily: Bambusoideae
- Genus: Fimbribambusa; Widjaja

Genus of bamboo

Fimbribambusa is a genus of bamboo. It includes four species native to Malesia (Java, Lesser Sunda Islands, Philippines, and Sulawesi) and New Guinea.

== Species ==
Four species are accepted.

- Fimbribambusa horsfieldii (Munro) Widjaja
- Fimbribambusa microcephala (Pilg.) Widjaja
- Fimbribambusa rifaiana Widjaja
- Fimbribambusa soejatmiae Widjaja & Ervianti
