= Daniel Londoño (economist) =

Colombian economist and academic

Daniel Mejia Londoño

Academic background
- Education: Brown University

Academic work
- Discipline: Economics

Dr. Daniel Mejia Londoño is a Colombian economist and academic. He was formerly the director for the Center for Studies on Safety and Drugs at the University of Los Andes, and former Secretary of Security for Bogotá, Colombia. He is one of the leading scholars in drug research in the world, particularly the impact of cocaine trade on third world countries. He currently teaches economics of Crime at Universidad de Los Andes. In 2015 he was one of 39 academics who lobbied the government against the use of glyphosates.
