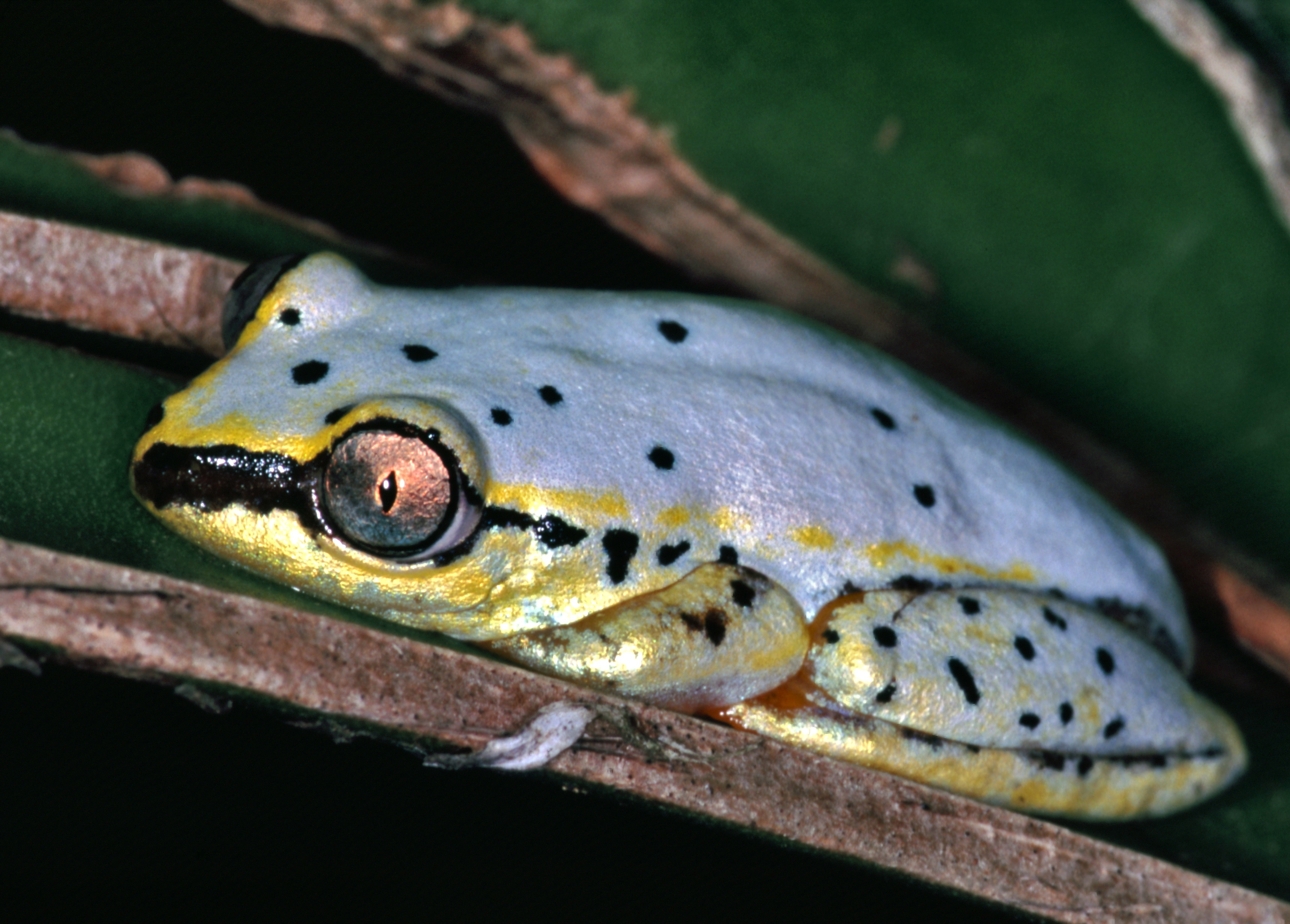

Conservation status
- Least Concern (IUCN 3.1)

Scientific classification
- Kingdom: Animalia
- Phylum: Chordata
- Class: Amphibia
- Order: Anura
- Family: Hyperoliidae
- Genus: Heterixalus
- Species: H. madagascariensis

Binomial name
- Heterixalus madagascariensis (Duméril & Bibron, 1841)

Synonyms
- Eucnemis antanosi Grandidier, 1872; Eucnemis madagascariensis Duméril & Bibron, 1841; Hyperolius arnoulti Guibé, 1975; Hyperolius madagascariensis (Duméril & Bibron, 1841); Rappia antanosi (Grandidier, 1872)

= Heterixalus madagascariensis =

Species of frog

Heterixalus madagascariensis (commonly referred to as the blue-back reed frog, or occasionally the powder-blue reed frog) is a species of frog in the family Hyperoliidae endemic to Madagascar. Its natural habitats are subtropical or tropical dry forests, subtropical or tropical moist lowland forests, moist savanna, subtropical or tropical seasonally wet or flooded lowland grassland, swamps, freshwater marshes, intermittent freshwater marshes, sandy shores, arable land, urban areas, heavily degraded former forests, ponds, irrigated land, and seasonally flooded agricultural land.

It is a popular choice of amphibian in the pet trade because of its beautiful colors and ease of care in a proper setup.
