= Phuphanochloa =

Scientific classification
- Kingdom: Plantae
- Clade: Tracheophytes
- Clade: Angiosperms
- Clade: Monocots
- Clade: Commelinids
- Order: Poales
- Family: Poaceae
- Genus: Phuphanochloa; Sungkaew & Teerawat.
- Species: P. speciosa

Binomial name
- Phuphanochloa speciosa Sungkaew & Teerawat.

Synonyms
- Bambusa speciosa (Sungkaew & Teerawat.) D.L.Fu

Genus of plants

Phuphanochloa is a genus of flowering plants belonging to the family Poaceae. It contains a single species, Phuphanochloa speciosa, a bamboo endemic to Thailand.
