= Soejatmi Dransfield =

Botanist

- Born: Indonesia
- Citizenship: British
- Known for: Botany; Taxonomy
- Spouse: John Dransfield
- Scientific career
- Fields: Botany
- Author abbrev. (botany): S.Dransf.

Soejatmi Dransfield (born 1939) is an Indonesia-born British plant taxonomist specializing in bamboos and currently honorary research fellow at the Royal Botanic Gardens, Kew, UK.

== Early life ==
Soejatmi Soenarko was born in Nganjuk, Indonesia in 1939.

== Education ==
Dransfield got her first degree in Plant Taxonomy from the Academy of Agriculture, Ciawi, Bogor in Indonesia. In 1975, she got her PhD in biology from the University of Reading in the UK, her thesis entitled Revision of Cymbopogon (Gramineae).

== Career ==
Dransfield began her career as a staff member of Herbarium Bogoriense, Bogor in Indonesia. After completing her PhD, she went back to working at Bogor and continued working on bamboos. She moved to the UK in 1978 to continue her research on bamboo taxonomy including the generic delimitation of the Old World tropical bamboos. She writes on the account of bamboos from Malaysia, Thailand and Madagascar.

Her appointment as an honorary research fellow at the Royal Botanic Garden was a recognition of her work on the bamboos. Together with her husband John Dransfield, she traveled to South East Asia and Madagascar. They presented their research on bamboos at the Plant Resources of South East Asia meeting in Jakarta.

Dransfield's efforts resulted in the identification and description of forty two erect bamboo species. In 1993 and 1994, Dransfield collected specimens of Schizostachyum and Dinochloa from Luzon in Philippines which she used to study, revise and publish articles. This was a three-year project on bamboos “Field guide for the identification of erect bamboos grown in the Philippines and helped collect materials for taxonomy and updated nomenclature.

At the Kew Herbarium, her primary research is on the paleotropical bamboos. Along with a team of other botanists, Dransfield has worked to identify sixty species of bamboos by carefully studying the bamboo trunks, leaves, and shoots through a software program written by French professor Regine Vignes Lebbe. The bamboo genus Soejatmia from Malaya and Thailand, has been named after her.

She married Dr John Dransfield in Malaysia (1977).

== Selected publications ==
- A New Species and a New Combination of Cyrtochloa
- Sirochloa, a New Bamboo Genus from Madagascar (Poaceae-Bambusoideae)
- Cyrtochloa, a New Genus of Bamboo (Gramineae-Bambusoideae) from the Philippines
- Valiha and Cathariostachys, Two New Bamboo Genera (Gramineae-Bambusoideae) from Madagascar
- Notes on Bambusa diffusa (Gramineae-Bambusoideae) from Luzon, Philippines

== Books ==
- The Bamboos of Sabah
- Plant Resources of South-East Asia: Bamboos. no 7
