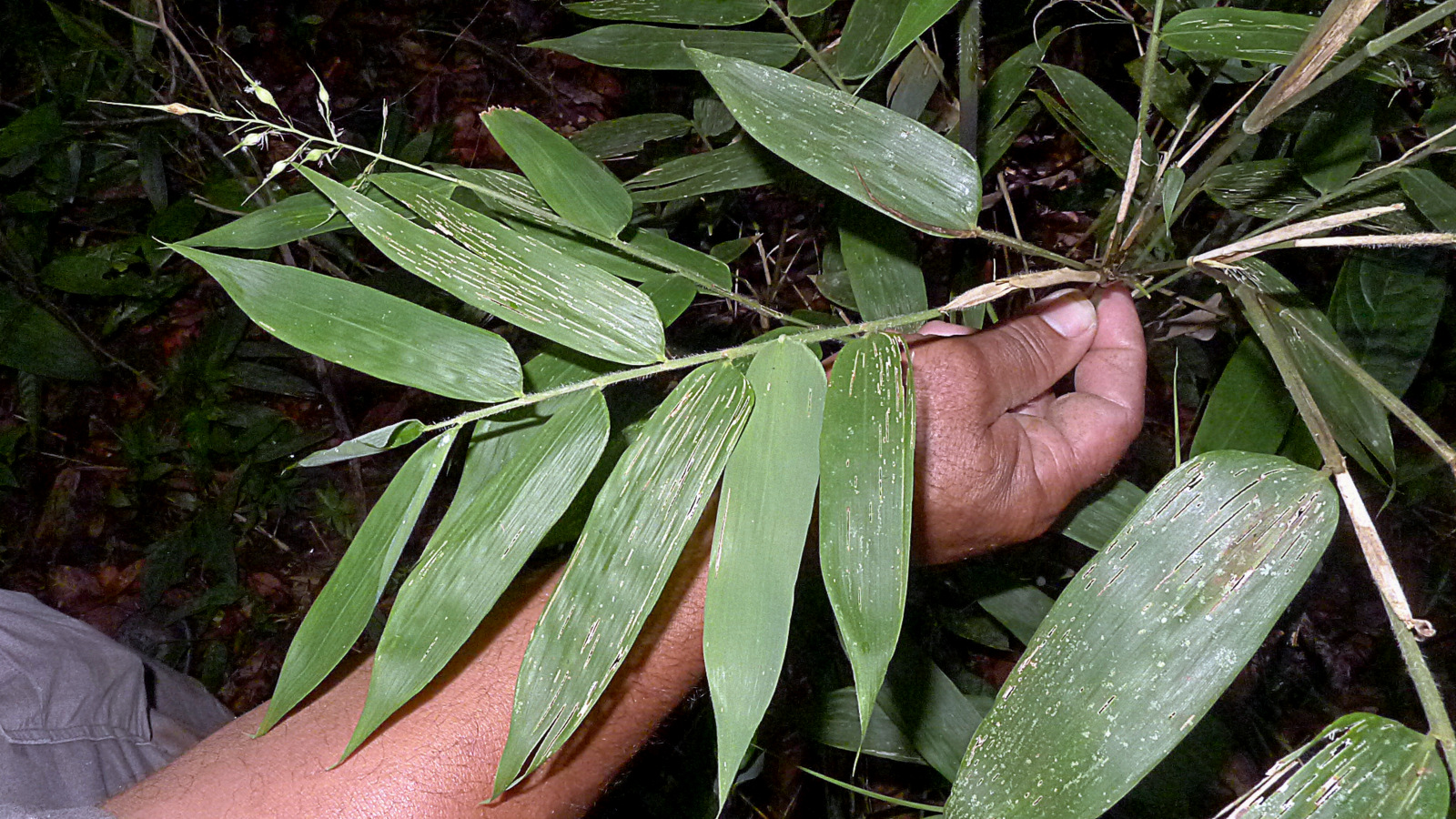
- Olyra latifolia

Scientific classification
- Kingdom: Plantae
- Clade: Tracheophytes
- Clade: Angiosperms
- Clade: Monocots
- Clade: Commelinids
- Order: Poales
- Family: Poaceae
- Subfamily: Bambusoideae
- Tribe: Olyreae
- Subtribe: Olyrinae
- Genus: Olyra; L.

Type species
- Olyra latifolia L.

Synonyms
- Mapira Adans.

= Olyra (plant) =

Genus of grasses

Olyra is a genus of tropical bamboos in the grass family. It is native primarily to the Western Hemisphere, with one species extending into Africa.

== Species ==
- Olyra amapana Soderstr. & Zuloaga - Brazil(Amapá, Rondônia, Amazonas), Venezuela (Amazonas))
- Olyra bahiensis R.P.Oliveira & Longhi-Wagner - Bahia
- Olyra buchtienii Hack. - Peru, Bolivia
- Olyra caudata Trin. - Trinidad and Tobago, Costa Rica, Panama, Colombia, Venezuela, Guyana, Suriname, French Guiana, Brazil, Bolivia, Peru, Ecuador
- Olyra ciliatifolia Raddi - Trinidad and Tobago, Colombia, Venezuela, Guyana, Suriname, French Guiana, Brazil, Bolivia, Paraguay, Argentina (Misiones, Corrientes)
- Olyra davidseana Judz. & Zuloaga - Brazil (Pará, Amazonas)
- Olyra ecaudata Döll - Nicaragua, Costa Rica, Panama, Colombia, Venezuela, Guyana, Suriname, French Guiana, Brazil, Bolivia, Peru, Ecuador
- Olyra fasciculata Trin. - Brazil, Peru, Bolivia, Paraguay, Argentina (Tucumán, Salta, Jujuy, Misiones)
- Olyra filiformis Trin. - Bahia
- Olyra glaberrima Raddi - Mexico, Central America, Peru, Brazil, Paraguay
- Olyra holttumiana Soderstr. & Zuloaga - Panama
- Olyra humilis Nees - Brazil, Paraguay, Argentina (Misiones, Corrientes)
- Olyra juruana Mez - Brazil (Pará, Amazonas), Peru (Loreto, Cusco, Pasco)
- Olyra latifolia L. - tropical Africa (Senegal to Zimbabwe), Comoros, Madagascar, Americas (Mexico to Paraguay + West Indies)
- Olyra latispicula Soderstr. & Zuloaga - Bahia
- Olyra longifolia Kunth - tropical South America
- Olyra loretensis Mez - Bolivia, Colombia, Peru, Brazil
- Olyra maranonensis Swallen - Peru
- Olyra obliquifolia Steud. - Suriname, French Guiana, Brazil (Amapá, Pará, Maranhão)
- Olyra retrorsa Soderstr. & Zuloaga - Mato Grosso
- Olyra standleyi Hitchc. - Costa Rica, Panama, Venezuela, Colombia
- Olyra tamanquareana Soderstr. & Zuloaga - Brazil (Amazonas)
- Olyra taquara Swallen - Brazil (Goiás, Mato Grosso, Mato Grosso do Sul, Minas Gerais, D.F., Pará)
- Olyra wurdackii Swallen - Venezuela (Amazonas), Brazil (Amazonas)

== Formerly included ==
see Agnesia Arberella Cryptochloa Ichnanthus Lithachne Parodiolyra Piresia Piresiella Raddia Raddiella Sucrea

- Olyra axillaris - Lithachne pauciflora
- Olyra blanchetii - Parodiolyra ramosissima
- Olyra brasiliensis (Bertol.) Spreng. 1827 not Desv. 1831 - Raddia brasiliensis
- Olyra capillata - Cryptochloa capillata
- Olyra concinna - Cryptochloa concinna
- Olyra flaccida - Arberella flaccida
- Olyra floribunda - Raddia brasiliensis
- Olyra hoehnei - Raddia brasiliensis
- Olyra lancifolia - Agnesia lancifolia
- Olyra lateralis - Parodiolyra lateralis
- Olyra luetzelburgii - Parodiolyra luetzelburgii
- Olyra malmeana - Raddiella malmeana
- Olyra micrantha - Parodiolyra micrantha
- Olyra nana - Raddiella esenbeckii
- Olyra ovata - Ichnanthus panicoides
- Olyra pauciflora - Lithachne pauciflora
- Olyra pinetii - Lithachne pinetii
- Olyra podachne - Cryptochloa capillata
- Olyra polypodioides - Raddia distichophylla
- Olyra ramosissima - Parodiolyra ramosissima
- Olyra sampaiana - Sucrea sampaiana
- Olyra sarmentosa - Parodiolyra lateralis
- Olyra strephioides - Piresiella strephioides
- Olyra strictiflora - Cryptochloa strictiflora
- Olyra sympodica - Piresia sympodica
- Olyra urbaniana - Raddia guianensis
