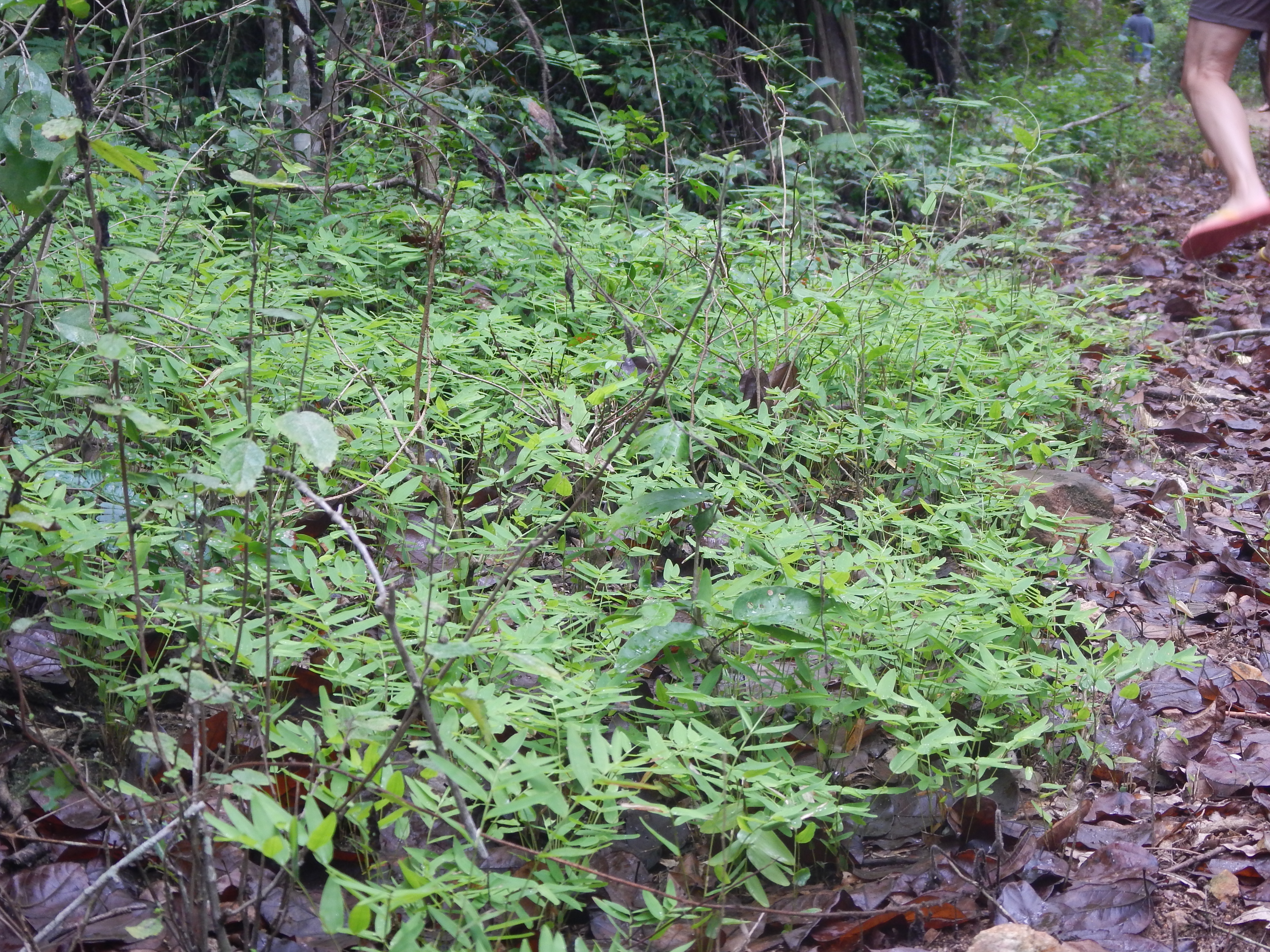

Scientific classification
- Kingdom: Plantae
- Clade: Tracheophytes
- Clade: Angiosperms
- Clade: Monocots
- Clade: Commelinids
- Order: Poales
- Family: Poaceae
- Subfamily: Bambusoideae
- Tribe: Olyreae
- Subtribe: Olyrinae
- Genus: Raddia; Bertol. 1819 not DC. 1824 nor Mazziari 1834

Type species
- Raddia brasiliensis Bertol.

Synonyms
- Strephium Schrad. ex Nees

= Raddia =

Genus of grasses

Raddia is a genus of South American plants in the grass family, most of the species found only in Brazil.

The genus was named for Italian botanist and herpetologist Giuseppe Raddi, 1770–1829.

Species

1. Raddia angustifolia Soderstr. & Zuloaga - Bahia
2. Raddia brasiliensis Bertol. - Rio de Janeiro, Bahia, Espírito Santo, Mato Grosso, Paraíba
3. Raddia distichophylla (Steud. ex Nees) Chase - Bahia
4. Raddia guianensis (Brongn.) C.L.Hitchc. - Trinidad and Tobago, Pará, French Guiana, Suriname, Venezuela (Carabobo, Yaracuy)
5. Raddia lancifolia R.P.Oliveira & Longhi-Wagner - Espírito Santo
6. Raddia megaphylla R.P.Oliveira & Longhi-Wagner - Espírito Santo, Bahia
7. Raddia portoi Kuhlm. - Bahia
8. Raddia soderstromii R.P.Oliveira, L.G.Clark & Judz. - Bahia, Rio Grande do Norte, Rio de Janeiro, Sergipe
9. Raddia stolonifera R.P.Oliveira & Longhi-Wagner - Bahia

formerly included

see Arberella Crypsis Cryptochloa Piresia Raddiella

- Raddia aculeata - Crypsis aculeata
- Raddia biformis - Piresia sympodica
- Raddia capillata - Cryptochloa capillata
- Raddia concinna - Cryptochloa concinna
- Raddia costaricensis - Arberella costaricensis
- Raddia malmeana - Raddiella malmeana
- Raddia nana - Raddiella esenbeckii
- Raddia strictiflora - Cryptochloa strictiflora
- Raddia sympodica - Piresia sympodica
