= M. tecta =

M. tecta may refer to:

- Mola tecta, a fish species
- Megachile tecta, a bee species
- Maclurolyra tecta, a grass species
