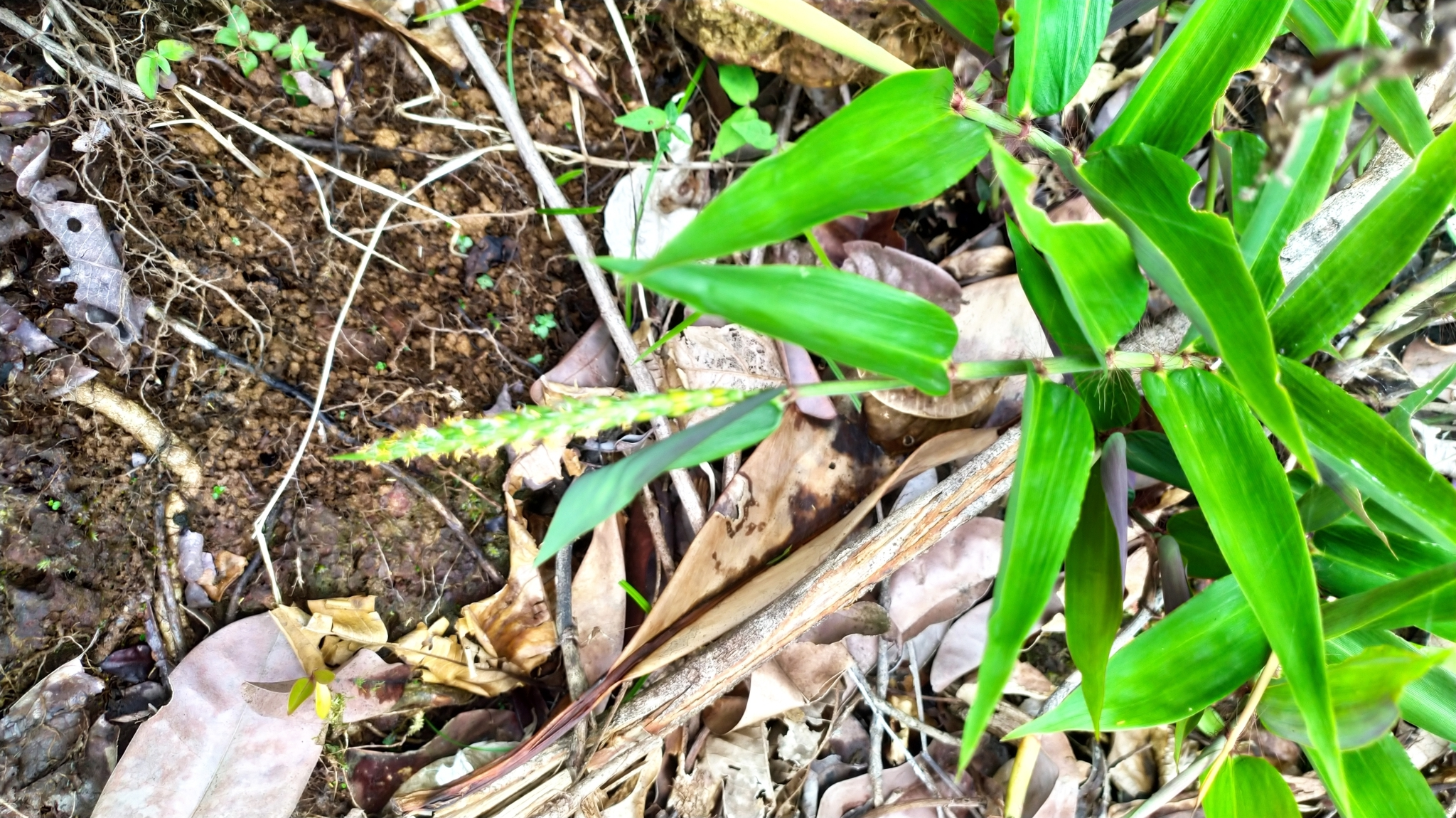
- P. campestris

Scientific classification
- Kingdom: Plantae
- Clade: Tracheophytes
- Clade: Angiosperms
- Clade: Monocots
- Clade: Commelinids
- Order: Poales
- Family: Poaceae
- Subfamily: Bambusoideae
- Tribe: Olyreae
- Subtribe: Parianinae
- Genus: Pariana; Aubl.

Type species
- Pariana campestris Aubl.

= Pariana =

Genus of grasses

Pariana is a genus of flowering plants in the grass family. It is native to tropical Central and South America.

== Species ==
The genus includes the following species:

- Pariana argentea
- Pariana aurita
- Pariana bicolor
- Pariana campestris
- Pariana carvalhoi
- Pariana concinna
- Pariana distans
- Pariana ecuadorensis
- Pariana gracilis
- Pariana lanceolata
- Pariana ligulata
- Pariana maynensis
- Pariana modesta
- Pariana nervata
- Pariana obtusa
- Pariana ovalifolia
- Pariana pallida
- Pariana parvispica
- Pariana radiciflora
- Pariana setosa
- Pariana simulans
- Pariana sociata
- Pariana strigosa
- Pariana swallenii
- Pariana tenuis
- Pariana trichosticha
- Pariana ulei
- Pariana velutina
- Pariana zingiberina

formerly included

see Eremitis Steyermarkochloa

- Pariana angustifolia - Steyermarkochloa angustifolia
- Pariana microstachya - Eremitis parviflora
- Pariana monothalamia - Eremitis parviflora
- Pariana parviflora - Eremitis parviflora
