= Mniochloa =

Scientific classification
- Kingdom: Plantae
- Clade: Tracheophytes
- Clade: Angiosperms
- Clade: Monocots
- Clade: Commelinids
- Order: Poales
- Family: Poaceae
- Subfamily: Bambusoideae
- Tribe: Olyreae
- Subtribe: Olyrinae
- Genus: Mniochloa; Chase
- Species: M. pulchella

Binomial name
- Mniochloa pulchella (Griseb.) Chase

Synonyms
- Digitaria pulchella Griseb.; Strephium pulchellum (Griseb.) C.Wright

Genus of grasses

Mniochloa is a genus of Cuban plants in the grass family. The only known species is Mniochloa pulchella, native to eastern Cuba near Guantánamo.

formerly included

see Piresiella

- Mniochloa strephioides – Piresiella strephioides
