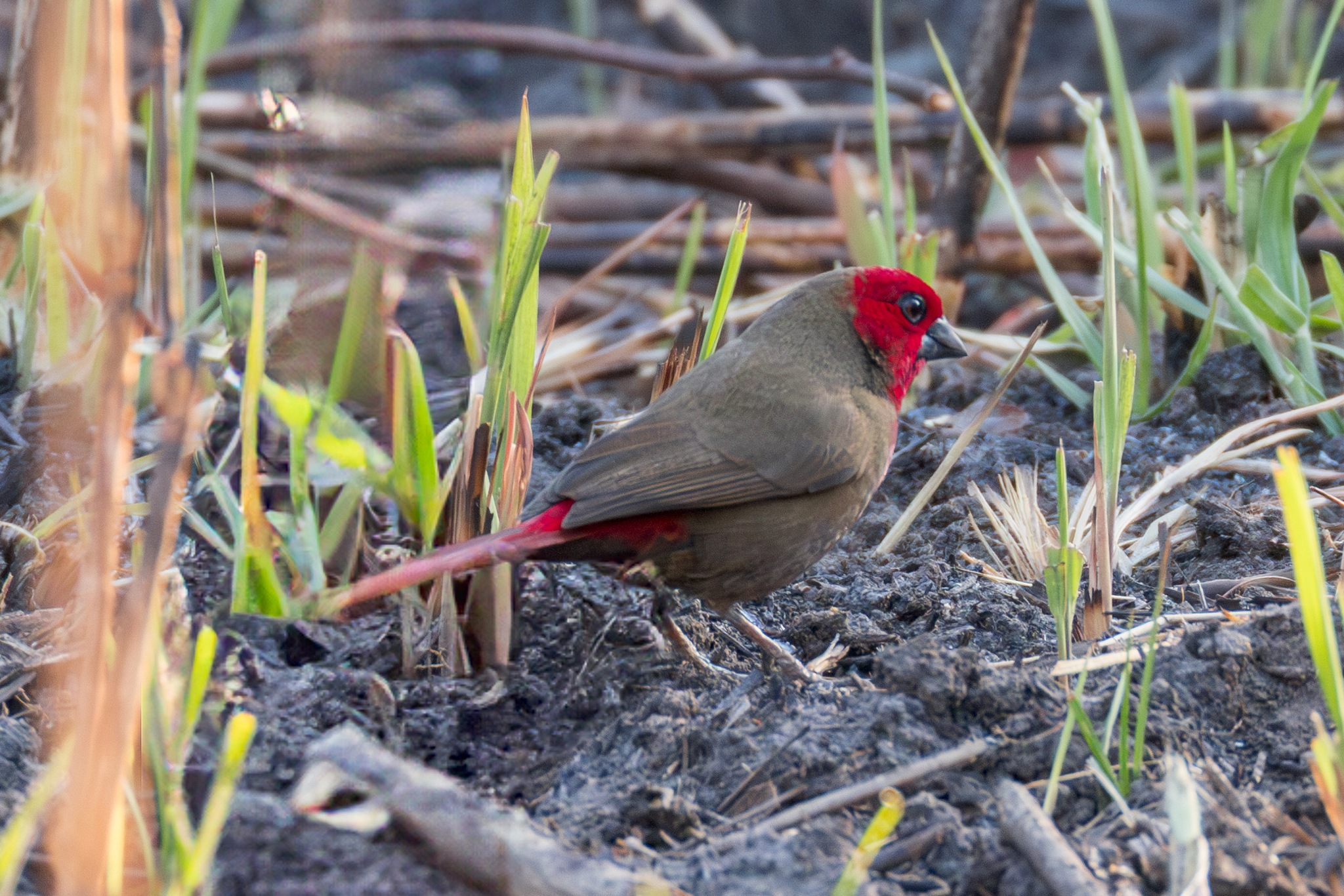

Conservation status
- Least Concern (IUCN 3.1)

Scientific classification
- Kingdom: Animalia
- Phylum: Chordata
- Class: Aves
- Order: Passeriformes
- Family: Estrildidae
- Genus: Pyrenestes
- Species: P. minor

Binomial name
- Pyrenestes minor Shelley, 1894

= Lesser seedcracker =

Species of bird

The lesser seedcracker or Nyasa seedcracker (Pyrenestes minor) is a fairly common species of estrildid finch found in eastern Africa. It has an estimated global extent of occurrence of 925,000 km^{2} (357,000 mi^{2}) and is found in Malawi, Mozambique, Tanzania and Zimbabwe. The International Union for Conservation of Nature has classified the species as being of least concern.

== Description ==
The lesser seedcracker grows to a length of about 14 cm (5.5 in). The male plumage is brown tinged with olive, apart from the forehead, crown, side of face, chin, throat and upper breast which are bright red, and the rump and central tail feathers which are deep blood red. The underparts are paler than the upper parts. The female is similar but has a smaller area of red on the face and crown. The short, broad beak is black, the brown eye is surrounded by a white eye ring, and the legs are greyish-brown or dark grey. The juvenile is similar to the adults but the colours are more muted. This species could be confused with the black-bellied seedcracker but the two species do not share a common range.

== Distribution and habitat ==
This is a resident but somewhat uncommon species and occurs in southern Tanzania, eastern Zimbabwe, southern Malawi and northern Mozambique. It is found in upland forests, at altitudes of between 725 and 1,800 m (2,400 and 5,900 ft), both in high rainfall areas and in forest margins in drier areas, in Brachystegia woodland, clearings, scrubby areas and areas of rank vegetation, often near watercourses.

== Behaviour ==
The lesser seedcracker is a mostly resident species, but is a partial migrant in eastern Zimbabwe. It usually forages in pairs low in the undergrowth, or sometimes on the ground, feeding on grass and other seeds, including rice and the large hard seeds of the bamboo Olyra latifolia. Breeding takes place between December and March in Malawi and Zimbabwe, and between March and May in Mozambique.

== Status ==
The lesser seedcracker has a very wide range. It faces no particular threats and the population is stable, so the International Union for Conservation of Nature has assessed its conservation status as being of "least concern".
