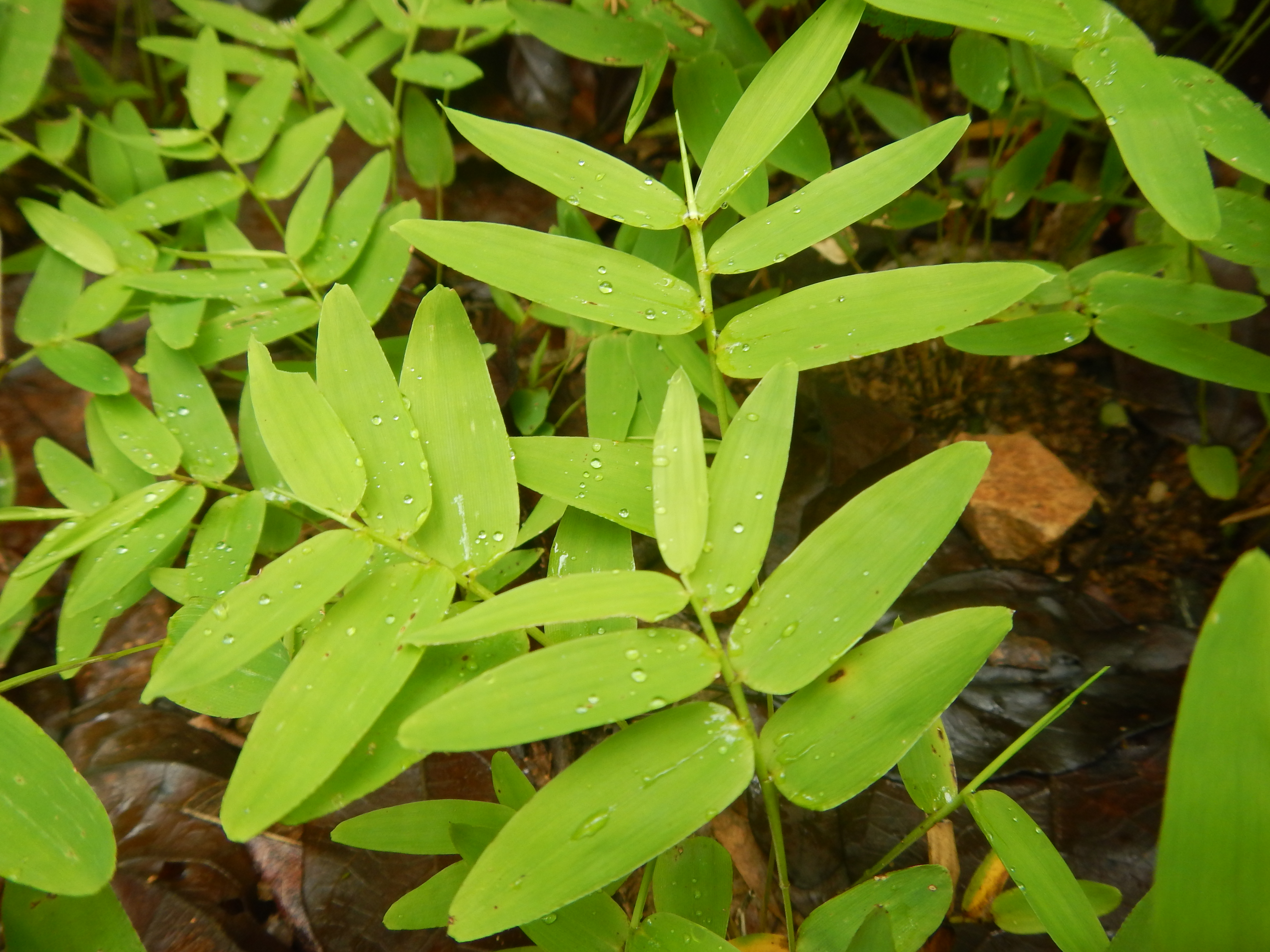
- Raddia brasiliensis

Scientific classification
- Kingdom: Plantae
- Clade: Tracheophytes
- Clade: Angiosperms
- Clade: Monocots
- Clade: Commelinids
- Order: Poales
- Family: Poaceae
- Clade: BOP clade
- Subfamily: Bambusoideae
- Tribe: Olyreae; Kunth ex Spenn.

Genera
- 21 genera, see text

Synonyms
- supertribe Olyrodae L. Liu (1980); tribe Buergersiochloeae S.T. Blake (1946); tribe Parianeae C.E. Hubb. (1934)

= Olyreae =

Tribe of grasses

Olyreae is a tribe of grasses in the bamboo subfamily (Bambusoideae). Unlike the other two bamboo tribes, Olyreae are herbaceous and do not have a woody stem. Their sister group are the tropical woody bamboos (Bambuseae).

Olyreae grow in the understorey of humid tropical forests. They are mainly distributed in the Neotropics around the Amazon Basin but there is also one species from Africa, Olyra latifolia, and one from New Guinea, Buergersiochloa bambusoides.

The tribe is divided into three subtribes with 21 genera:

Buergersiochloinae
- Buergersiochloa
Olyrinae
- Agnesia
- Arberella
- Brasilochloa
- Cryptochloa
- Diandrolyra
- Ekmanochloa
- Froesiochloa
- Lithachne
- Maclurolyra
- Mniochloa
- Olyra
- Parodiolyra
- Piresiella
- Raddia
- Raddiella
- Rehia
- Reitzia (syn. Piresia)
- Sucrea
- Taquara
Parianinae
- Eremitis
- Pariana
- Parianella
