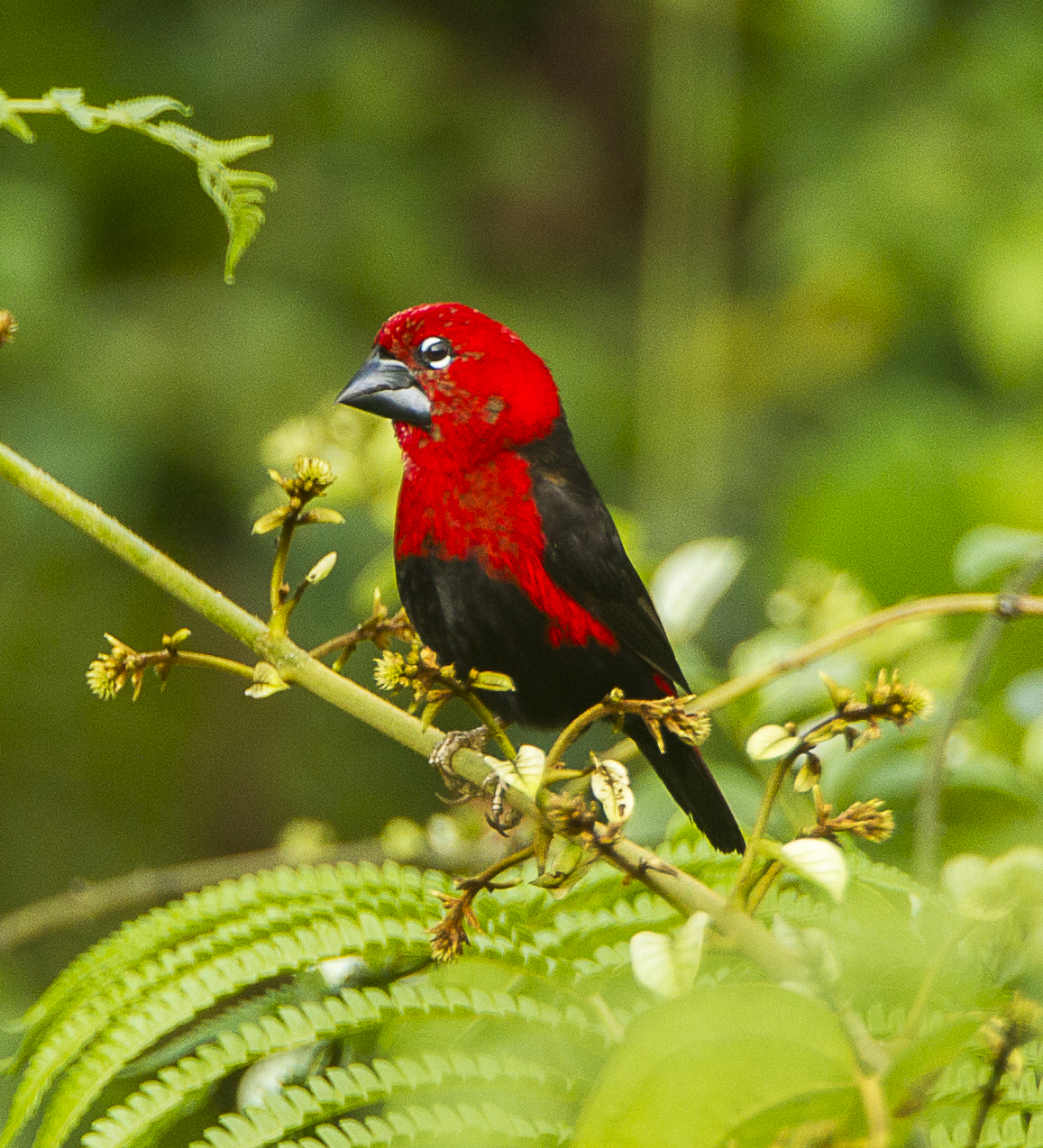

Conservation status
- Least Concern (IUCN 3.1)

Scientific classification
- Kingdom: Animalia
- Phylum: Chordata
- Class: Aves
- Order: Passeriformes
- Family: Estrildidae
- Genus: Pyrenestes
- Species: P. ostrinus

Binomial name
- Pyrenestes ostrinus (Vieillot, 1805)

= Black-bellied seedcracker =

Species of bird

The black-bellied seedcracker (Pyrenestes ostrinus) is a bird species of the family Estrildidae. They live in most Central African countries and inhabit tropical rainforest. The species comprises individuals with different physical appearance which are grouped into three categories (small, large and mega bill size). Adults are mainly granivorous but diet preference varies with bill size and food availability. Black-bellied seedcrackers also exhibit very distinctive colorations with bright patches of black and red, making them easy to identify in the field. Overall, little is known about this species apart from its range, but intensive studies are currently looking at bill size variations among individuals and their effects on behaviors.

== Taxonomy ==
Black-bellied seedcracker is one of the 27 African species of finch out of 141 worldwide. They are thought to originate from India and South Asia and would have expanded in Africa over time with continental dynamics and tectonic activities. Finches belong to the family Estrilidae, within the order Passeriformes. They are considered a monophyletic clade, meaning that from an evolutionary perspective, finches in the family Estrilidae constitute all the descendants of a common ancestor.

The species was first identified by Vieillot who formerly named it Loxia ostrina in 1805. However, in 1937, when Swainson reviewed the taxonomy and phylogeny of African finches, the species was moved to another genus and renamed Pyrenestes ostrinus. They are close relatives of crimson seedcrackers (Pyrenestes sanguineus) and lesser seedcrackers (Pyrenestes minor), two other similar African species of finch. However ranges barely overlap between those three species: Crimson seedcrackers live in Western African countries but north to Black-bellied seedcrackers. As for Lesser seedcrackers, they cover Eastern African countries.

== Description ==
Black-bellied seedcrackers are small passerine birds, measuring about 15 cm and exhibiting the typical silhouette of finch family members. The species is quite common across its range and easy to identify due to its body coloration which also earned its name. Indeed, a black bright patch covers its belly and back, and stands out against the redness of its head, chest and tail. There is a slight difference in coloration between sexes: where males exhibit those intense black patches, females are colored in dull brown. Females also tend to be smaller in size. A short and conical or large-based beak, combined with big circular and centered eyes give the visual impression of a small and stocky head

=== Polymorphism ===
Different variations among individuals, referred to as morphs, have been discovered in these last 50 years and constitute a current intensive field of research. This variability of the phenotype (physical appearance) is called polymorphism and concerns bill size of black-bellied seedcrackers. Yet, two morphs have been established: large-billed individuals and small-billed ones. A third type is thought to arise with an even larger beak called mega-billed morph but more data are needed to reach a universal agreement on whether or not it is different from the large-billed morph. Contrarily to most cases of polymorphisms in nature, bill-size variation in black-bellied seedcrackers isn't related to sex but instead seems to correlate with diet. The common hypothesis suggests that a small gene mutation occurred, and had a large impact on the morphology of individuals. Emergence of variations among individuals of a species is part of evolutionary processes. Having the ability to observe such phenomenon on a human scale is a real opportunity to try to understand those mechanisms better. Over time, this mutation could separate two extreme morphs into two distinct species in a process called disruptive selection.

== Habitat ==
Black-bellied seedcrackers inhabit tropical rainforest of Africa and nest in moist environments, near swamps, marsh, ponds, wet prairies and in moist broadleaf forest. However, they also occupy drier habitats such as dry broadleaf forest, grassland, savanna and shrubland. They are a very adaptable species. As a matter of fact, in locations contiguous to urban built-up areas, black-bellied seedcrackers are found in numbers in plantations (especially cacao) that offer high quality nesting branches. They are also common garden birds and benefit from feeders. Thus, the proximity to humans does not seem to negatively alter their population.

== Distribution ==
Black-bellied seedcrackers are native to Central Africa and resident birds, meaning they do not migrate over the seasons. Although little record exists for their historical home range, it is thought that it has not variated much over time. The last assessment, in 2016, showed the species occupies a wide range and is present in SE Ivory Coast, Ghana, Togo, Benin, South Sudan, Nigeria, Equatorial Guinea, Western and Southern Cameroon, Central African Republic, SW Chad, Gabon, Democratic Republic of Congo, Republic of Congo, Uganda, W Kenya, Angola, Zambia and SW Tanzania.

=== Population trend and conservation status ===
There is few historical records of black-bellied seedcracker population size. The first COSEWIC assessment of the species was made in 1988, and until 2000 the species was classified under lower risk/ least concerned category. In 2004, the species was reassessed and simply moved to the least concerned list. The 2016 population examination maintained this conservational status. Although the population size in unknown, it is thought to be relatively stable and not particularly threatened, black-bellied seedcracker being quite common birds within their range. Trends of their population and home range sizes have been modelized in relation to climate change for the next 67 years and although home range would slightly decrease on the borders, it is not concerning for the conservation of the species. Nowadays, the main threats faced by black-bellied seedcrackers emanate from nest predation by rats, snakes and feral cats, habitat over harvest and window collisions (increasing with urbanization).

== Behavior ==
=== Vocalization ===
Black-bellied seedcrackers, like most finches, are very social birds and thus maintain strong vocal bonds. They use calls made of low "peenk" to keep contact with each other while foraging or not in sighting positions, whereas their alarm call comprises "terr" sounds. Those are the common vocalization of black-bellied seedcrackers.

However, during the breeding period, going from March to October, they often sing as part of courtship display to attract a mate. Compared to other finches, they exhibit very complex songs. Their repertoire contains one to seven song types with 5 to 30 notes per song and a high variability among individuals. A song comports a series of repeated sounds, meaning an individual will sing identical notes multiple times, then switch to others, repeat them and switch again to others. The tone often varies from one individual to another and from one song to another. In addition, records of black-bellied seedcrackers show the species has the ability to produce double voice sounds, increasing complexity and diversity of their songs. Males and females sound alike except males usually sing more frequently.

Since two morphs are definitely established, scientists are looking at the effect of bill size on songs and courtship display (resonance, tonality, complexity). The average song frequency is 7 Hz. Hypotheses are that bill morphology influences songs in very subtle ways audible by potential mates; however, up until now studies remain inconclusive.

=== Diet ===
Diet is the second factor earning black-bellied seedcrackers their name. Adults feed on seeds that they open thanks to their hard beak. All of them mostly eat seeds from sedges, bushes from the genus Scleria. Depending on the season, the abundance of food and their bill morphology (small or large bill size), black-bellied seedcrackers broaden or specialize their diet. For example in periods of abundance, all individuals feed on various seeds, berries, insects, and few green leaves. However, in periods of scarcity, small-billed individuals specialized on soft seeds of sedge (Scleria goossensii), whereas large-billed morphs will go for hard seeds of sedge (Scleria verrucosa). Concerning the emerging mega morph, their larger beak allows them to open seeds of Scleria racemosa, a sedge species with an even harder shell. So all morphs coexist and really differ by their diet specificity in periods of food scarcity. Last, although the species is mostly granivorous, parents will feed juveniles with soft insects until the beak is completely formed and hardened.

=== Reproduction ===
Breeding season of black-bellied seedcrackers runs from March to November, peaking in April and September and coincides with rain seasons. It begins with courtship behaviors. Males show off by holding a piece of vegetation in their bill, like a long grass blade, leaf or grass panicle, and bob up and down perched in trees. Simultaneously, they sing to advertise their presence and attract females. Females are the one choosing their mate based on this display. This system in which one mate has complete choice over the other sex is called epigamic selection and is a common characteristic in the finch family. Mates stay together the entire breeding season and will build a nest a few meters from the ground using leaves. Although there is an overall synchronization among individuals for the entire breeding period and reproductive peaks, pairs differ in the timing and number of hatchings. Some will produce one hatching and others two throughout the year. Some also raise young in May, at the beginning of the breeding season, others around July and still others in October, toward the end of the season. A female lays in average 2 to 4 eggs and both parents take shifts to brood. Chicks hatch about 16 days later and parents will keep alternating to feed them. Young are altricial, meaning they are not directly independent. They stay about a month in the nest before taking off and foraging by themselves. The main cause of nest failure is due to predation (rats and snakes).

Interestingly, black-bellied seedcrackers breed regardless of bill morphs (either small-billed pairs, large-billed pairs or pairs with one individual of each morph), but no intermediate bill size arises from offspring of crosses between morphs. As a matter of fact, offspring from two small-billed parents have a small bill, large-billed pairs produce large-billed chicks, and crosses between morphs give rise to either large or small-billed individuals. So morphs are completely related to diet and not sexual selection.
