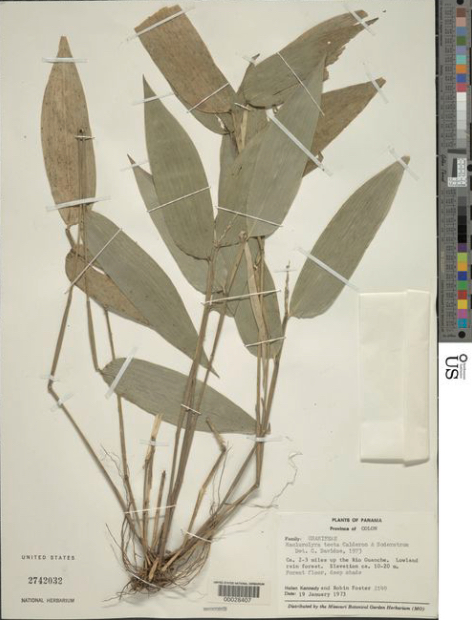

Scientific classification
- Kingdom: Plantae
- Clade: Tracheophytes
- Clade: Angiosperms
- Clade: Monocots
- Clade: Commelinids
- Order: Poales
- Family: Poaceae
- Subfamily: Bambusoideae
- Tribe: Olyreae
- Subtribe: Olyrinae
- Genus: Maclurolyra; C.E.Calderón ex Soderstr.
- Species: M. tecta

Binomial name
- Maclurolyra tecta C.E.Calderón ex Soderstr.

= Maclurolyra =

Genus of grasses

Maclurolyra is a genus of Neotropical plants in the grass family. The only known species is Maclurolyra tecta, native to Panama and Colombia. The genus is named in honor of Floyd Alonzo McClure.
