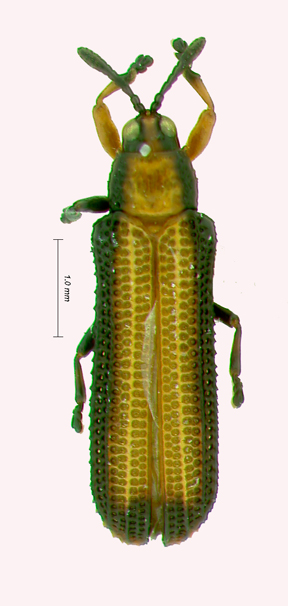

Scientific classification
- Kingdom: Animalia
- Phylum: Arthropoda
- Class: Insecta
- Order: Coleoptera
- Suborder: Polyphaga
- Infraorder: Cucujiformia
- Family: Chrysomelidae
- Genus: Heptispa
- Species: H. limbata

Binomial name
- Heptispa limbata (Baly, 1885)

Synonyms
- Uroplata limbata Baly, 1885

= Heptispa limbata =

Species of beetle

Heptispa limbata is a species of beetle of the family Chrysomelidae. It is found in Colombia, Costa Rica, French Guiana, Mexico (Yucatán) and Nicaragua.

== Description ==
The interocular space is very slightly produced. The antennae are rather longer than the head and thorax, slightly thickened towards the apex. The thorax is broader than long, the sides rounded, nearly straight and parallel behind the middle. The upper surface is transversely convex, excavated on the hinder disc, coarsely and closely punctured, a submarginal vitta on either side piceo-aeneous. The elytra are rather broader than the thorax, parallel, rounded at the apex, the outer margin serrulate. Each elytron has eight regular rows of punctures, the second, fourth, and sixth interspaces moderately costate.

== Biology ==
They have been recorded feeding on Cassia grandis, Cassia fruticosa, Olyra latifolia and Inga, Serjania and Machaerium species.
