= Eremitis =

Scientific classification
- Kingdom: Plantae
- Clade: Embryophytes
- Clade: Tracheophytes
- Clade: Angiosperms
- Clade: Monocots
- Clade: Commelinids
- Order: Poales
- Family: Poaceae
- Subfamily: Bambusoideae
- Tribe: Olyreae
- Subtribe: Parianinae
- Genus: Eremitis; Döll
- Species: E. parviflora

Binomial name
- Eremitis parviflora (Trin.) C.E.Calderón ex Soderstr.

Synonyms
- Pariana parviflora Trin.; Eremitis monothalamia Döll; Pariana monothalamia Tutin; Pariana microstachya Döll

Genus of grasses

Eremitis is a genus of bamboo plants in the grass family, that is endemic to Brazil.

The only known species is Eremitis parviflora, native to the States of Bahia, Pernambuco, Rio de Janeiro, and Espírito Santo in eastern Brazil.
