= Froesiochloa =

Scientific classification
- Kingdom: Plantae
- Clade: Tracheophytes
- Clade: Angiosperms
- Clade: Monocots
- Clade: Commelinids
- Order: Poales
- Family: Poaceae
- Subfamily: Bambusoideae
- Tribe: Olyreae
- Subtribe: Olyrinae
- Genus: Froesiochloa; G.A.Black
- Species: F. boutelouoides

Binomial name
- Froesiochloa boutelouoides G.A.Black

Genus of grasses

Froesiochloa is a genus of South American plants in the grass family. The only known species is Froesiochloa boutelouoides, native to Guyana, French Guiana, and Brazil (Amapá, Pará).

The genus Froesiochloa is in the family Poaceae in the major group Angiosperms (Flowering plants).[8]
