= Brasilochloa =

Scientific classification
- Kingdom: Plantae
- Clade: Tracheophytes
- Clade: Angiosperms
- Clade: Monocots
- Clade: Commelinids
- Order: Poales
- Family: Poaceae
- Subfamily: Bambusoideae
- Tribe: Olyreae
- Subtribe: Olyrinae
- Genus: Brasilochloa; R.P.Oliveira & L.G.Clark
- Species: B. sampaiana

Binomial name
- Brasilochloa sampaiana (Hitchc.) R.P.Oliveira & L.G.Clark

Synonyms
- Olyra sampaiana Hitchc.; Raddia sampaiana (Hitchc.) J.R.Grande; Sucrea sampaiana (Hitchc.) Soderstr.

Genus of bamboo

Brasilochloa is a genus of bamboo. It contains a single species, Brasilochloa sampaiana, an herbaceous perennial with culms up to 35 cm tall.

The plant was first collected in the early 20th century, and later thought extinct. In 2003 a small population with fewer than 100 individuals was discovered in a remnant of Atlantic Forest surrounded by extensive pastures in northern Rio de Janeiro state.
