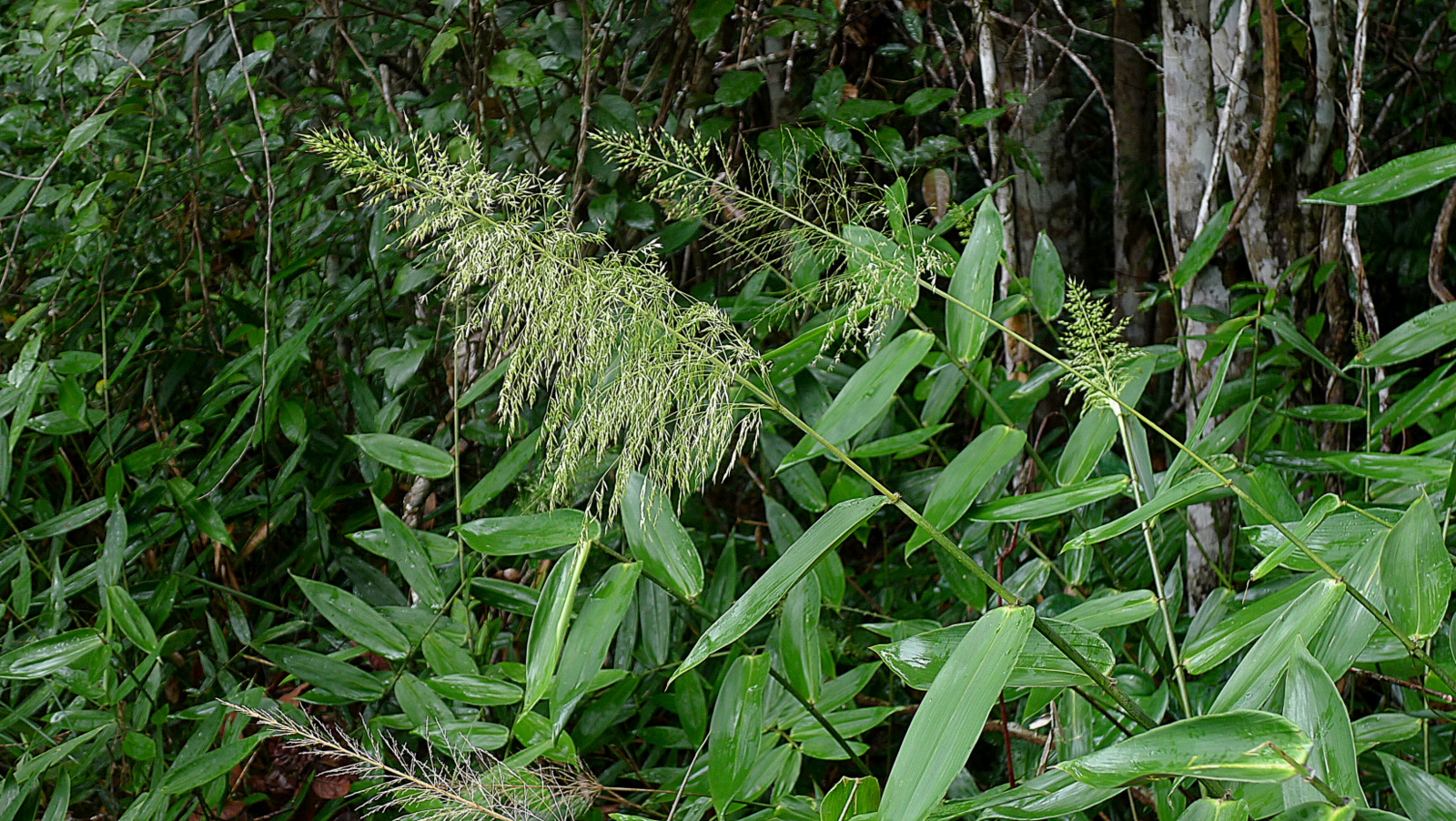
- Taquara micrantha

Scientific classification
- Kingdom: Plantae
- Clade: Tracheophytes
- Clade: Angiosperms
- Clade: Monocots
- Clade: Commelinids
- Order: Poales
- Family: Poaceae
- Subfamily: Bambusoideae
- Tribe: Olyreae
- Subtribe: Olyrinae
- Genus: Taquara; I.L.C.Oliveira & R.P.Oliveira

= Taquara (plant) =

Genus of bamboo

Taquara is a genus of bamboo. It contains two species native to tropical South America, ranging from Colombia and Venezuela through the Guianas, Brazil, Peru, Bolivia, and Paraguay to northeastern Argentina.

- Taquara colombiensis (Davidse & Zuloaga) I.L.C.Oliveira & R.P.Oliveira
- Taquara micrantha (Kunth) I.L.C.Oliveira & R.P.Oliveira
