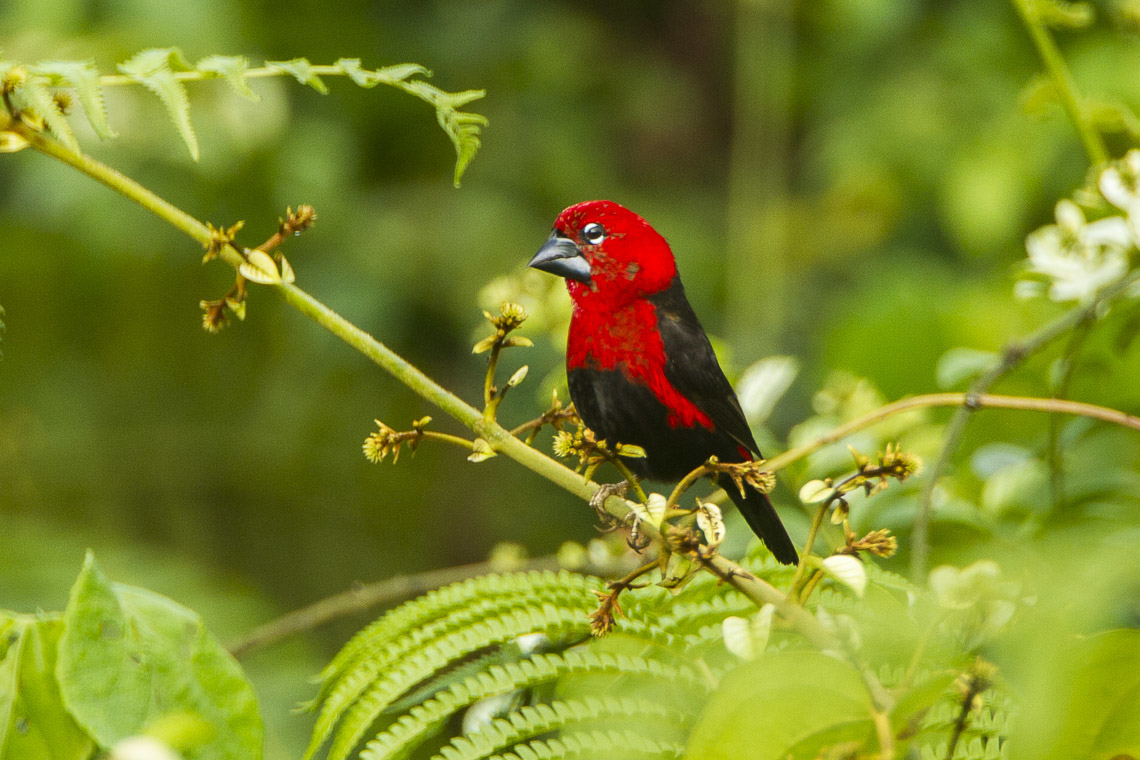
- Black-bellied seedcracker (Pyrenestes ostrinus)

Scientific classification
- Kingdom: Animalia
- Phylum: Chordata
- Class: Aves
- Order: Passeriformes
- Family: Estrildidae
- Genus: Pyrenestes; Swainson, 1837

Type species
- Pirenestes sanguineus Swainson, 1837

Species
- P. sanguineus P. ostrinus P. minor

= Seedcracker =

Genus of birds

The seedcrackers belong to the genus Pyrenestes within the estrildid finches family. These birds are found in Sub-Saharan Africa, and are gregarious seed eaters characterized by short, very thick, grey bills. All species display crimson coloration on the face and tail.

== Taxonomy ==
The genus Pyrenestes was introduced by the English zoologist William Swainson to accommodate a single species, Pirenestes sanguineus, the crimson seedcracker. This species is the type by monotypy. In the heading to Swainson's text the name is written as Pirenestes but this spelling is considered a lapsus as elsewhere in the text the name is spelled Pyrenestes. The genus name is combines the Ancient Greek πυρην/purēn, πυρηνος/purēnos meaning "fruit-stone" with -εστης/-estēs meaning "-eater".

== Species ==
The genus contains the following three species:

Image	Common name	Scientific name	Distribution
	Crimson seedcracker	Pyrenestes sanguineus	Burkina Faso, Côte d'Ivoire, Gambia, Guinea, Guinea-Bissau, Liberia, Mali, Senegal and Sierra Leone.
	Black-bellied seedcracker	Pyrenestes ostrinus	SE Ivory Coast, Ghana, Togo, Benin, South Sudan, Nigeria, Equatorial Guinea, Western and Southern Cameroon, Central African Republic, SW Chad, Gabon, Democratic Republic of Congo, Republic of Congo, Uganda, W Kenya, Angola, Zambia and SW Tanzania.
	Lesser seedcracker	Pyrenestes minor	Malawi, Mozambique, Tanzania and Zimbabwe.
