= Heptispa donckieri =

Scientific classification
- Kingdom: Animalia
- Phylum: Arthropoda
- Class: Insecta
- Order: Coleoptera
- Suborder: Polyphaga
- Infraorder: Cucujiformia
- Family: Chrysomelidae
- Genus: Heptispa
- Species: H. donckieri

Binomial name
- Heptispa donckieri (Pic, 1929)

Synonyms
- Octhispa (Hepthispa) donckieri Pic, 1929

Species of beetle

Heptispa donckieri is a species of beetle of the family Chrysomelidae. It is found in Brazil (Goiás).
