= Arundoclaytonia =

Scientific classification
- Kingdom: Plantae
- Clade: Tracheophytes
- Clade: Angiosperms
- Clade: Monocots
- Clade: Commelinids
- Order: Poales
- Family: Poaceae
- Subfamily: Panicoideae
- Tribe: Steyermarkochloeae
- Genus: Arundoclaytonia; Davidse & Ellis
- Species: A. dissimilis

Binomial name
- Arundoclaytonia dissimilis Davidse & Ellis

Genus of grasses

Arundoclaytonia is a genus of Brazilian plants in the grass family.

The only known species is Arundoclaytonia dissimilis, native to the States of Amazonas and Pará in Brazil.

== See also ==
- List of Poaceae genera
