= Steyermarkochloeae =

Scientific classification
- Kingdom: Plantae
- Clade: Tracheophytes
- Clade: Angiosperms
- Clade: Monocots
- Clade: Commelinids
- Order: Poales
- Family: Poaceae
- Clade: PACMAD clade
- Subfamily: Panicoideae
- Tribe: Steyermarkochloeae; Davidse & R.P. Ellis (1984)

Genera
- Arundoclaytonia; Steyermarkochloa

Tribe of grasses

Steyermarkochloeae is a tribe of the Panicoideae subfamily in the grasses (Poaceae), native to tropical South America. There are only two species in two genera, Arundoclaytonia and Steyermarkochloa. The tribe probably belongs to a basal lineage within the subfamily. Species in this tribe use the C_{3} photosynthetic pathway.
