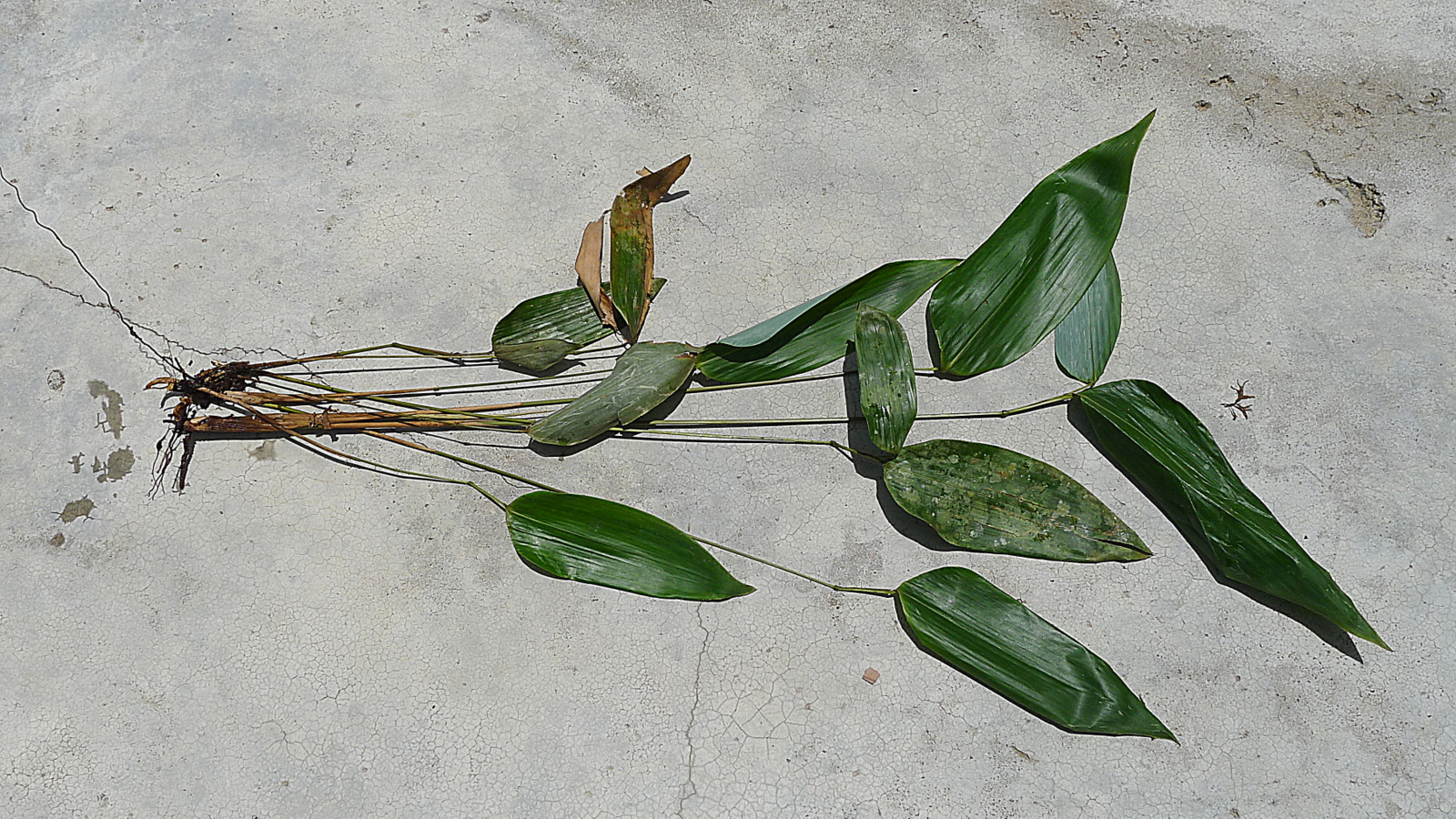
- Sucrea monophylla

Scientific classification
- Kingdom: Plantae
- Clade: Tracheophytes
- Clade: Angiosperms
- Clade: Monocots
- Clade: Commelinids
- Order: Poales
- Family: Poaceae
- Subfamily: Bambusoideae
- Tribe: Olyreae
- Subtribe: Olyrinae
- Genus: Sucrea; Soderstr.

Type species
- Sucrea monophylla Soderstr.

= Sucrea =

Genus of grasses

Sucrea is a genus of Brazilian plants in the grass family.

Species

1. Sucrea maculata Soderstr. - Rio de Janeiro, Espírito Santo
2. Sucrea monophylla Soderstr. - Bahia
3. †Sucrea sampaiana (Hitchc.) Soderstr. - Espírito Santo†
