= Heptispa solarii =

Scientific classification
- Kingdom: Animalia
- Phylum: Arthropoda
- Class: Insecta
- Order: Coleoptera
- Suborder: Polyphaga
- Infraorder: Cucujiformia
- Family: Chrysomelidae
- Genus: Heptispa
- Species: H. solarii

Binomial name
- Heptispa solarii (Weise, 1906)

Synonyms
- Octhispa (Heptispa) solarii Weise, 1906

Species of beetle

Heptispa solarii is a species of beetle of the family Chrysomelidae. It is found in Colombia, Costa Rica, Nicaragua and Panama.

== Biology ==
They have been recorded feeding on Bauhinia ungulata.
