= Arberella venezuelae =

Scientific classification
- Kingdom: Plantae
- Clade: Tracheophytes
- Clade: Angiosperms
- Clade: Monocots
- Clade: Commelinids
- Order: Poales
- Family: Poaceae
- Genus: Arberella
- Species: A. venezuelae

Binomial name
- Arberella venezuelae Judz. & Davidse

Species of grass

Arberella venezuelae is a species of bamboo endemic to Venezuela. It is found only in lowland rainforests in the upper Río Orinoco Valley, in the State of Amazonas.

Arberella venezuelaeis a caespitose perennial up to 60 cm tall, unbranched above the base. Leaves are simple, lanceolate to broadly ovate, 8–11 cm long, 20–35 mm wide. Inflorescences are terminal and axillary racemes, 3–5 at each node, each consisting of one pistillate (female) spike at the tip plus several staminate (male) spikes from the sides of the rachilla below.
