= Raddiella vanessiae =

Scientific classification
- Kingdom: Plantae
- Clade: Tracheophytes
- Clade: Angiosperms
- Clade: Monocots
- Clade: Commelinids
- Order: Poales
- Family: Poaceae
- Genus: Raddiella
- Species: R. vanessiae

Binomial name
- Raddiella vanessiae Judz.

Species of plant

Raddiella vanessiae is a species of bamboo. It is endemic to the Lambert Savanna of French Guiana. It is named after its discoverer, Vanessa Hequet, who found it in May 2001. It is believed to be the smallest of all bamboo species, with a height of only 2 cm.
