= Reitzia =

Scientific classification
- Kingdom: Plantae
- Clade: Tracheophytes
- Clade: Angiosperms
- Clade: Monocots
- Clade: Commelinids
- Order: Poales
- Family: Poaceae
- Subfamily: Bambusoideae
- Tribe: Olyreae
- Subtribe: Olyrinae
- Genus: Reitzia; Swallen
- Species: R. smithii

Binomial name
- Reitzia smithii Swallen

Genus of grasses

Reitzia is a genus of plants in the grass family.

The only known species is Reitzia smithii, native to southeastern Brazil (Santa Catarina, São Paulo, Rio de Janeiro).
