= Arberella =

- Arberella grayumii

Scientific classification
- Kingdom: Plantae
- Clade: Embryophytes
- Clade: Tracheophytes
- Clade: Spermatophytes
- Clade: Angiosperms
- Clade: Monocots
- Clade: Commelinids
- Order: Poales
- Family: Poaceae
- Subfamily: Bambusoideae
- Tribe: Olyreae
- Subtribe: Olyrinae
- Genus: Arberella; Soderstr. & C.E.Calderón 1979 not Arberiella D.D. Pant & Nautiyal

Type species
- Arberella dressleri Soderstr. & C.E.Calderón

Genus of grasses

Arberella is a genus of Neotropical bamboo in the grass family.

Species

1. Arberella bahiensis - Venezuela (Amazonas), Brazil (Bahia)
2. Arberella costaricensis - Costa Rica
3. Arberella dressleri - Panama
4. Arberella flaccida - Colombia, French Guiana, Suriname, Brazil (Amazonas, Rondônia, Mato Grosso)
5. Arberella grayumii - Costa Rica
6. Arberella lancifolia - Panama
7. Arberella venezuelae - Venezuela (Amazonas)

== See also ==
- List of Poaceae genera
