= Diandrolyra =

Scientific classification
- Kingdom: Plantae
- Clade: Tracheophytes
- Clade: Angiosperms
- Clade: Monocots
- Clade: Commelinids
- Order: Poales
- Family: Poaceae
- Subfamily: Bambusoideae
- Tribe: Olyreae
- Subtribe: Olyrinae
- Genus: Diandrolyra; Stapf

Type species
- Diandrolyra bicolor Stapf

Genus of grasses

Diandrolyra is a genus of Brazilian plants in the grass family.

Species

1. Diandrolyra bicolor Stapf - Espírito Santo
2. Diandrolyra pygmaea Soderstr. & Zuloaga ex R.P.Oliveira & L.G.Clark - Bahia
3. Diandrolyra tatianae Soderstr. & Zuloaga - São Paulo, Bahia, Rio de Janeiro, Espírito Santo
