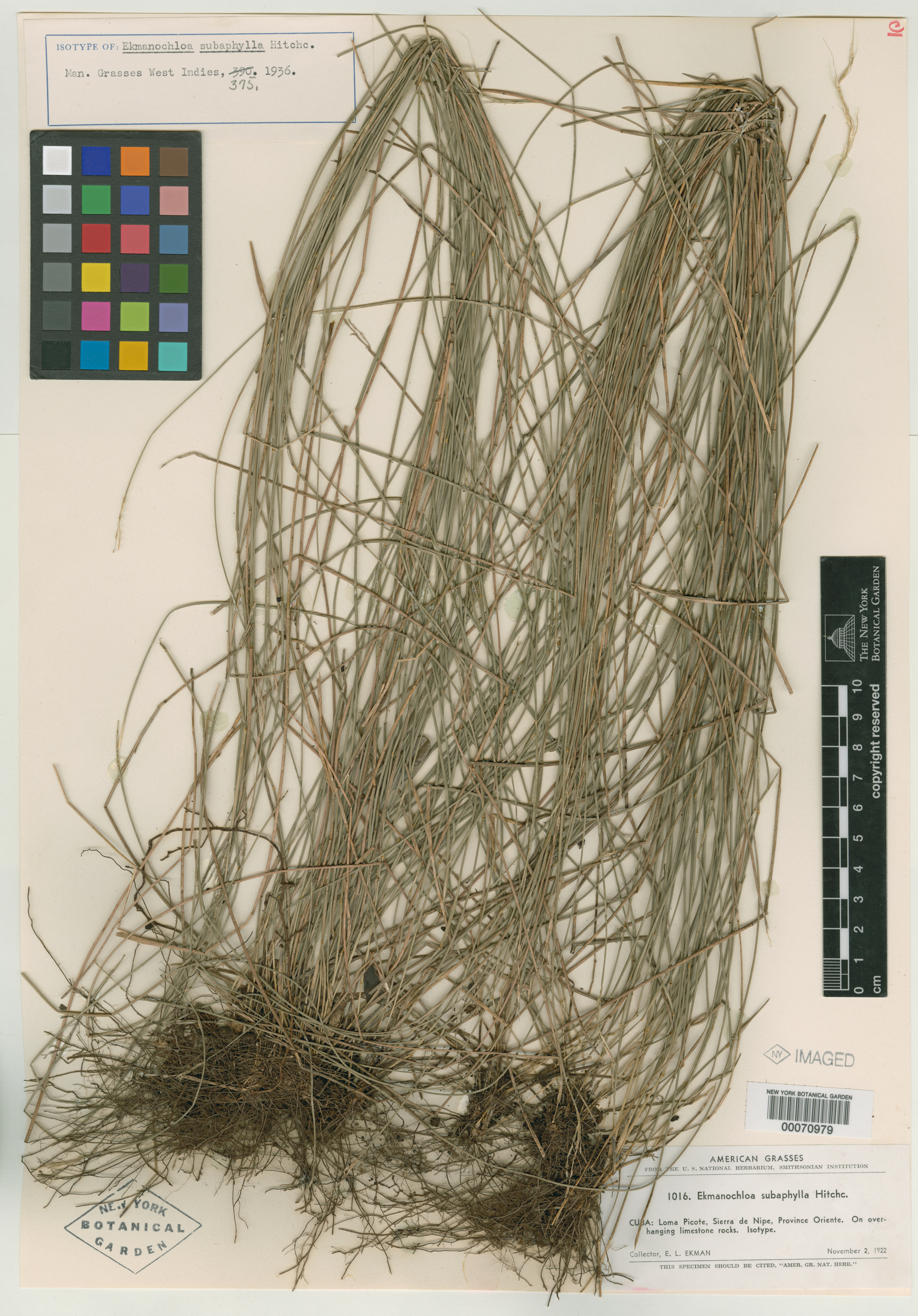

Scientific classification
- Kingdom: Plantae
- Clade: Tracheophytes
- Clade: Angiosperms
- Clade: Monocots
- Clade: Commelinids
- Order: Poales
- Family: Poaceae
- Subfamily: Bambusoideae
- Tribe: Olyreae
- Subtribe: Olyrinae
- Genus: Ekmanochloa; Hitchc.

Type species
- Ekmanochloa subaphylla Hitchc.

= Ekmanochloa =

Genus of grasses

Ekmanochloa is a genus of plants in the grass family endemic to Cuba.

== Description ==
Its habit is a perennial grass. Culms are erect; 38–63.25–100 cm long. Culm-nodes are constricted or swollen. Leaves are differentiated into sheath and blade, or with blades commonly suppressed, transferring photosynthetic function to sheath and culm. Leaf-blades are linear or lanceolate.

=== Species ===
Species include:

- Ekmanochloa aristata Ekman — Sierra de Moa.
- Ekmanochloa subaphylla C.L.Hitchc. — Sierra de Nipe.
