= Rehia =

Scientific classification
- Kingdom: Plantae
- Clade: Tracheophytes
- Clade: Angiosperms
- Clade: Monocots
- Clade: Commelinids
- Order: Poales
- Family: Poaceae
- Subfamily: Bambusoideae
- Tribe: Olyreae
- Subtribe: Olyrinae
- Genus: Rehia; Fijten
- Species: R. nervata

Binomial name
- Rehia nervata (Swallen) Fijten

Synonyms
- Bulbulus Swallen, name not validly published; Bulbulus nervatus Swallen, name not validly published because it coincides with a technical term

Genus of grasses

Rehia is a genus of plants in the grass family. The only known species is Rehia nervata, native to Brazil (Amapá, Pará, Maranhão) and to the Guianas (Suriname, Guyana, French Guiana).

The genus name of Rehia is in honour of Richard Eric Holttum (1895–1990), who was an English botanist and author.
