= Buergersiochloa =

Scientific classification
- Kingdom: Plantae
- Clade: Tracheophytes
- Clade: Angiosperms
- Clade: Monocots
- Clade: Commelinids
- Order: Poales
- Family: Poaceae
- Clade: BOP clade
- Subfamily: Bambusoideae
- Tribe: Olyreae
- Subtribe: Buergersiochloinae
- Genus: Buergersiochloa; Pilg.
- Species: B. bambusoides

Binomial name
- Buergersiochloa bambusoides Pilg.

Synonyms
- Buergersiochloa macrophylla S.T.Blake

Genus of grasses

Buergersiochloa is a genus of New Guinean in the grass family.

The only known species is Buergersiochloa bambusoides.

== See also ==
- List of Poaceae genera
