= Heptispa =

Scientific classification
- Kingdom: Animalia
- Phylum: Arthropoda
- Clade: Pancrustacea
- Class: Insecta
- Order: Coleoptera
- Suborder: Polyphaga
- Infraorder: Cucujiformia
- Family: Chrysomelidae
- Subfamily: Cassidinae
- Tribe: Chalepini
- Genus: Heptispa; Weise, 1906

Genus of leaf beetles

Heptispa is a genus of beetles belonging to the family Chrysomelidae.

== Species ==
- Heptispa bilineatithorax (Pic, 1929)
- Heptispa donckieri (Pic, 1929)
- Heptispa limbata (Baly, 1885)
- Heptispa ruficornis (Pic, 1929)
- Heptispa solarii (Weise, 1906)

== Selected former species ==
- Heptispa lineaticollis (Pic, 1928)
