= Raddiella =

Scientific classification
- Kingdom: Plantae
- Clade: Tracheophytes
- Clade: Angiosperms
- Clade: Monocots
- Clade: Commelinids
- Order: Poales
- Family: Poaceae
- Subfamily: Bambusoideae
- Tribe: Olyreae
- Subtribe: Olyrinae
- Genus: Raddiella; Swallen

Type species
- Raddiella nana (syn of R. esenbeckii) (Döll) Swallen

Genus of grasses

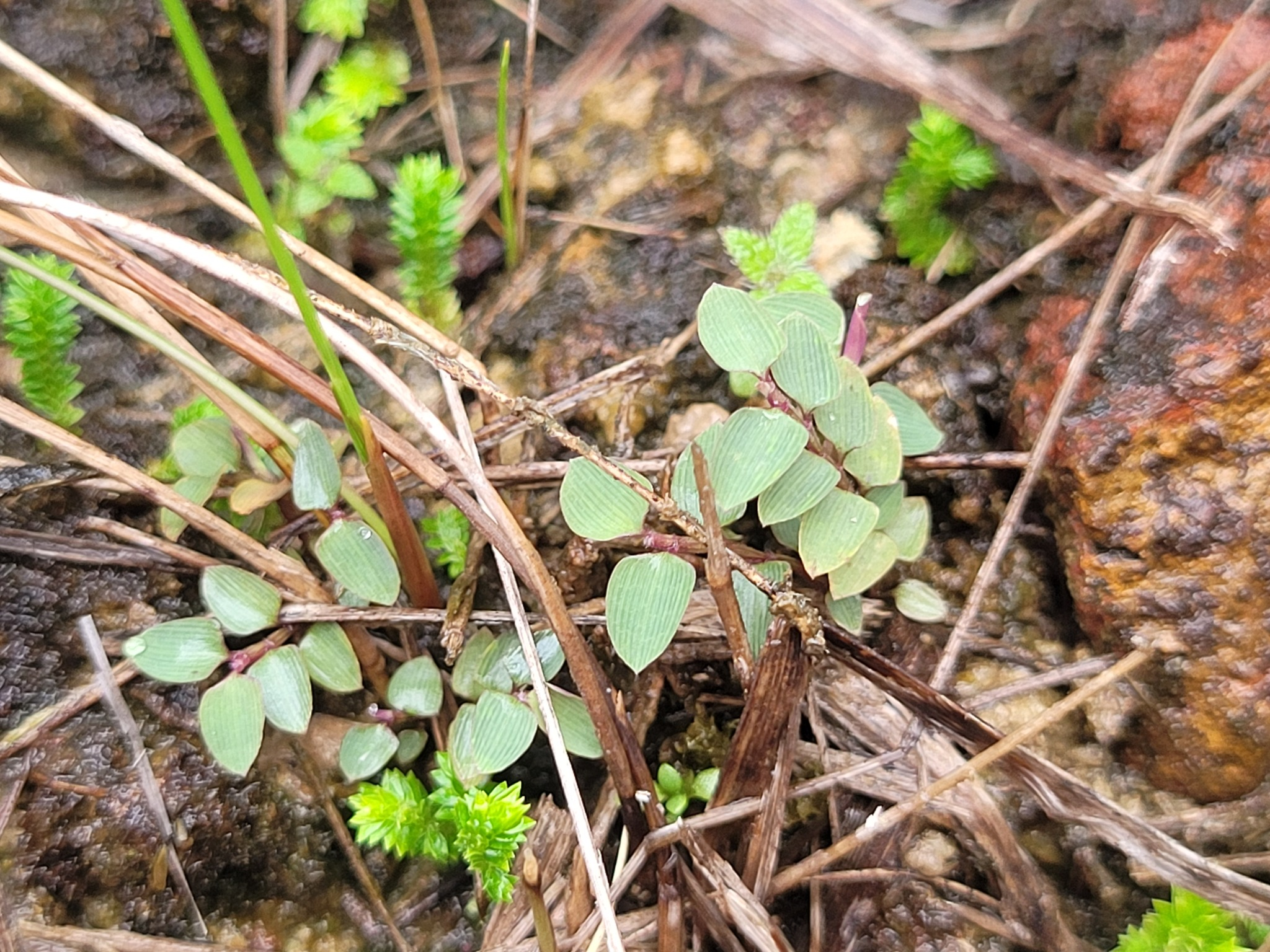
Raddiella vanessae

Raddiella is a genus of Neotropical plants in the grass family native to South America, Panama and Trinidad.

Species

1. Raddiella esenbeckii (Steud.) C.E.Calderón ex Soderstr. - Brazil, Bolivia, Colombia, Venezuela, French Guiana, Suriname, Guyana, Trinidad, Panama
2. Raddiella kaieteurana Soderstr. - Venezuela (Bolívar), Suriname, Guyana, Brazil (Pará)
3. Raddiella lunata Zuloaga & Judz. - Rondônia, Mato Grosso
4. Raddiella malmeana (Ekman) Swallen - Pará, Mato Grosso
5. Raddiella minima Judz. & Zuloaga - Pará, Mato Grosso
6. Raddiella molliculma (Swallen) C.E.Calderón ex Soderstr. - Caquetá
7. Raddiella potaroensis Soderstr. - Venezuela (Bolívar), Guyana
8. Raddiella vanessiae Judz. - French Guiana

Formerly included

see Parodiolyra

- Raddiella truncata - Parodiolyra lateralis
