= Steyermarkochloa =

Scientific classification
- Kingdom: Plantae
- Clade: Embryophytes
- Clade: Tracheophytes
- Clade: Spermatophytes
- Clade: Angiosperms
- Clade: Monocots
- Clade: Commelinids
- Order: Poales
- Family: Poaceae
- Subfamily: Panicoideae
- Tribe: Steyermarkochloeae
- Genus: Steyermarkochloa; Davidse & R.P.Ellis
- Species: S. angustifolia

Binomial name
- Steyermarkochloa angustifolia (Spreng.) Judz.

Synonyms
- Pariana angustifolia Spreng.; Steyermarkochloa unifolia Davidse & R.P.Ellis

Genus of grasses

Steyermarkochloa is a genus of plants in the grass family. The only known species is Steyermarkochloa angustifolia (Spreng.) Judz., which is native to Colombia (Guainía), Venezuela (Amazonas), and Brazil (Amazonas).

The genus name of Steyermarkochloa is in honour of Julian Alfred Steyermark (1909–1988), an American botanist. The genus was first described and published in Ann. Missouri Bot. Gard. Vol.71 on page 995 in 1985. Then the species was first published in Ann. Missouri Bot. Gard. Vol.77 on page 204 in 1990.
