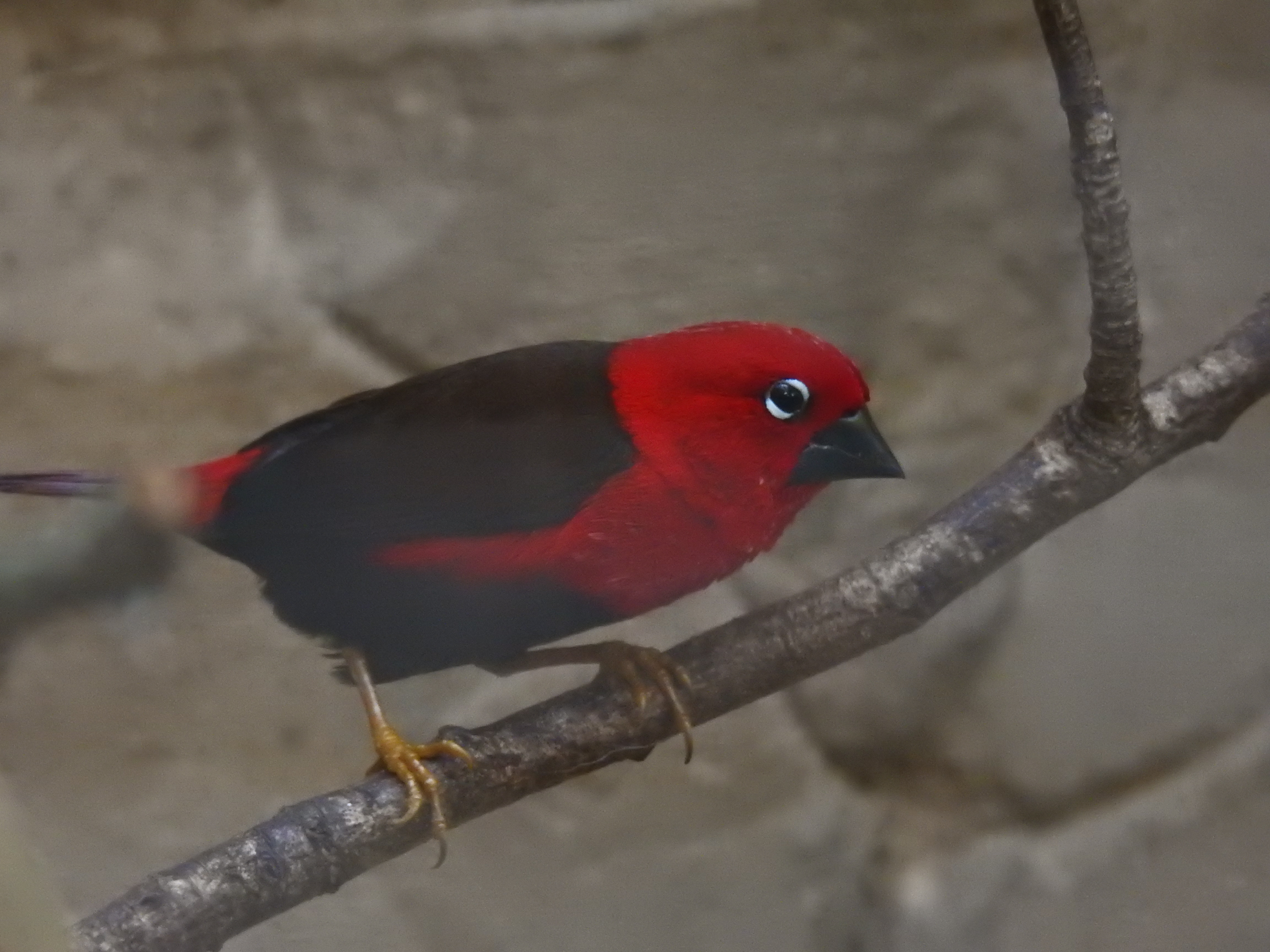
- male at ZooParc de Beauval

Conservation status
- Least Concern (IUCN 3.1)

Scientific classification
- Kingdom: Animalia
- Phylum: Chordata
- Class: Aves
- Order: Passeriformes
- Family: Estrildidae
- Genus: Pyrenestes
- Species: P. sanguineus

Binomial name
- Pyrenestes sanguineus Swainson, 1837

= Crimson seedcracker =

Species of African finch

The crimson seedcracker (Pyrenestes sanguineus) is a common species of estrildid finch found in Africa. It has an estimated global extent of occurrence of 834,000 km^{2} (322,000 sq mi). It is found in Burkina Faso, Côte d'Ivoire, Gambia, Guinea, Guinea-Bissau, Liberia, Mali, Senegal and Sierra Leone. The International Union for Conservation of Nature has classified the species as being of least concern.

== Description ==
The crimson seedcracker grows to a length of about 14 cm (5.5 in). It is a plump bird with a domed head and a broad, sharply-pointed bill. The plumage on the upper parts is dark brown or brownish-black while the head, sides of neck, face, chin, throat, breast and flanks are glossy crimson-red. The outer tail feathers are brown, and the rump and the central pair of tail feathers are crimson. The underparts are dark brown, the bill is steel blue, the eye is brown, the eyelids white and the legs are brown or olive-brown. The sexes are similar except that the upper parts of the female are a paler shade of brown.

== Distribution and habitat ==
The crimson seedcracker is native to tropical West Africa, where its range extends from Senegal and Gambia to southern Mali and Ivory Coast. It occurs in dense undergrowth in freshwater swamps, marshes, besides tidal creeks and rice paddies, and in bushy habitats near rivers and streams.

== Behaviour ==
The crimson seedcracker has a broad, strong bill and feeds on grass, sedge and rice seeds, especially seeds that are hard to break open. It forages through the undergrowth, but can sometimes be observed feeding on the ground in the open in the vicinity of scrub, in pairs or in the company of bluebills or other small birds. When it takes to the wing, it rises with a series of twists, before setting off with an undulating flight, similar to that of a sparrow. Breeding takes place in September. The crimson seedcracker exhibits polymorphism, there being two morphs, large-billed individuals and small-billed ones. These morphs are unrelated to sex, body size, age or geographical origin, but are associated with differences in diet, with the larger-billed morphs able to tackle larger and harder seeds such as those of the nutrushes; it is hypothesized that a mutation in a single gene had a large effect on the morphology of individuals.

== Status ==
The crimson seedcracker is a non-migratory species and has a wide range in West Africa. It is a shy and unobtrusive bird so may easily be overlooked, but the population seems stable and the International Union for Conservation of Nature has assessed its conservation status as being of "least concern".
