= Megachile tecta =

Scientific classification
- Domain: Eukaryota
- Kingdom: Animalia
- Phylum: Arthropoda
- Class: Insecta
- Order: Hymenoptera
- Family: Megachilidae
- Genus: Megachile
- Species: M. tecta

Binomial name
- Megachile tecta Radoszkowski, 1888

Species of leafcutter bee (Megachile)

Megachile tecta is a species of bee in the family Megachilidae. It was described by Radoszkowski in 1888.
