= Agnesia =

Scientific classification
- Kingdom: Plantae
- Clade: Embryophytes
- Clade: Tracheophytes
- Clade: Spermatophytes
- Clade: Angiosperms
- Clade: Monocots
- Clade: Commelinids
- Order: Poales
- Family: Poaceae
- Subfamily: Bambusoideae
- Tribe: Olyreae
- Subtribe: Olyrinae
- Genus: Agnesia; Zuloaga & Judz.
- Species: A. lancifolia

Binomial name
- Agnesia lancifolia (Mez) Zuloaga & Judz.

Synonyms
- Olyra lancifolia Mez

Genus of grasses

Agnesia is a genus of herbaceous South American bamboo in the grass family.

It is named in honor of agrostologist (botanical specialist in the area of grasses) Mary Agnes Chase (1869-1963).

The only known species is Agnesia lancifolia, native to lowland tropical rainforests of Brazil, Colombia and Peru.

Agnesia lancifolia is perennial herb with 7-10 stems per clump, each up to 50 cm tall. Lower leaves lacking blades or with blades less than 5 mm long; upper leaves with blades up to 16 cm long. Each stem has 1-6 racemes at the tips of the culm or from the axils of the upper leaves, pistillate (female) and staminate (male) flowers in different spikelets on the same plant.

== See also ==
- List of Poaceae genera
