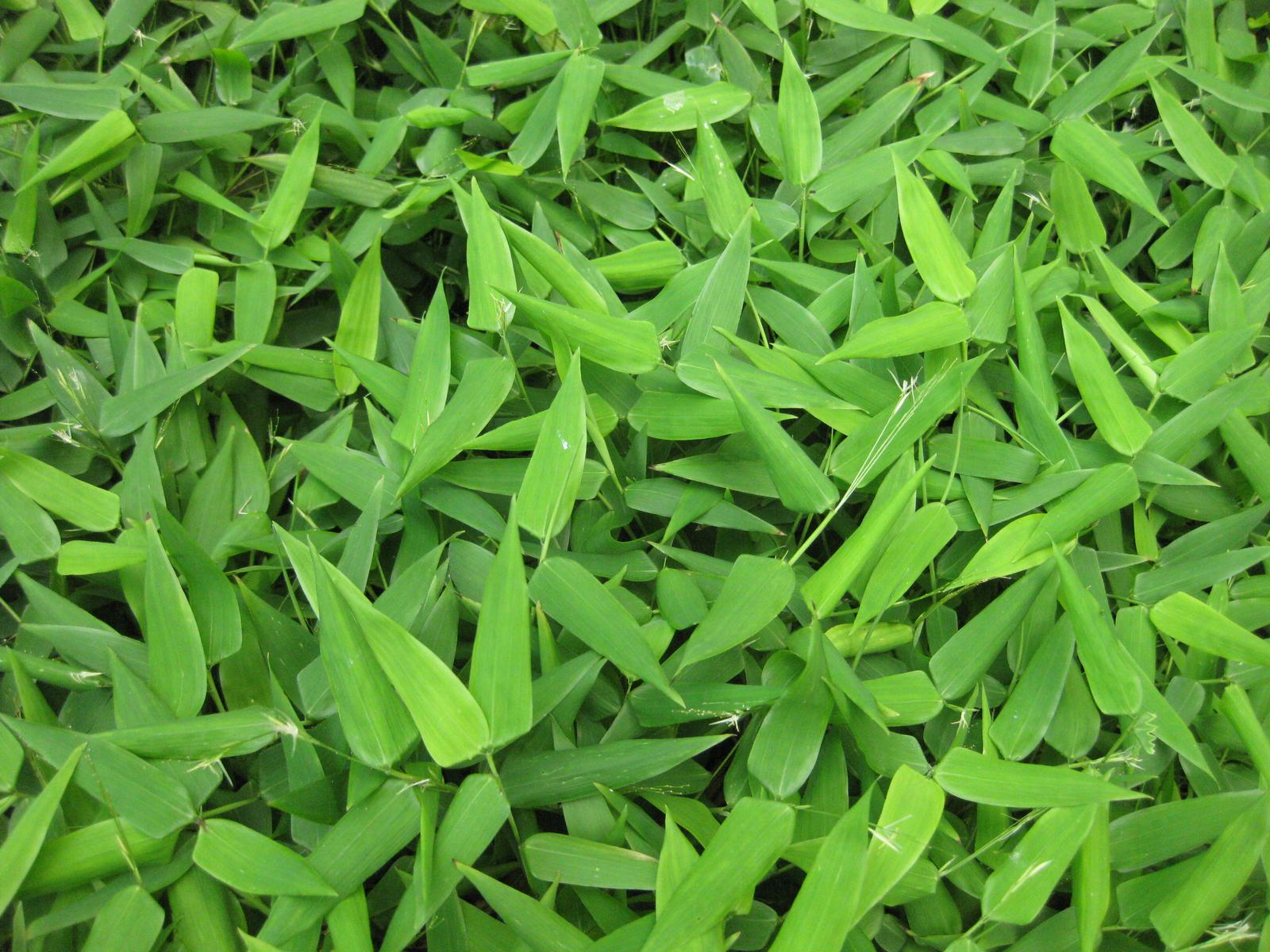

Scientific classification
- Kingdom: Plantae
- Clade: Tracheophytes
- Clade: Angiosperms
- Clade: Monocots
- Clade: Commelinids
- Order: Poales
- Family: Poaceae
- Subfamily: Bambusoideae
- Tribe: Olyreae
- Subtribe: Olyrinae
- Genus: Lithachne; P.Beauv.

Type species
- Lithachne axillaris (syn. of L. pauciflora) P.Beauv.

= Lithachne =

Genus of grasses

Lithachne is a genus of Neotropical plants in the grass family.

Species

1. Lithachne horizontalis Chase - Minas Gerais, Rio de Janeiro, São Paulo, Mato Grosso
2. Lithachne humilis Soderstr. - Honduras
3. Lithachne pauciflora (Sw.) P.Beauv. - widespread from Jalisco to Paraguay
4. Lithachne pinetii (C.Wright) Chase - Cuba
