= Cryptochloa =

Scientific classification
- Kingdom: Plantae
- Clade: Tracheophytes
- Clade: Angiosperms
- Clade: Monocots
- Clade: Commelinids
- Order: Poales
- Family: Poaceae
- Subfamily: Bambusoideae
- Tribe: Olyreae
- Subtribe: Olyrinae
- Genus: Cryptochloa; Swallen

Type species
- Cryptochloa variana Swallen

Genus of grasses

Cryptochloa is a genus of Neotropical plants in the grass family, widespread across much of Mexico, Central America, and South America.

Species

1. Cryptochloa capillata (Trin.) Soderstr. - French Guiana, Brazil
2. Cryptochloa concinna (Hook.f.) Swallen - Colombia, Central America, southern Mexico
3. Cryptochloa decumbens Soderstr. & Zuloaga - Panama
4. Cryptochloa dressleri Soderstr. - Panama
5. Cryptochloa soderstromii Davidse - Panama
6. Cryptochloa strictiflora (E.Fourn.) Swallen - Central America, southern Mexico, Ecuador
7. Cryptochloa unispiculata Soderstr. - Bolivia, Peru, Ecuador, Colombia, Brazil (Acre)
8. Cryptochloa variana Swallen - Honduras, Panama, Colombia
