= Piresiella =

Scientific classification
- Kingdom: Plantae
- Clade: Tracheophytes
- Clade: Angiosperms
- Clade: Monocots
- Clade: Commelinids
- Order: Poales
- Family: Poaceae
- Subfamily: Bambusoideae
- Tribe: Olyreae
- Subtribe: Olyrinae
- Genus: Piresiella; Judz., Zuloaga & Morrone
- Species: P. strephioides

Binomial name
- Piresiella strephioides (Griseb.) Judz., Zuloaga & Morrone

Synonyms
- Olyra strephioides Griseb.; Mniochloa strephioides (Griseb.) Chase

Genus of grasses

Piresiella is a genus of Cuban bamboo in the grass family. The only known species is Piresiella strephioides, found in palm savannahs and streambanks in the lowlands of western Cuba.
