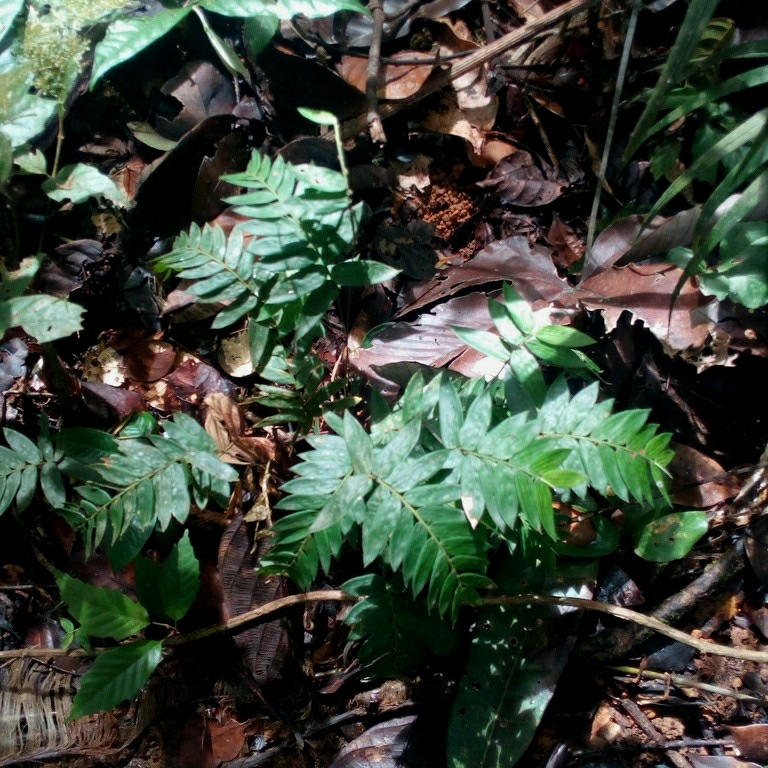
- P. goeldii

Scientific classification
- Kingdom: Plantae
- Clade: Tracheophytes
- Clade: Angiosperms
- Clade: Monocots
- Clade: Commelinids
- Order: Poales
- Family: Poaceae
- Subfamily: Bambusoideae
- Tribe: Olyreae
- Genus: Piresia; Swallen

Type species
- Piresia goeldii Swallen

= Piresia =

Genus of grasses

Piresia is a genus of South American plants in the grass family.

Species

1. Piresia goeldii Swallen - French Guiana, Suriname, Venezuela (Amazonas), Colombia (Amazonas), Ecuador, Peru (Loreto), Brazil (Pará, Amazonas, Rondônia)
2. Piresia leptophylla Soderstr. - Colombia (Amazonas), Ecuador, Peru, Brazil(Pernambuco, Amazonas, Bahia), Trinidad and Tobago
3. Piresia macrophylla Soderstr. - French Guiana, Peru (San Martín, Loreto), Brazil (Amazonas, Rondônia, Acre)
4. Piresia palmula M.L.S.Carvalho & R.P.Oliveira - Brazil (Bahia)
5. Piresia sympodica (Döll) Swallen - Venezuela, French Guiana, Suriname, Guyana, Colombia, Ecuador, Peru, Brazil, Trinidad and Tobago
