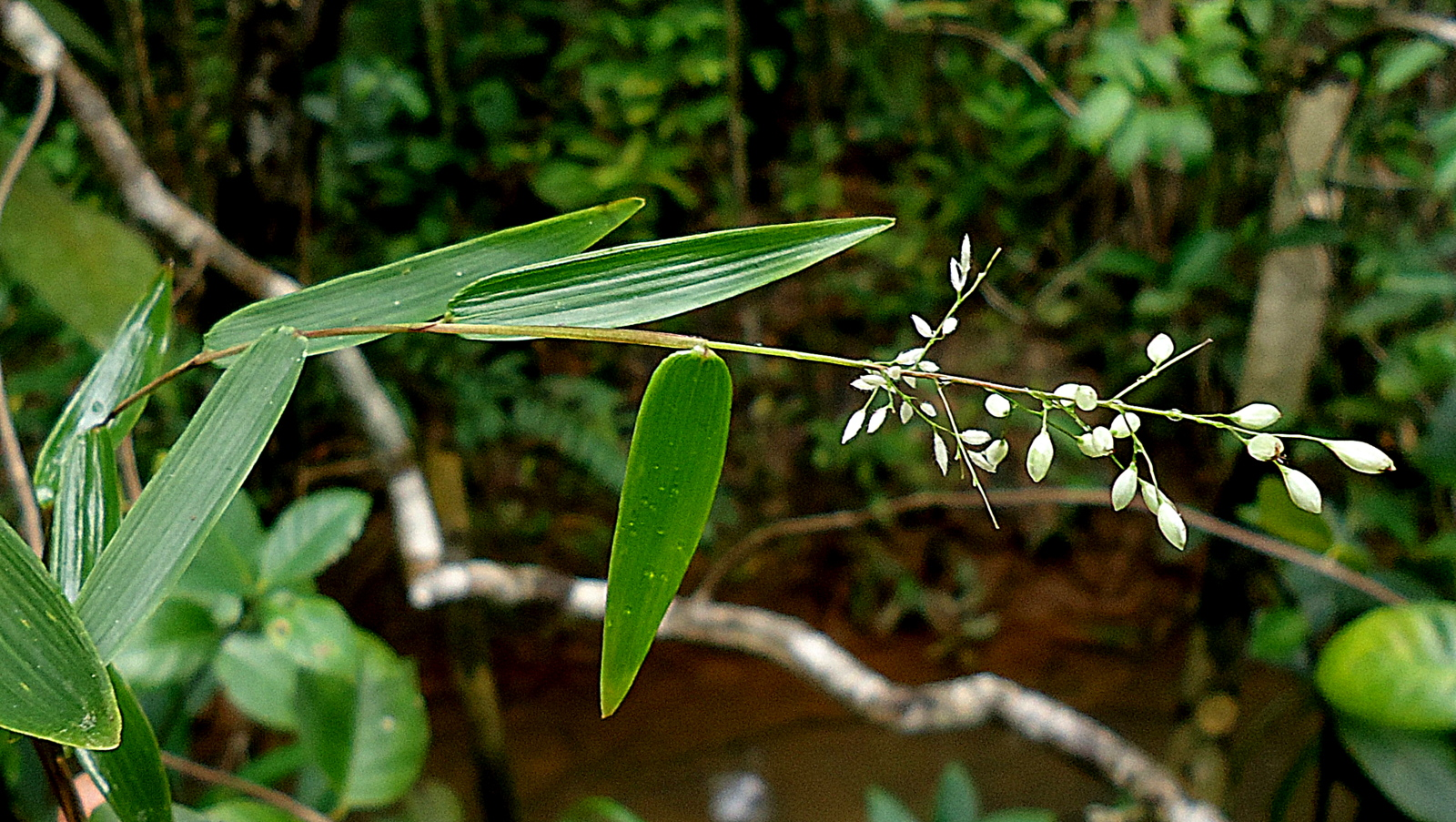
- Parodiolyra ramosissima

Scientific classification
- Kingdom: Plantae
- Clade: Tracheophytes
- Clade: Angiosperms
- Clade: Monocots
- Clade: Commelinids
- Order: Poales
- Family: Poaceae
- Subfamily: Bambusoideae
- Tribe: Olyreae
- Subtribe: Olyrinae
- Genus: Parodiolyra; Soderstr. & Zuloaga

Type species
- Parodiolyra ramosissima (Trin.) Soderstr. & Zuloaga

= Parodiolyra =

Genus of grasses

Parodiolyra is a genus of Neotropical plants in the grass family.

Species

1. Parodiolyra aratitiyopensis J.R.Grande - Venezuela (Amazonas)
2. Parodiolyra colombiensis Davidse & Zuloaga - Colombia (Caquetá)
3. Parodiolyra lateralis (J.Presl ex Nees) Soderstr. & Zuloaga - Nicaragua, Costa Rica, Panama, Colombia, Venezuela, Guyana, Suriname, Ecuador, Peru, Brazil (Roraima, Amazonas)
4. Parodiolyra luetzelburgii (Pilg.) Soderstr. & Zuloaga - Brazil, Colombia, Venezuela, Guyana, Suriname, French Guiana
5. Parodiolyra micrantha (Kunth) Davidse & Zuloaga - Brazil, Colombia, Venezuela, Guyana, Suriname, French Guiana, Peru, Bolivia, Argentina, Paraguay
6. Parodiolyra ramosissima (Trin.) Soderstr. & Zuloaga - Brazil (Bahia)
