= Cleofé Calderón =

Argentine agrostologist (1929–2007)

Cleofé Elsa Calderón
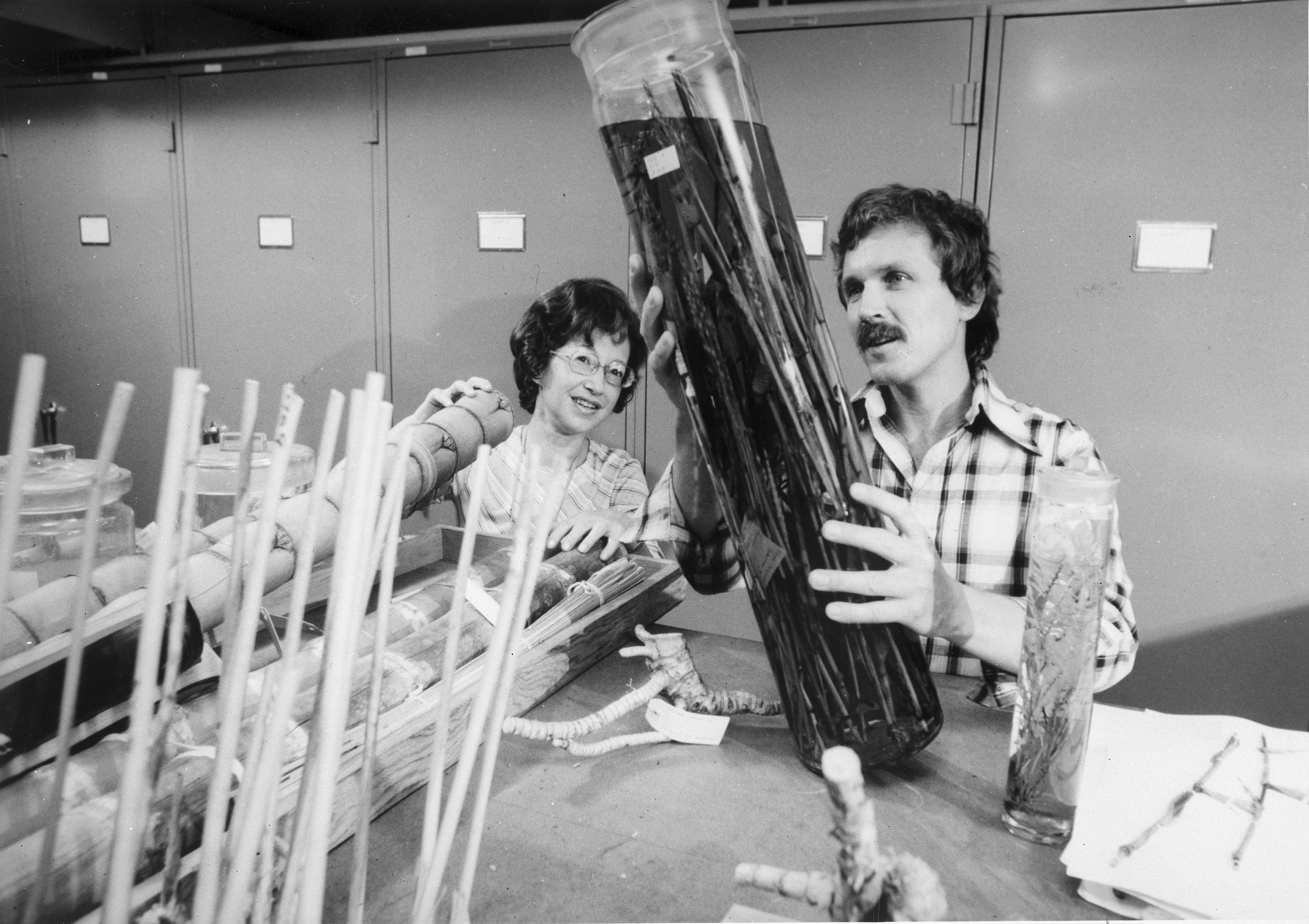
- Cleofé E. Calderón and Thomas R. Soderstrom examining bamboo samples in 1977.
- Born: 26 October 1929; Buenos Aires, Argentina
- Died: March 19, 2007 (aged 77); Buenos Aires, Argentina
- Scientific career
- Fields: Agrostology
- Institutions: National Museum of Natural History (US National Herbarium)
- Author abbrev. (botany): C.E.Calderón

Cleofé Elsa Calderón (October 26, 1929 – March 19, 2007) was an Argentine agrostologist.

== Career ==
She studied at the University of Buenos Aires, with Lorenzo Parodi.

In October 1971, Calderón performed field operations and collected living materials of a new genus of grasses; the genus was named after her: Calderonella.

In 1976, Calderón rediscovered Anomochloa in Bahia, Brazil, with the help of assistant Talmon Soares dos Santos. By identifying this tropical forest grass, Calderón provided specimens for detailed morphological and anatomical study that confirmed it as a grass.

== Selected works ==
- Parodi, Lorenzo R.; Calderón, Cleofé E. (1961). "Estudio histotaxonómico del género Lygeum (Gramineae)" [Phytotaxonomy study on the genus Lygeum (Gramineae)]. Revista Argentina de Agronomía (in Spanish) (28). Buenos Aires: 81–99. OCLC 813553436.
- Calderón, Cleofé E.; Soderstrom, Thomas R. (1967). "Las gramíneas tropicales afines a Olyra L." [Tropical gramineae related to Olyra L.]. In Len, Herman (ed.). Atas do Simpósio sôbre a Biota Amazônica [Proceedings of the Symposium on Amazon Biota] (in Spanish). Vol. 4 (Botânica). Rio de Janeiro, Brazil: National Research Council (CNPq). pp. 67–76. OCLC 758469250.
- Soderstrom, Thomas R.; Calderón, Cleofé E. (June 1971). "Insect Pollination in Tropical Rain Forest Grasses". Biotropica. 3 (1). Washington, D.C.: 1–16. Bibcode:1971Biotr...3....1S. doi:10.2307/2989701. ISSN 0006-3606. JSTOR 2989701. OCLC 708279941.
- Calderón, Cleofé E.; Soderstrom, Thomas R. (26 March 1973). Morphological and anatomical considerations of the grass subfamily Bambusoideae based on the new genus Maclurolyra (PDF). Smithsonian contributions to botany, 11. Washington, D.C.: Smithsonian Institution Press. OCLC 447320.
- Soderstrom, Thomas R.; Calderón, Cleofé E. (September 1974). "Primitive Forest Grasses and Evolution of the Bambusoideae". Biotropica. 6 (3). Washington, D.C.: 141–153. Bibcode:1974Biotr...6..141S. doi:10.2307/2989646. ISSN 0006-3606. JSTOR 2989646. OCLC 708279941.
- Soderstrom, Thomas R.; Calderón, Cleofé E. (April–June 1978). "The Species of Chusquea (Poaceae: Bambusoideae) with Verticillate Buds". Brittonia. 30 (2). Washington, D.C.: 154–164. Bibcode:1978Britt..30..154S. doi:10.2307/2806642. ISSN 0007-196X. JSTOR 2806642. OCLC 45446676. S2CID 33215357.
- Soderstrom, Thomas R.; Calderón, Cleofé E. (July–September 1978). "Chusquea and Swallenochloa (Poaceae: Bambusoideae): Generic Relationships and New Species". Brittonia. 30 (3). Washington, D.C.: 297–312. Bibcode:1978Britt..30..297S. doi:10.2307/2806264. ISSN 0007-196X. JSTOR 2806264. OCLC 45446676. S2CID 36749785.
- Soderstrom, Thomas R.; Calderón, Cleofé E. (September 1979). "A Commentary on the Bamboos (Poaceae: Bambusoideae)". Biotropica. 11 (3). Washington, D.C.: 161–172. Bibcode:1979Biotr..11..161S. doi:10.2307/2388036. ISSN 0006-3606. JSTOR 2388036. OCLC 708279941.
- Soderstrom, Thomas R.; Calderón, Cleofé E. (October–December 1979). "Arberella (Poaceae: Bambusoideae): A New Genus from Tropical America". Brittonia. 31 (4). Washington, D.C.: 433–445. Bibcode:1979Britt..31..433S. doi:10.2307/2805992. ISSN 0007-196X. JSTOR 2805992. OCLC 45446676. S2CID 36010449.
- Calderón, Cleofé E.; Soderstrom, Thomas R. (13 February 1980). The genera of Bambusoideae (Poaceae) of the American Continent: keys and comments (PDF). Smithsonian contributions to botany, 44. Washington, D.C.: Smithsonian Institution Press. OCLC 5029833.
