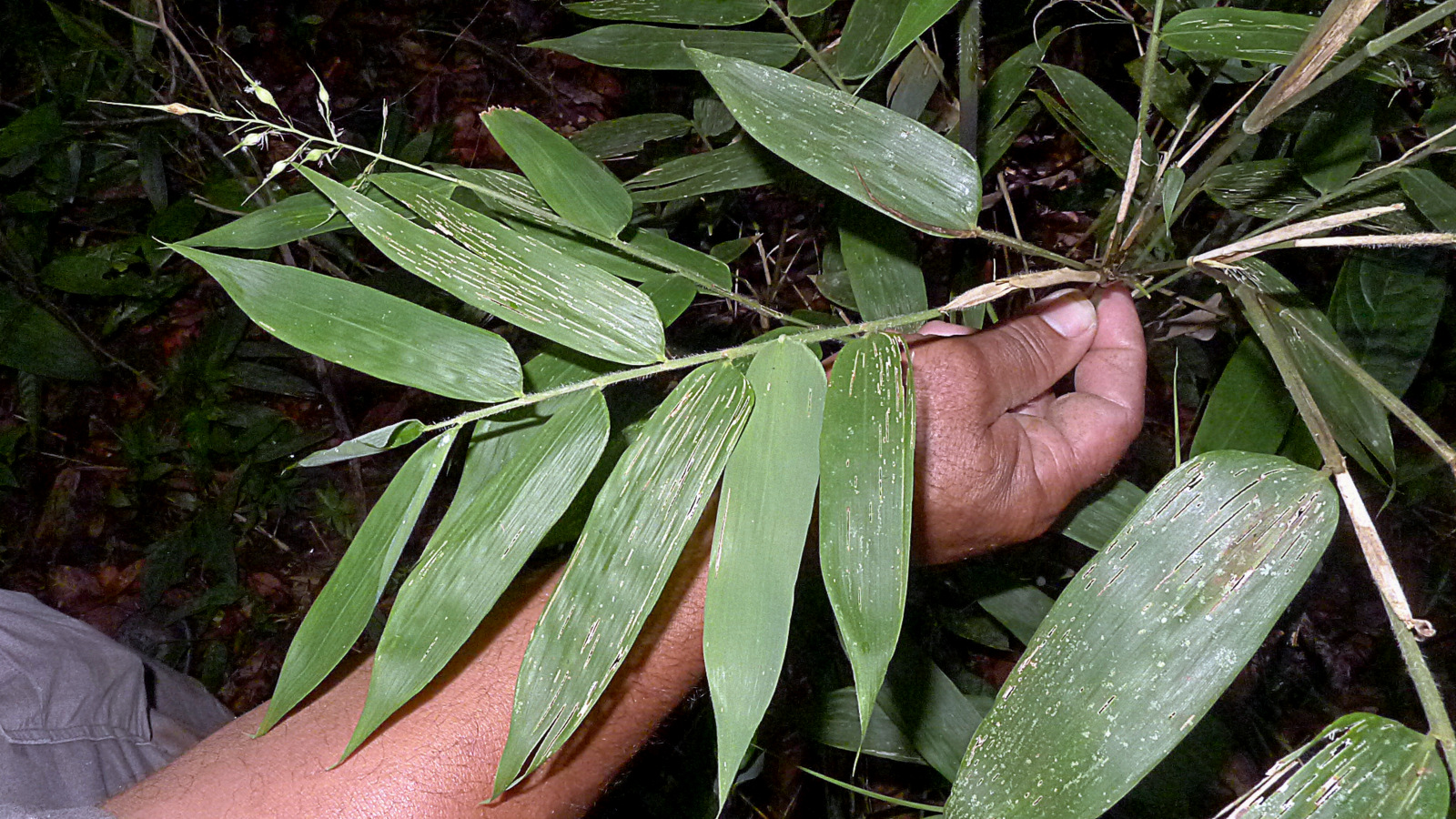

Scientific classification
- Kingdom: Plantae
- Clade: Tracheophytes
- Clade: Angiosperms
- Clade: Monocots
- Clade: Commelinids
- Order: Poales
- Family: Poaceae
- Genus: Olyra
- Species: O. latifolia

Binomial name
- Olyra latifolia L.

Synonyms
- Olyra arundinacea Kunth; Olyra brasiliensis (Bertol.) Spreng.; Olyra brevifolia Schumach.; Olyra cordifolia Kunth; Olyra cordifolia var. cordifolia; Olyra cordifolia var. scabriuscula Döll; Olyra guineensis Steud.; Olyra media Desv.; Olyra paniculata Sw.; Olyra pubescens Raddi; Olyra scabra Nees; Olyra surinamensis Hochst. ex Steud.; Stipa latifolia (L.) Raspail

= Olyra latifolia =

Species of plant

Olyra latifolia, commonly known as carrycillo, is a species of bamboo in the grass family Poaceae. It occurs in Mexico, Central and South America, and in sub-Saharan Africa. It is a common species, up to 5 m (16 ft) tall, growing prolifically in rainforests, particularly near the margins.

== Description ==
This is a sturdy bamboo up to 5 m (16 ft) tall, with erect or arching stems, sometimes climbing or leaning on other vegetation, or lying flat on the ground. The leaves are ovate to oblong, up to 20 cm (8 in) long and 7 cm (3 in) wide. The leaf base is constricted into a hairy "pseudo-petiole" and the apex is tipped by a long point. The inflorescence is a terminal panicle up to 18 cm (7 in) long which is branched, the branches ascending stiffly or spreading. The tip of each branch is swollen and bears a single large, pistillate floret while further down the branch are several smaller, slender-stemmed, staminate florets, the inferior glumes being half the length of the superior glumes.

== Distribution and habitat ==
This bamboo is found in both the New World and the Old World. In the Americas its range includes the West Indies, Mexico and Central and South America as far south as Paraguay, Bolivia and northern Argentina, while in Africa it occurs in sub-Saharan Africa southwards to Angola, Zambia, Zimbabwe and Mozambique, as well as in Madagascar and the Comoro Islands and has been naturalised in South Africa. It is a common, rather weedy rainforest species growing in both primary and secondary forests, and gallery forests, mostly near the edges of the trees, and generally at altitudes of less than 1,000 m (3,300 ft).

== Cultivation ==
This bamboo can be propagated from culms (stems) growing up from the rhizome or from seed.

== Uses ==
The stems of this bamboo have been used for drinking straws and to make bobbins for spinning.
