= Thomas Robert Soderstrom =

American agrostologist

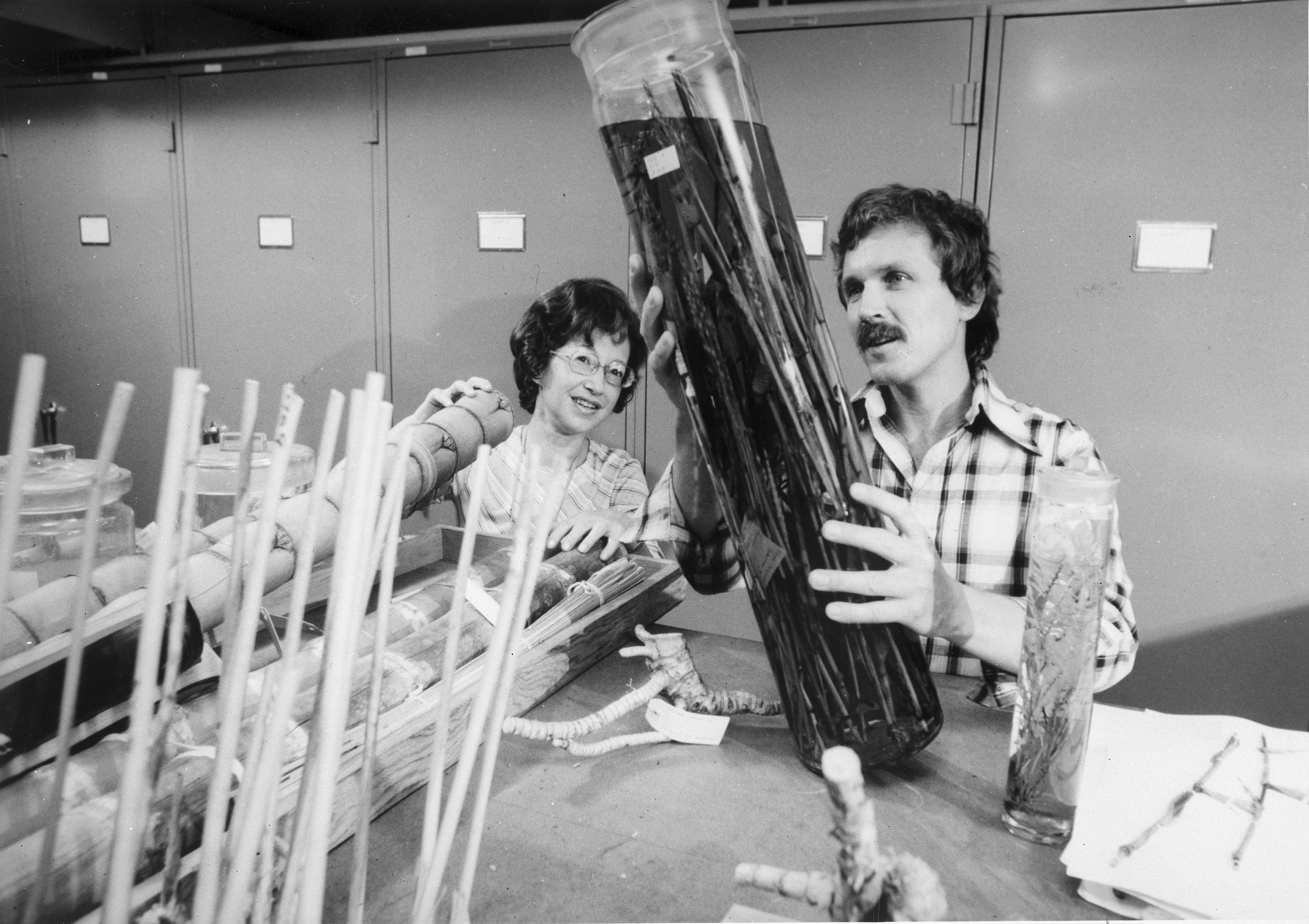
Cleofe Calderon and Thomas Soderstrom examining bamboo samples in the National Museum of Natural History, 1977

Thomas Robert Soderstrom (9 January 1936 Chicago – 1 September 1987) was an American agrostologist. His special field of study was the grass family Gramineae or Poaceae. He was Curator of Grasses at the National Museum of Natural History in Washington, DC for some twenty years.

In 1957 Soderstrom graduated from the University of Illinois with a BSc in Biology, and enrolled at the graduate school at Yale University, earning a Master of Science in Biology the following year and a PhD in Botany 1961. He joined the National Museum in 1960 as assistant curator. He became an authority on the taxonomy and biology of bamboos, publishing about 40 titles and undertaking lecture tours in numerous countries, most notably at the 1985 International Bamboo Conference held in Puerto Rico. His field work covered parts of Latin America, Africa, and Asia. Not only was he a founder member of the Association of Tropical Biology, but was also a fellow of the Linnean Society, the American Association for the Advancement of Science, and an honorary associate of the Botanical Society of Brazil. Despite poor health he undertook the organising of the First International Grass Symposium held at the Smithsonian in July 1986. A collaborator of his was Cleofé E. Calderón (1929–2007), the Argentinian-born agrostologist.

He is commemorated in Soderstromia, Ilex soderstromii, Anthurium soderstromii, Lessingianthus soderstromii, Vriesea soderstromii, Ouratea soderstromii, Cryptochloa soderstromii, Ocellochloa soderstromii, Poa soderstromii, Raddia soderstromii.

== Some publications ==
- Soderstrom, TR; FO Zuloaga. 1989. A revision of the genus Olyra and the new segregate genus Parodiolyra (Poaceae, Bambusoideae, Olyreae). Ed. Smithsonian. pp. iv, 79
- Judziewicz, EJ; TR Soderstrom. 1989. Morphological, anatomical, and taxonomic studies in Anomochloa and Streptochaeta (Poaceae, Bambusoideae). Ed. Smithsonian. pp. iii, 52
- Soderstrom, TR; RP Ellis; EJ Judziewicz. 1989. The Phareae & Streptogyneae (Poaceae) of Sri Lanka : a morphological-anatomical study. 27 pp. 8 fig.
- Soderstrom, TR. 1987. Grass Systematics & Evolution. Ed. Smithsonian. 4to, pp. xiv, 473. ISBN 0-87474-300-1
- Zuloaga, FO; TR Soderstrom. 1985. Classification of the outlying species of New World Panicum (Poaceae: Paniceae). Ed. Smithsonian. Contrib.Botany Nº 59: pp. 1–63, 25 fig. 2 tablas
- Sendulsky, T; TR Soderstrom. 1984. Revision of the South American genus Otachyrium (Poaceae, Panicoideae). Ed. Smithsonian.
- Calderon, CE; TR Soderstrom. 1973. Morphological & anatomical considerations of the grass subfamily Bambusoideae based on the new genus Maclurolyra. Ed. Smithsonian. pp. iii, 55
- Soderstrom, TR. 1967. Taxonomic study of subgenus Podosemum & section Epicampes of Muhlenbergia (Gramineae). Ed. Smithsonian. Vol. 34, Nº 4: pp. 75–189, 14 plates
- TR Soderstrom, RP Ellis. 1987. The position of bamboo genera and allies in a system of grass classification
- TR Soderstrom, CE Calderón. 1971. Insect pollination in tropical rain forest grasses. Biotropica, 1-16 1971
- Some evolutionary trends in the Bambusoideae (Poaceae) TR Soderstrom Annals of the Missouri Botanical Garden, 15-47 1981
- Morphological and anatomical considerations of the grass subfamily Bambusoideae based on the new genus Maclurolyra CE Calderón, TR Soderstrom Smithsonian Contributions to Botany 11, 1-55 1973
- A commentary on the bamboos (Poaceae: Bambusoideae) TR Soderstrom, CE Calderon Biotropica, 161-172 1979
- The genera of Bambusoideae (Poaceae) of the American continent: keys and comments CE Calderón, TR Soderstrom Smithsonian Institution Press 1980
- Primitive forest grasses and evolution of the Bambusoideae TR Soderstrom, CE Calderón Biotropica, 141-153 1974
- Distribution patterns of neotropical bamboos TR Soderstrom, EJ Judziewicz, LG Clark Proceedings of a workshop on neotropical distribution patterns. Held, 12-16 1987
- Chromosome numbers of some Ceylon grasses FW Gould, TR Soderstrom Canadian Journal of Botany 52 (5), 1075-1090 1974
- Chromosome numbers of tropical American grasses FW Gould, TR Soderstrom American Journal of Botany, 676-683 1967
- Grass systematics and evolution: an international symposium held at the Smithsonian Institution, Washington, DC, July 27–31, 1986 TR Soderstrom International Symposium on Grass Systematics and Evolution, Smithsonian 1987
- A revision of the genus Olyra and the new segregate genus Parodiolyra (Poaceae: Bambusoideae: Olyreae) TR Soderstrom, FO Zuloaga Smithsonian contributions to botany 69, 1-79 1989
- Taxonomic study of subgenus Podosemum and section Epicampes of Muhlenbergia (Gramineae) TR Soderstrom Contrib. US Nat. Herb 34, 75-189 1967
- The woody bamboos (Poaceae: Bambuseae) of Sri Lanka: A morphological-anatomical study TR Soderstrom, RP Ellis Smithsonian contributions to Botany 72, 1-75 1988
- Classification of the outlying species of new world Panicum (Poaceae: Paniceae) FO Zuloaga, TR Soderstrom Smithsonian Contributions to Botany 59, 1-63 1985
- A guide to collecting bamboos TR Soderstrom, SM Young Annals of the Missouri Botanical Garden, 128-136 1983
- Morphological, Anatomical, and Taxonomic Studies in Anomochloa and Streptochaeta (Poaceae, Bambusoideae) EJ Judziewicz, TR Soderstrom Smithsonian institution press 1989
- Chromosome numbers of some Mexican and Colombian grasses FW Gould, TR Soderstrom Canadian Journal of Botany 48 (9), 1633-1639 1970
- Observations on a fire-adapted bamboo of the Brazilian cerrado, Actinocladum verticillatum (Poaceae: Bambusoideae) TR Soderstrom American Journal of Botany, 1200-1211 1981
- Two new genera of Brazilian bamboos related to Guadua (Poaceae: Bambusoideae: Bambuseae) TR Soderstrom, X Londoño American Journal of Botany, 27-39 1987
