= List of bamboo species =

Bamboo is a group of woody perennial plants in the true grass family Poaceae. In the tribe Bambuseae, also known as bamboo, there are 91 genera and over 1,800 species. The size of bamboo varies from small annuals to giant timber bamboo. Bamboo evolved 30 to 40 million years ago, after the Cretaceous–Paleogene extinction event.

Bamboo species can be divided into two groups: sympodial (clumping) and monopodial (running) species. Sympodial species grow from the soil in a slowly expanding tuft, while monopodial species send underground rhizomes to produce shoots several metres from the original "parent" plant.

Species	English name	Native name	Clumper/ runner/ extinct	Max. height	Max. diameter	Brief species description
Acidosasa	None	酸竹属 Suān zhú shǔ	Clumper	12.2 metres (40 ft)		Grow in south coastal China, and have sour shoots.
Acidosasa chienouensis	Powdery sour bamboo	粉酸竹 Fěn suān zhú	Runner	4.6 metres (15 ft)	19 millimetres (0.75 in)	Culm sheaths green, glabrous, shorter than internodes, yellow-brown to brown setose
Acidosasa edulis	Sweet yellow bamboo	黄甜竹	Runner	12 metres (39 ft)	51 millimetres (2.0 in)	Green glabrous culms, sheath turns brown, from green. The roots are often eaten, and are said to be delicious.
Actinocladum verticillatum		射枝竹属		4.6 metres (15 ft)	14 millimetres (0.55 in)	A one-member genus distributed in western South America and Brazil.
Alvimia		南美梨藤竹属				
Ampelocalamus		悬竹属				
Ampelocalamus scandens	Climbing bamboo	爬竹 Pá zhú	Clumper	9.1 metres (30 ft)	7.6 millimetres (0.30 in)	Hangs loosely, or is scrambling. Nodes are slightly swollen. Nearly equal branches, central branches usually smaller than culms.
Apoclada simplex		离枝竹属				A one-member genus found in the forests of southeastern Brazil.
Arthrostylidium		节柱竹属				climbing bamboos found in the New World.
Arthrostylidium angustifolium						
Arthrostylidium auriculatum						
Arthrostylidium banaoense						
Arthrostylidium canaliculatum						
Arthrostylidium chiribiquetense						
Arthrostylidium cubense						
Arthrostylidium distichum						
Arthrostylidium ecuadorense						
Arthrostylidium ekmanii						
Arthrostylidium excelsum						
Arthrostylidium farctum						
Arthrostylidium fimbriatum						
Arthrostylidium fimbrinodum						
Arthrostylidium grandifolium						
Arthrostylidium haitiense						
Arthrostylidium judziewiczii						
Arthrostylidium longiflorum						
Arthrostylidium merostachyoides						
Arthrostylidium multispicatum						
Arthrostylidium obtusatum						
Arthrostylidium pubescens						
Arthrostylidium punctulatum						
Arthrostylidium reflexum						
Arthrostylidium sarmentosum						
Arthrostylidium scandens						
Arthrostylidium schomburgkii						
Arthrostylidium simpliciusculum						
Arthrostylidium urbanii						
Arthrostylidium venezuelae						
Arthrostylidium virolinense						
Arthrostylidium youngianum						
Arundinaria		青篱竹属				New shoots grow only in spring. Many species put in this genus were later transferred to different genera.
Arundinaria appalachiana	Hill cane		Runner	1.5 metres (4 ft 11 in)	5.1 millimetres (0.20 in)	The culms have internodes that are smooth and cylindrical, but slightly tapering, sheaths are usually not shed, unusually small for bamboo
Arundinaria funghomii	None		Runner	9.1 metres (30 ft)	28 millimetres (1.1 in)	New culms are covered in gray blooms for most of first year. May be the same as Pseudosasa cantori
Arundinaria gigantea	River cane, canebrake		Runner	6.1 metres (20 ft)	25 millimetres (0.98 in)	Native to the United States. Can grow at temperatures as low as -23 °C.
Arundinaria gigantea Macon	Macon river cane		Runner	6.1 metres (20 ft)	25 millimetres (0.98 in)	Can grow at very low temperatures. Can survive at -32 °C with only minor leaf burn.
Arundinaria tecta	Switch cane		Runner	1.8 metres (5 ft 11 in)	13 millimetres (0.51 in)	Like Arundinaria gigantea, but with persistent culm sheaths; can grow in soggy soil.
Athroostachys capitata						
Atractantha						
Aulonemia						
Aulonemia queko				15 metres (49 ft)	30 millimetres (1.2 in)	
Bambusa		簕竹属				Generally tropical bamboo, usually with many branches. New shoots appear in late fall.
Bambusa arnhemica	None		Clumper	7.6 metres (25 ft)	100 millimetres (3.9 in)	On Northern Australian coasts. Deciduous during dry season. Dense clumps, thick culms, short internodes, low branches.
Bambusa balcooa	None		Clumper	18 metres (59 ft)	150 millimetres (5.9 in)	From India. Has tangled clumps which make it difficult to harvest. They are strong, and are often used in construction.
Bambusa bambos	Giant thorny		Clumper	30 metres (98 ft)	180 millimetres (7.1 in)	Fast growing, with thick walls. Lower branches are long and covered with thorns. Has edible shoots, and is used to make paper in India.
Bambusa basihirsuta	Flat bamboo	扁竹	Clumper	12 metres (39 ft)	76 millimetres (3.0 in)	Tight erect clumps
Bambusa beecheyana	Beechey bamboo	吊丝球竹	Clumper	15 metres (49 ft)	130 millimetres (5.1 in)	Culms with short internodes, covered with white powder when young, usually arch strongly, shoots often eaten.
Bambusa beecheyana var. pubescens	None	大头典竹	Clumper	15 metres (49 ft)	130 millimetres (5.1 in)	Same as regular Bambusa beecheyana, but more erect, with thicker nodual hair, and it branches lower.
Bambusa blumeana	spiny bamboo	簕竹	Clumper	18 metres (59 ft)	100 millimetres (3.9 in)	Tall thorny bamboo indigenous to India and Indonesia. Used for building material and baskets. Shoots eaten.
Bambusa boniopsis	None	妈竹 Mā zhú	Clumper	4.6 metres (15 ft)	2.5 centimetres (0.98 in)	A small green bamboo with narrow leaves. Indigenous to Hainan
Bambusa burmanica	Burmese bamboo	缅甸竹	Clumper	4.6 metres (15 ft)	2.5 centimetres (0.98 in)	Nearly solid culms, with large leaves that can be up to a foot long; dense clumps with spiky low branches.
Bambusa chungii	None	粉箪竹	Clumper	9.1 metres (30 ft)	51 millimetres (2.0 in)	Thin-walled culms are covered with white powder.
Bambusa chungii var. barbelatta	None		Clumper	6.7 metres (22 ft)	38 millimetres (1.5 in)	Light ring of hair around new culm nodes, and a loose sheath blade.
Bambusa cornigera	Bull's horn bamboo	牛角竹 Niújiǎo zhú	Clumper	11 metres (36 ft)	76 millimetres (3.0 in)	Culms are zigzag and internodes are curved.
Bambusa dissimulator	None	坭簕竹	Clumper	15 metres (49 ft)	76 millimetres (3.0 in)	A giant tropical bamboo that has tough culms with long branches.
Bambusa dissimulator Albinodia	None		Clumper	15 metres (49 ft)	76 millimetres (3.0 in)	A giant tropical bamboo that has tough culms with long branches. There are white rings above and below the nodes.
Bambusa distegia	None	料慈竹	Clumper	9.1 metres (30 ft)	100 millimetres (3.9 in)	Has green internodes, and bends slightly at the top. It also tolerates light frosts.
Bambusa dolichoclada	Long-branch bamboo	长枝竹	Clumper	20 metres (66 ft)	10 centimetres (3.9 in)	Has slightly drooping internodes, flat nodes, thick walls, and a thin layer of white powder on it.
Bambusa dolichoclada Stripe	None	条纹长枝竹	Clumper	21 metres (69 ft)	10 centimetres (3.9 in)	Has slightly drooping internodes, flat nodes, thick walls, thin creamy yellow stripes, and a thin layer of white powder on it.
Bambusa dolichomerithalla						Another name for Bambusa multiplex
Bambusa emeiensis Chrysotrichus	None	慈竹	Clumper	12 metres (39 ft)	5 centimetres (2.0 in)	Originally known as Neosinocalamus affinis, but name was later changed to Bambusa emeinsis.
Bambusa emeiensis Flavidovirens	None	慈竹	Clumper	12.5 metres (41 ft)	6.2 centimetres (2.4 in)	Originally known as Neosinocalamus affinis, but name was later changed to Bambusa emeinsis. Pale yellow with green vertical stripes
Bambusa emeiensis Viridiflavus	None	慈竹	Clumper	12.5 metres (41 ft)	7 centimetres (2.8 in)	Originally known as Neosinocalamus affinis, but name was later changed to Bambusa emeinsis. Has erect culms and yellow stripes.
Bambusa eutuldoides	None	大眼竹	Clumper	15 metres (49 ft)	50 millimetres (2.0 in)	Straight thick walled culms, with fine white stripes.
Bambusa eutuldoides Viridivittata	None	青丝黄竹	Clumper	2.8 metres (9 ft 2 in)	2.5 centimetres (0.98 in)	Yellow internodes with green stripes. Shoots have peach tones
Bambusa flexuosa	None	小�デç°�ダ竹	Clumper	7.5 metres (25 ft)	6 centimetres (2.4 in)	There is a ring of silky brown hair beneath each node, and few branches.
Bambusa fulda	None		Clumper	Unknown	Unknown	Unknown
Bambusa gibba	Mud bamboo	坭竹 Ní zhú	Clumper	7.5 metres (25 ft)	5 centimetres (2.0 in)	Side branches have soft spines. An oil can be extracted from the culms.
Bambusa glaucophylla	Malay dwarf		Clumper	4.5 metres (15 ft)	2.5 centimetres (0.98 in)	Dense bushy and easy to prune. Often sold as a decorative hedge.
Bambusa intermedia	None	绵竹	Clumper	7.5 metres (25 ft)	50 millimetres (2.0 in)	Dark green with purple stripes
Bambusa lako	Timor black		Clumper	17.5 metres (57 ft)	8.8 centimetres (3.5 in)	Deep purple almost black culms, with faint green stripes. has low branches and green leave sheaths. Closely related to Gigantochloa atroviolacea.
Bambusa lapidea	Horsehoof bamboo	油�デç°�ダ竹	Clumper	10.5 metres (34 ft)	8.8 centimetres (3.5 in)	Thick walled culms almost solid at base.
Bambusa longispiculata	None	花眉竹	Clumper	11.5 metres (38 ft)	10 centimetres (3.9 in)	Green clums with light green stripes near node rings. Open clumps, and thin walls.
Bambusa luteostriata	None		Clumper	30 feet (9.1 m)	2 inches (51 mm)	Erect with full foliage at top. Green with white stripes.
Bambusa maculata	None		Clumper	Unknown	Unknown	Splotchy canes when mature.
Bambusa malingensis	None	马岭竹	Clumper	35 feet (11 m)	2.5 inches (64 mm)	Tolerates wind well. Medium-sized, but grows taller in shade.
Bambusa membranacea	None		Clumper	70 feet (21 m)	4 inches (100 mm)	Strong growing bamboo with straight culms and loose clumps.
Bambusa multiplex	Hedge bamboo	孝顺竹	Clumper	25 feet (7.6 m)	1.5 inches (38 mm)	Every node has a large number of branches from top to bottom, hence the name hedge bamboo.
Bambusa multiplex Alphonse Karr	None		Clumper	25 feet (7.6 m)	1.5 inches (38 mm)	Every node has a large number of branches from top to bottom. The leaves are yellow with irregular green stripes.
Bambusa multiplex Fernleaf	Fernleaf bamboo		Clumper	20 feet (6.1 m)	0.5 inches (13 mm)	Have about 15 closely spaced two-rank leaves.
Bambusa multiplex Fernleaf Stripestem	Fernleaf stripestem bamboo		Clumper	12 feet (3.7 m)	0.5 inches (13 mm)	Reddish yellow culms with green stripes.
Bambusa multiplex Golden Goddess	None		Clumper	10 feet (3.0 m)	0.5 inches (13 mm)	A dwarf form of Bambusa multiplex fernleaf except with larger leaves and yellow culms.
Bambusa multiplex Goldstripe	None		Clumper	25 feet (7.6 m)	1.5 inches (38 mm)	Mature culms have a gold stripe that fades into green.
Bambusa multiplex Midori Green	Green Alphonse		Clumper	15 feet (4.6 m)	1.5 inches (38 mm)	Culms and branches are light green with dark green stripes
Bambusa multiplex Riviereorum	Chinese Goddess		Clumper	6 feet (1.8 m)	0.3 inches (7.6 mm)	Has solid culms and tiny leaves
Bambusa multiplex Silverstripe	None		Clumper	25 feet (7.6 m)	1.5 inches (38 mm)	White stripes on the leaves and many culms also have white leaves.
Bambusa multiplex Tiny Fern	None		Clumper	3 feet (0.91 m)	0.2 inches (5.1 mm)	A dwarf species with tiny leaves under 1 inch (25 mm) long.
Bambusa multiplex Tiny Fern Striped	None		Clumper	3 feet (0.91 m)	0.2 inches (5.1 mm)	A dwarf species with tiny leaves under 1 inch (25 mm) long and striped culms.
Bambusa multiplex Willowy	Wang Tsai		Clumper	10 feet (3.0 m)	0.5 inches (13 mm)	Strongly arched culms with narrow leaves.
Bambusa multiplex	'Silverstripe'		Clumper	45 feet (14 m)	1.5 inches (38 mm)	
Bambusa multiplex	'Tiny Fern'		Clumper	3 feet (0.91 m)	0.10 inches (2.5 mm)	
Bambusa mutabilis			Clumper	20 feet (6.1 m)	2.0 inches (51 mm)	
Bambusa nutans	None		Clumper	40 feet (12 m)	3 inches (76 mm)	Culms have a white ring below the nodes.
Bambusa odashimae	None	乌脚绿竹	Clumper	65 feet (20 m)	3 inches (76 mm)	Has dark green leaves and edible shoots
Bambusa odashime × B. tuldoides	None		Clumper	Unknown	Unknown	Erect with long internodes.
Bambusa oldhamii	Giant timber	绿竹	Clumper	55 feet (17 m)	4 inches (100 mm)	Has erect culms, short branches, and wide leaves.
Bambusa oliveriana	None		Clumper	45 feet (14 m)	2 inches (51 mm)	Dense clumps with thick walled, glossy green culms.
Bambusa pachinensis	None	米筛竹	Clumper	33 feet (10 m)	2.4 inches (61 mm)	Medium size with yellow culms.
Bambusa pallida	None					
Bambusa pervariabilis	None	撑篙竹	Clumper	33 feet (10 m)	2.4 inches (61 mm)	Erect, thick walled, and lower culms have branches and yellow stripes.
Bambusa pervariabilis Viridistriatus	None	花撑篙竹	Clumper	33 feet (10 m)	2.4 inches (61 mm)	New shoots are yellow with green stripes, maturing to a darker yellow with dark green stripes.
Bambusa polymorpha	None		Clumper	30 metres (98 ft)		Culms are green, covered with whitish brown hair, and become brownish green when drying
Bambusa rigida	None	硬头黄竹	Clumper	40 feet (12 m)	2.3 inches (58 mm)	Erect with long internodes. There are many branches at each node.
Bambusa rutila	None	木竹	Clumper	40 feet (12 m)	2 inches (51 mm)	Thick walls, lower culms zigzag, nodes are swollen and have white hairs.
Bambusa sinospinosa	Chinese thorny	车筒竹	Clumper	70 feet (21 m)	5 inches (130 mm)	Has many thorny branches, and small leaves.
Bambusa sinospinosa Hirose	None		Clumper	55 feet (17 m)	5 inches (130 mm)	Forms tight clumps.
Bambusa sinospinosa Clone X	None		Clumper	75 feet (23 m)	2.8 inches (71 mm)	A vigorous bamboo with extremely thick walls. Classification unknown.
Bambusa sinospinosa Nana	None		Clumper	Unknown	Unknown	Straight, strong, with yellow stripes.
Bambusa sinospinosa Polymorpha	None		Clumper	65 feet (20 m)	6 inches (150 mm)	Green culms covered with silky gray hair, and short, slender branches. Classification uncertain.
Bambusa sinospinosa Richard Waldron	None		Clumper	10 feet (3.0 m)	0.5 inches (13 mm)	Compact and erect. Classification and origin uncertain.
Bambusa stenostachya	None		Clumper	70 feet (21 m)	6 inches (150 mm)	Internodes almost solid. Culm sheaths persistent.
Bambusa textilis	Weavers bamboo	青皮竹	Clumper	40 feet (12 m)	2 inches (51 mm)	Very thin culms and tight clumps. Arches very gracefully.
Bambusa textilis Dwarf	None		Clumper	18 feet (5.5 m)	1.25 inches (32 mm)	Very thin culms, and tight clumps.
Bambusa textilis Kanapaha	None		Clumper	50 feet (15 m)	2.5 inches (64 mm)	Lower half of culms are blue and have no branches.
Bambusa textilis Maculata	None		Clumper	25 feet (7.6 m)	1 inch (25 mm)	Culms and base of new culm sheaths both have purple streaks.
Bambusa textilis Mutabilis	None		Clumper	40 feet (12 m)	2.3 inches (58 mm)	Long internodes, and persistent light blue bloom.
Bambusa textilis Scranton	None		Clumper	30 feet (9.1 m)	2 inches (51 mm)	Clumps open and branches loose.
Bambusa textilis var. albostriata	None		Clumper	40 feet (12 m)	2 inches (51 mm)	Open clumps, loose branches, and white stripes on culms
Bambusa textilis var. glabra	None	光秆青皮竹	Clumper	30 feet (9.1 m)	1 inch (25 mm)	Slender with glabrous culms and culm sheaths.
Bambusa textilis var. gracilis	None	崖州竹	Clumper	30 feet (9.1 m)	1.3 inches (33 mm)	Slender culms, nodding top, graceful leaves.
Bambusa tulda	None	俯竹	Clumper	70 feet (21 m)	4 inches (100 mm)	Solid near base, straight and thick walled.
Bambusa tulda Striata	None		Clumper	70 feet (21 m)	4 inches (100 mm)	Solid near base, straight and thick walled, striped near the base.
Bambusa tuldoides	Punting Pole	青秆竹	Clumper	55 feet (17 m)	2.3 inches (58 mm)	Forms a thick clump of thick walled culms.
Bambusa variostriata	None	吊丝箪竹	Clumper	35 feet (11 m)	3 inches (76 mm)	New, edible shoots covered in white stripes and white blooms.
Bambusa ventricosa	Buddha's Belly	佛肚竹	Clumper	55 feet (17 m)	2.3 inches (58 mm)	In the ground it has zigzag culms and branches. In pots it becomes dwarf, and has swollen internodes.
Bambusa ventricosa Golden Buddha	None		Unknown	Unknown	Unknown	Unknown
Bambusa ventricosa Kimmei	None	佛肚竹	Clumper	55 feet (17 m)	2.3 inches (58 mm)	In the ground it has zigzag culms and branches. In pots it becomes dwarf, and has swollen internodes. Has yellow culms striped with green.
Bambusa ventricosa	'Holochrysa Kimmei'		Clumper	55 feet (17 m)	2.25 inches (57 mm)	
Bambusa vulgaris	Common bamboo	龙头竹	Clumper	50 feet (15 m)	4 inches (100 mm)	Open clumps with culms spaced about a foot apart. Culms root easily.
Bambusa vulgaris Vittata	Painted bamboo	黄金间碧竹	Clumper	50 feet (15 m)	4 inches (100 mm)	Golden yellow culms with green stripes that look like paint dripping down the culm.
Bambusa vulgaris Wamin	None	大佛肚竹	Clumper	16 feet (4.9 m)	3 inches (76 mm)	Has short swollen lower green internodes.
Bambusa vulgaris Wamin Striata	None		Clumper	16 feet (4.9 m)	3 inches (76 mm)	Has short swollen lower green internodes, and is striped with dark green.
Bashania						Running bamboos that naturally exist in China
Bashania fargesii	Chinese mountain bamboo or wind break bamboo		Runner	20 feet (6.1 m)	2 inches (51 mm)	Has leaves that can be up to a foot long. Also known as Arundinaria fargesii
Bashania qingchengshanensis	None		Runner	10 feet (3.0 m)	0.9 inches (23 mm)	Spreads quickly and vigorously.
Bonia						Some authorities include this genus in Bambusa.
Bonia amplexicaulis		芸香竹		33 feet (10 m)		Slender stemmed perennial bamboo species that is distributed in China
Borinda						Mountain bamboo that grow in Bhutan, Tibet, Yunnan, and Sichuan. Most of the species in this genus start out blue.
Borinda albocerea	None		Clumper	20 feet (6.1 m)	1 inch (25 mm)	Grows in mountainous regions.
Borinda angustissima	None		Clumper	18 feet (5.5 m)	0.8 inches (20 mm)	White powder covered, arched culms that start out purple.
Borinda contracta	None		Clumper	15 feet (4.6 m)	0.8 inches (20 mm)	Bushy, clumps have many culms.
Borinda frigidorum	None		Clumper	12 feet (3.7 m)	0.7 inches (18 mm)	Culm sheaths become red, leaves are small.
Borinda fungosa	Chocolate bamboo		Clumper	20 feet (6.1 m)	1 inch (25 mm)	Grow at very high altitudes. Have flexible culms, and sweet shoots. Culms turn shiny brown in sunlight.
Borinda fungosa White cloud	None		Unknown	Unknown	Unknown	Unknown
Borinda grossa	None		Clumper	26 feet (7.9 m)	1 inch (25 mm)	Unknown
Borinda KR 5288	None		Unknown	Unknown	Unknown	Unknown
Borinda lushuiensis	None		Clumper	25 feet (7.6 m)	1.5 inches (38 mm)	Unknown
Borinda macclureana	None		Clumper	15 feet (4.6 m)	1 inch (25 mm)	On the lower surface of purple branches, the leaves are pubescent.
Borinda nujiangensis	None		Clumper	20 feet (6.1 m)	1.5 inches (38 mm)	Has small dark yellow leaves.
Borinda papyrifera	None		Clumper	25 feet (7.6 m)	2 inches (51 mm)	New culms are light blue, and as they age they become yellow with thin striae.
Borinda perlonga	None		Clumper	20 feet (6.1 m)	1.5 inches (38 mm)	Has dense light green leaves, blue culms, and long culm sheaths.
Borinda sinospinosa Muliensis (sinospinosa often abbreviated sp.)	None		Clumper	6 feet (1.8 m)	0.3 inches (7.6 mm)	Has broad deciduous leaves.
Borinda yulongshanensis	None		Clumper	Unknown	Unknown	Unknown
Brachystachyum						A synonym for Semiarundinaria
Cathariostachys						
Cathariostachys capitata						.
Cathariostachys madagascariensis	Madagascar giant bamboo					.
Cephalostachyum		空竹属				Tall, shrubby, clumping bamboo from India, China, Madagascar, Malaysia, and Indonesia.
Cephalostachyum pergracile	None	香糯竹	Clumper	30 feet (9.1 m)	2 inches (51 mm)	Erect culms with white bristly hairs.
Cephalostachyum viguieri	None					
Cephalostachyum virgatum	None	金毛空竹	Clumper	50 feet (15 m)	4 inches (100 mm)	Thin walled drooping, a bamboo that is often confused with Bambusa multiplex.
Chimonobambusa		方竹属				New shoots start in fall or winter. Sometimes with thorny nodes, and quadrangular culms.
Chimonobambusa macrophylla	Intermedia	大叶筇竹	Runner	10 feet (3.0 m)	0.5 inches (13 mm)	Internodes flat above branches, and are powdery white.
Chimonobambusa macrophylla var. macrophylla	None	大叶筇竹原变种	Runner	10 feet (3.0 m)	0.5 inches (13 mm)	Internodes are not powdery white, and leaves are less than 8 inches (200 mm) long, and 1.25 inches (32 mm) wide.
Chimonobambusa macrophylla var. leiboensis	None	雷波大叶筇竹	Runner	10 feet (3.0 m)	0.5 inches (13 mm)	Initially powdery white, but this goes away.
Chimonobambusa marmorea	Marbled bamboo	寒竹	Runner	6 feet (1.8 m)	0.5 inches (13 mm)	New shoots and leaves have a marbled texture in cream and dark purple.
Chimonobambusa marmorea Variegata	None		Runner	6 feet (1.8 m)	0.5 inches (13 mm)	New shoots and leaves have a marbled texture in cream and dark purple. Leaves also have white stripes.
Chimonobambusa marmorea	Red		Runner	8 feet (2.4 m)	0.5 inches (13 mm)	
Chimonobambusa pachystachys	Thorny bamboo	刺竹子	Runner	20 feet (6.1 m)	1 inch (25 mm)	Nodes have rings of root thorns.
Chimonobambusa quadrangularis	Square bamboo	方竹	Runner	25 feet (7.6 m)	1.5 inches (38 mm)	Culms are square and have rounded corners. Nodes have a ring of root thorns.
Chimonobambusa quadrangularis Joseph de Jussieu	None		Runner	25 feet (7.6 m)	1.5 inches (38 mm)	Culms are square, yellow, have a few green stripes, and rounded corners. Nodes have a ring of root thorns. Leaves have white stripes, and culms have green sulci.
Chimonobambusa quadrangularis Suow	None		Runner	25 feet (7.6 m)	0.5 inches (13 mm)	Culms are square, yellow, have a few green stripes, and rounded corners. Nodes have a ring of root thorns.
Chimonobambusa quadrangularis Yellow Groove	None		Runner	Unknown	Unknown	Culms are square, yellow, have a few green stripes, and rounded corners. Nodes have a ring of root thorns. Culms have yellow sulci.
Chimonobambusa quadrangularis	'Suow'		Runner	25 feet (7.6 m)	1.5 inches (38 mm)	
Chimonobambusa szechuanensis	None	八月竹	Runner	19 feet (5.8 m)	1 inch (25 mm)	Has long thick culm sheaths, and three branches per node that have deciduous leaves.
Chimonobambusa tumidissinoda	Walking stick	筇竹	Runner	20 feet (6.1 m)	1.3 inches (33 mm)	A rare bamboo with inflated nodes.
Chimonobambusa yunnanensis	Black bamboo		Runner	32 feet (9.8 m)	1 inch (25 mm)	A black bamboo with square internodes.
Chimonocalamus						used to be known as Sinarundinaria
Chimonocalamus pallens			Clumper	26 feet (7.9 m)	1.2 inches (30 mm)	
Chusquea		丘竹属				A genus of South American and Central American bamboo that usually has one main branch and several branchlets per node. There may be around 70 unclassified species in this genus.
Chusquea asymmetrica	None					vulnerable to becoming an endangered species
Chusquea andina	None		Clumper	12 feet (3.7 m)	1 inch (25 mm)	Grows at a higher altitude than any other bamboo in the genus, and has small spiky blue leaves.
Chusquea andina Blue Andes	None		Clumper	12 feet (3.7 m)	1 inch (25 mm)	Grows at a very high altitude, and has small spiky blue leaves.
Chusquea circinata	None		Clumper	22 feet (6.7 m)	1 inch (25 mm)	Dark and arching, and has whorls of small leaves. Comes from Mexico.
Chusquea circinata Chiapas	None		Clumper	Unknown	Unknown	Dark and arching, and has yellow shoots. Comes from Mexico.
Chusquea coronalis	None		Clumper	23 feet (7.0 m)	0.8 inches (20 mm)	Has little leaves on small branches that completely surround the nodes. Some believe that this is the most beautiful bamboo, and it is often planted in gardens.
Chusquea culeou Colihue		Rüngi, Kuliw.	Clumper	15 feet (4.6 m)	1 inch (25 mm)	Has many equal sized branches on each node. Comes from Chile.
Chusquea culeou Argentina	None		Clumper	15 feet (4.6 m)	1.25 inches (32 mm)	Has many large, equal sized branches on each node. Comes from Argentina.
Chusquea culeou Caña Prieta	None		Clumper	15 feet (4.6 m)	1 inch (25 mm)	Culms turn dark red, brown, and sometimes almost black.
Chusquea culeou Hillier's Form	None		Clumper	9 feet (2.7 m)	0.8 inches (20 mm)	A dwarf form of Chusquea culeou.
Chusquea culeou	'Chilean Straight'		Clumper	20 feet (6.1 m)	1.25 inches (32 mm)	
Chusquea culeou	'Scandens'		Clumper	20 feet (6.1 m)	1.25 inches (32 mm)	
Chusquea culeou	longiramea		Clumper	18 feet (5.5 m)	1 inch (25 mm)	
Chusquea culeou	'Chilean Weeping'		Clumper	20 feet (6.1 m)	1 inch (25 mm)	
Chusquea cumingii	None		Clumper	10 feet (3.0 m)	0.8 inches (20 mm)	Has many tiny, stiff, sharp leaves.
Chusquea delicatula	None		Unknown	12 feet (3.7 m)	0.5 inches (13 mm)	Has very small leaves and is native to Peru.
Chusquea elata	None					
Chusquea elegans	None					
Chusquea falcata	None					
Chusquea foliosa	None		Clumper	20 feet (6.1 m)	1.5 inches (38 mm)	Golden culms with green nodes and thin dropping leaves.
Chusquea galeottiana	None		Clumper	20 feet (6.1 m)	0.8 inches (20 mm)	Arches, and comes from southern Mexico.
Chusquea gigantea	None		Clumper	25 feet (7.6 m)	1.5 inches (38 mm)	has red shoots, green culms, many branches per node, and forms open clumps.
Chusquea glomerata	None					a synonym for Athroostachys capitata
Chusquea glauca	None		Clumper	10 feet (3.0 m)	0.5 inches (13 mm)	Has very large leaves.
Chusquea liebmannii	None		Clumper	33 feet (10 m)	1 inch (25 mm)	Culms arch strongly. Nodes have spine like roots.
Chusquea leonardiorum	None					
Chusquea loxensis	None					
Chusquea maclurei	None					
Chusquea macrostachya	None		Clumper	15 feet (4.6 m)	0.5 inches (13 mm)	Grows in Chile at elevations up to 3,000 feet (910 m).
Chusquea mimosa subsp. australis	None		Clumper	15 feet (4.6 m)	1 inch (25 mm)	Stiff, red culms with small leaves. Native to Brazil.
Chusquea montana	None		Clumper	6 feet (1.8 m)	0.3 inches (7.6 mm)	Has swollen nodes.
Chusquea muelleri	None		Clumper	6 feet (1.8 m)	0.2 inches (5.1 mm)	Culms delicate, 2-3 branches per node.
Chusquea nana	None					
Chusquea pittieri	None		Clumper	25 feet (7.6 m)	2 inches (51 mm)	Has arching culms, and thorny nodes.
Chusquea simpliciflora	None		Clumper	50 feet (15 m)	0.4 inches (10 mm)	Climbs over other plants, and is a vining species.
Chusquea simpliciflora Chiconquiaco	None		Clumper	10 feet (3.0 m)	0.5 inches (13 mm)	Has small leaves, and is a vining species.
Chusquea simpliciflora Las Vigas	None		Clumper	8 feet (2.4 m)	0.5 inches (13 mm)	Has large leaves, red shoots, and is a vining species.
Chusquea subtilis	None		Clumper	20 feet (6.1 m)	1 inch (25 mm)	Has very fine leaves, and grows at high elevations in Costa Rica.
Chusquea sulcata	None		Clumper	15 feet (4.6 m)	0.8 inches (20 mm)	Erect golden culms have fine leaves and many branches.
Chusquea tomentosa	None		Clumper	25 feet (7.6 m)	1 inch (25 mm)	Has long dark green leaves.
Chusquea uliginosa	None		Clumper	15 feet (4.6 m)	0.5 inches (13 mm)	Grows at the edge of wetlands in Chile.
Chusquea valdiviensis	None		Clumper	25 feet (7.6 m)	1 inch (25 mm)	Culms can climb to 40 feet (12 m) with help.
Chusquea virgata	None		Clumper	25 feet (7.6 m)	0.8 inches (20 mm)	Has swollen nodes. Culms are speckled with purple.
Chusquea sp.	'Nigricans'		Clumper	10 feet (3.0 m)	0.4 inches (10 mm)	
Colanthelia						
Davidsea attenuata		戴维斯竹属				
Decaryochloa diadelpha						
Dendrocalamus		牡竹属				Huge tropical clumping bamboo.
Dendrocalamus asper	None	马来甜龙竹	Clumper	100 feet (30 m)	8 inches (200 mm)	Shoots are large and often eaten.
Dendrocalamus asper Betung Hitam	None		Clumper	100 feet (30 m)	8 inches (200 mm)	Has black culms, and is rare.
Dendrocalamus brandisii	None	勃氏甜龙竹	Clumper	100 feet (30 m)	8 inches (200 mm)	Thick walled culms with shoots that are edible raw.
Dendrocalamus brandisii Black	None		Clumper	40 feet (12 m)	8 inches (200 mm)	A fast-growing black culmed bamboo.
Dendrocalamus brandisii variegated	None		Clumper	100 feet (30 m)	12 inches (300 mm)	Similar to Dendrocalamus brandisii but with variegated leaves and wider culms.
Dendrocalamus calostachyus	None	美穗龙竹	Clumper	70 feet (21 m)	5 inches (130 mm)	Sturdy, often used for construction.
Dendrocalamus giganteus	Dragon bamboo	龙竹	Clumper	100 feet (30 m)	12 inches (300 mm)	Leaves can be up to 20 inches (510 mm) long, and 4 inches (100 mm) wide.
Dendrocalamus giganteus Quail Clone	None		Clumper	100 feet (30 m)	12 inches (300 mm)	A cultivar of Dendrocalamus giganteus man-made at Quail Botanical Gardens in California, United States
Dendrocalamus giganteus variegated	None		Clumper	Unknown	Unknown	Leaves can be up to 20 inches (510 mm) long, and 4 inches (100 mm) wide and are variegated. Does not yet have a real scientific name.
Dendrocalamus hamiltonii	None	版纳甜龙竹	Clumper	80 feet (24 m)	7 inches (180 mm)	Leaves can be up to 15 inches (380 mm) long, grows in the Himalayas.
Dendrocalamus jianshuiensis	None	建水龙竹	Clumper	55 feet (17 m)	5 inches (130 mm)	Has fimbriate culm sheath ligule.
Dendrocalamus jianshuiensis variegated	None		Clumper	55 feet (17 m)	5 inches (130 mm)	Like Dendrocalamus jianshuiensis but with variegated leaves. Currently has no scientific name.
Dendrocalamus latiflorus	None	麻竹	Clumper	65 feet (20 m)	8 inches (200 mm)	From southern China, has large dark green leaves 10–16 inches (250–410 mm) long, and 3–4 inches (76–102 mm) wide.
Dendrocalamus latiflorus Mei-nung	None	美浓麻竹	Clumper	65 feet (20 m)	8 inches (200 mm)	Like Dendrocalamus latiflorus but with light green culms and dark green culm stripes.
Dendrocalamus latiflorus Subconvex	None	葫芦麻竹	Clumper	33 feet (10 m)	4.7 inches (120 mm)	Has pear shaped culms, and is one of the shortest species in the entire genus.
Dendrocalamus longispathus	None				10 centimetres (3.9 in)	
Dendrocalamus maroochy	None		Clumper	33 feet (10 m)	8 inches (200 mm)	Arching bamboo with yellow culms. It has only recently been added to the world's bamboo inventory.
Dendrocalamus minor	None	吊丝竹	Clumper	25 feet (7.6 m)	2 inches (51 mm)	Has arching culms, and brown rings on culm sheaths near the base of the culm.
Dendrocalamus minor var. amoenus	None	花吊丝竹	Clumper	25 feet (7.6 m)	2 inches (51 mm)	Has pale yellow culms with green stripes.
Dendrocalamus minor var. minor	None	吊丝竹原变种	Clumper	39 feet (12 m)	3 inches (76 mm)	Has green internodes.
Dendrocalamus sikkimensis	None	锡金龙竹	Clumper	65 feet (20 m)	8 inches (200 mm)	Culms brownish red, and culm sheaths have a velvet like texture.
Dendrocalamus sinicus	None	歪脚龙竹	Clumper	120 feet (37 m)	12 inches (300 mm)	Internodes near the base are shorter, and all internodes have short yellow hair.
Dendrocalamus sp. Parker's Giant	None		Clumper	80 feet (24 m)	12 inches (300 mm)	An unidentified giant timber bamboo found by Jim Parker in Hawaii, U.S.A.
Dendrocalamus strictus	Male bamboo, solid bamboo, Calcutta bamboo	牡竹	Clumper	60 feet (18 m)	5 inches (130 mm)	Most common bamboo in India. Culms are sometimes solid. Unlike most bamboo, it flowers frequently. Often used for fishing rods.
Dendrocalamus validus	None		Clumper	45 feet (14 m)	4 inches (100 mm)	Erect culms with convex internodes.
Dendrocalamus xishuangbannaensis			Clumper?	150 feet (46 m)	14 inches (360 mm)	Found in southern Yunnan, China
Dendrocalamus yunnanicus	Yunnan dragon bamboo	云南龙竹	Clumper	80 feet (24 m)	7 inches (180 mm)	Pale green. Grows in Yunnan and Vietnam.
Dinochloa						Clumping, clinging bamboo that grows native in Burma through the Philippines. They have fleshy fruits, the size of a golf ball or smaller.
Dinochloa malayana	None		Clumper	30 feet (9.1 m)	0.5 inches (13 mm)	Has large shiny leaves, rough culms, and hairy culm sheaths.
Dinochloa scandens	None		Clumper	30 feet (9.1 m)	0.5 inches (13 mm)	Has black culms and ovate leaves.
Drepanostachyum		镰序竹属				Clumping mountain bamboo that has many equal branches.
Drepanostachyum falcatum	None		Clumper	30 feet (9.1 m)	1.1 inches (28 mm)	Unknown
Drepanostachyum falcatum var. sengteeanum	None		Clumper	30 feet (9.1 m)	1.1 inches (28 mm)	Has bright green culms and small paper thin leaves.
Drepanostachyum khasianum	Khasia bamboo		Clumper	12 feet (3.7 m)	0.5 inches (13 mm)	Culms are dark green. New culms have a white powder that makes them look like they are blue.
Drepanostachyum microphyllum	None		Clumper	Unknown	Unknown	Has bright green leaves. Can have up to 70 branches per node.
Drepanostachyum sengteeanum			Clumper	15 feet (4.6 m)	0.75 inches (19 mm)	
Elytrostachys						
Eremitis						
Eremitis monothalamia	None		Unknown	Unknown	Unknown	A synonym for Eremitis parviflora
Eremitis parviflora	None		Unknown	Unknown	Unknown	Native to eastern Brazil.
Eremocaulon						
Fargesia		箭竹属				Clumping bamboo from southwest China. Small-medium-sized. Tolerant to cold, but not to heat. Flowers are shaped similar to toothbrushes.
Fargesia adpressa	None	贴毛箭竹	Clumper	18 feet (5.5 m)	1.3 inches (33 mm)	Has purplish-green culms, and open clumps.
Fargesia apircirubens	Red tipped bamboo		Clumper	16 feet (4.9 m)	0.8 inches (20 mm)	Grows at elevations above 6,000 feet (1,800 m) above sea level.
Fargesia apircirubens White Dragon	None		Clumper	8 feet (2.4 m)	0.5 inches (13 mm)	Same as above but with variegated white leaves in spring that later fade to green.
Fargesia communis	None	马亨箭竹	Clumper	24 feet (7.3 m)	1 inch (25 mm)	Persistent pale red culm sheaths that are much longer than internodes.
Fargesia denudata	None	缺苞箭竹	Clumper	16 feet (4.9 m)	0.5 inches (13 mm)	Has small delicate leaves. Culms branch out after first winter.
Fargesia denudata Xian 1	None		Clumper	11 feet (3.4 m)	0.5 inches (13 mm)	Has yellow arching culms and fine small leaves.
Fargesia dracocephala	None	龙头箭竹	Clumper	9.8 feet (3.0 m)	0.5 inches (13 mm)	One of the main food species for the giant panda. Pale red-brown culm sheaths. Culms initially powdery. Shoots come up early in the season.
Fargesia dracocephala	'Gold Stem'		Clumper	12 feet (3.7 m)	0.5 inches (13 mm)	
Fargesia dracocephala	'Rufa' 'Gansu 95-1'		Clumper	15 feet (4.6 m)	0.5 inches (13 mm)	Sometime confused with Fargesia rufa, which is a different species.
Fargesia murielae	None	神农箭竹	Clumper	16.5 feet (5.0 m)	0.5 inches (13 mm)	Grows new shoots in early May.
Fargesia murielae Bimbo	None		Clumper	5 inches (130 mm)	Unknown	Unusually short
Fargesia murieliae Harewood	None		Clumper	10 feet (3.0 m)	Unknown	Dark green leaves, and red-brown culm sheaths
Fargesia murieliae Jonny's Giant	None		Clumper	13 feet (4.0 m)	Unknown	Unknown
Fargesia murieliae Jumbo Jet	None		Clumper	10 feet (3.0 m)	Unknown	Gold-green culms that arch.
Fargesia murieliae Simba	None		Clumper	6.5 feet (2.0 m)	0.4 inches (10 mm)	Pea colored culms.
Fargesia murieliae SABE 939	None		Clumper	15 feet (4.6 m)	0.5 inches (13 mm)	Unknown
Fargesia murieliae Vampire	None		Clumper	12 feet (3.7 m)	0.5 inches (13 mm)	Upright with bright red culms and dark green leaves.
Fargesia murieliae	None		Clumper / Extinct	15 feet (4.6 m)	0.5 inches (13 mm)	A man-made cultivar, made in 1907, that lasted until the 1980s, when it was lost to cultivation.
Fargesia murieliae	Umbrella bamboo		Clumper	15 feet (4.6 m)	0.5 inches (13 mm)	
Fargesia nitida	Fountain bamboo	华西箭竹	Clumper	12 feet (3.7 m)	0.5 inches (13 mm)	Dark gray, sometimes even black culms. Culm sheaths have orange stripes.
Fargesia nitida	'Jiuzhaigou'		Clumper	12 feet (3.7 m)	0.5 inches (13 mm)	
Fargesia robusta	'Pingwu'		Clumper	15 feet (4.6 m)	0.8 inches (20 mm)	
Fargesia rufa		青川箭	Clumper			
Ferrocalamus strictus	Iron bamboo					A one-member genus endemic to Yunnan, China's southern areas.
Filgueirasia						
Filgueirasia arenicola						
Filgueirasia cannavieira						
Gaoligongshania megalothyrsa			Clumper	6 feet (1.8 m)	0.4 inches (10 mm)	
Gelidocalamus fangianus			Runner	10 feet (3.0 m)	0.5 inches (13 mm)	
Gigantochloa						
Gigantochloa achmadii						
Gigantochloa albociliata			Clumper	30 feet (9.1 m)	2 inches (51 mm)	
Gigantochloa albopilosa						
Gigantochloa albovestita						
Gigantochloa andamanica						
Gigantochloa apus	BAMBU TALI		Clumper	65 feet (20 m)	4 inches (100 mm)	
Gigantochloa aspera						
Gigantochloa atter						
Gigantochloa atroviolacea	Tropical black bamboo		Clumper	50 feet (15 m)	3.5 inches (89 mm)	Deep purple almost black culms, with faint green stripes. has low branches and green leave sheaths. Closely related to Bambusa lako.
Gigantochloa auriculata						
Gigantochloa aya						
Gigantochloa baliana						
Gigantochloa balui						
Gigantochloa calcicola						
Gigantochloa cochinchinensis						
Gigantochloa compressa						
Gigantochloa densa						
Gigantochloa dinhensis						
Gigantochloa felix						
Gigantochloa hasskarliana						
Gigantochloa hayatae						
Gigantochloa heteroclada						
Gigantochloa heterostachya						
Gigantochloa hirtinoda						
Gigantochloa holttumiana						
Gigantochloa hosseusii						
Gigantochloa kachinensis						
Gigantochloa kathaensis						
Gigantochloa kuring						
Gigantochloa kurzii						
Gigantochloa latifolia						
Gigantochloa latispiculata						
Gigantochloa levis						
Gigantochloa ligulata						
Gigantochloa longiprophylla						
Gigantochloa luteostriata						
Gigantochloa macrostachya						
Gigantochloa magentea						
Gigantochloa maxima						
Gigantochloa membranoidea						
Gigantochloa merrilliana						
Gigantochloa mogaungensis						
Gigantochloa multiculmis						
Gigantochloa nigrociliata						
Gigantochloa novoguineensis						
Gigantochloa papyracea						
Gigantochloa parviflora						
Gigantochloa parvifolia						
Gigantochloa poilanei						
Gigantochloa pruriens						
Gigantochloa pseudoarundinacea						
Gigantochloa pubinervis						
Gigantochloa pubipetiolata						
Gigantochloa ridleyi						
Gigantochloa robusta						
Gigantochloa rostrata						
Gigantochloa scortechinii						
Gigantochloa scribneriana						
Gigantochloa serik						
Gigantochloa sinuata						
Gigantochloa stocksii						
Gigantochloa tekserah						
Gigantochloa tenuispiculata						
Gigantochloa thoi						
Gigantochloa tomentosa						
Gigantochloa toungooensis						
Gigantochloa velutina						
Gigantochloa verticillata						
Gigantochloa vietnamica						
Gigantochloa vinhphuica						
Gigantochloa wallichiana						
Gigantochloa wanet						
Gigantochloa wrayi						
Gigantochloa wunthoensis						
Gigantochloa yunzalinensis						
Glaziophyton mirabile						
Greslania						
Guadua						
Guadua paniculata				10 metres (33 ft)	70 millimetres (2.8 in)	
Guaduella						
Hickelia madagascariensis						
Himalayacalamus						often confused with Drepanostachyum. Himalayacalamus species have one dominant branch; Drepanostachyum have many equal branches.
Himalayacalamus asper	(formerly NMC: Neo. microphyllus)		Clumper	20 feet (6.1 m)	1.5 inches (38 mm)	
Himalayacalamus cupreus			Clumper	20 feet (6.1 m)	1.25 inches (32 mm)	
Himalayacalamus falconeri			Clumper	30 feet (9.1 m)	2.0 inches (51 mm)	
Himalayacalamus falconeri	'Damarapa' (formerly Drepanostachum hookerianum), candy stripe		Clumper	30 feet (9.1 m)	2.0 inches (51 mm)	
Himalayacalamus hookerianus	Blue bamboo, Teague's blue (formerly Drepanostachyum falcatum)		Clumper	20 feet (6.1 m)	2.0 inches (51 mm)	
Himalayacalamus hookerianus	'Falcatus'		Clumper	15 feet (4.6 m)	1 inch (25 mm)	
Himalayacalamus porcatus			Clumper	20 feet (6.1 m)	1.25 inches (32 mm)	
Hibanobambusa tranquillans	'Shiroshima'		Runner	15 feet (4.6 m)	0.35 inches (8.9 mm)	Some authorities consider it an intergeneric hybrid between Phillostachys nigra var. henonsis and Sasa veitchii f. tyugokensis.
Hitchcockella baronii		脊颖竹属				
Holttumochloa						
Indocalamus latifolius			Runner	6 feet (1.8 m)	0.3 inches (7.6 mm)	
Indocalamus longiauritus			Runner	12 feet (3.7 m)	0.65 inches (17 mm)	
Indocalamus tessellatus	(Sasa tessellata)		Runner	7 feet (2.1 m)	0.5 inches (13 mm)	
Indosasa crassifolia			Runner	15 feet (4.6 m)	1 inch (25 mm)	
Kinabaluchloa						
Leptocanna chinensis						Regarded by some authorities as a synonym for Schizostachyum chinense
Melocalamus						
Melocanna		梨竹属				
Melocanna baccifera	Chittagong forest bamboo				15 centimetres (5.9 in)	
Menstruocalamus						
Monocladus						This genus is now included in Bonia.
Myriocladus						
Nastus						
Neurolepis						A synonym for Chusquea
Ochlandra strulata		群蕊竹属	Runner	20 feet (6.1 m)	1 inch (25 mm)	
Oligostachyum						This genus is sometimes included in Arundinaria.
Olmeca						
Otatea acuminata	Aztecorum, Mexican weeping		Clumper	20 feet (6.1 m)	0.5 inches (13 mm)	
Perrierbambus						
Phyllostachys						
Phyllostachys acuta			Runner	26 feet (7.9 m)	2.5 inches (64 mm)	
Phyllostachys angusta	Stone bamboo		Runner	22 feet (6.7 m)	1.25 inches (32 mm)	
Phyllostachys arcana			Runner	27 feet (8.2 m)	1.25 inches (32 mm)	
Phyllostachys atrovaginata	(congesta) incense bamboo		Runner	25 feet (7.6 m)	2.25 inches (57 mm)	
Phyllostachys aurea	Hedge bamboo, golden		Runner	30 feet (9.1 m)	2.0 inches (51 mm)	
Phyllostachys aurea	'Flavescens-inversa'		Runner	30 feet (9.1 m)	2.0 inches (51 mm)	
Phyllostachys aurea	'Holochrysa', true gold		Runner	27 feet (8.2 m)	1.75 inches (44 mm)	
Phyllostachys aurea	'Koi'		Runner	30 feet (9.1 m)	2.0 inches (51 mm)	
Phyllostachys aureosulcata	Yellow groove		Runner	45 feet (14 m)	3 inches (76 mm)	
Phyllostachys aureosulcata	'Alata'		Runner	45 feet (14 m)	3 inches (76 mm)	
Phyllostachys aureosulcata	'Harbin' inversa		Runner	26 feet (7.9 m)	1.5 inches (38 mm)	
Phyllostachys aureosulcata	'Harbin'		Runner	26 feet (7.9 m)	1.5 inches (38 mm)	
Phyllostachys aureosulcata	'Spectabilis'		Runner	26 feet (7.9 m)	1.25 inches (32 mm)	
Phyllostachys aureosulcata	'Lama Temple'		Runner	26 feet (7.9 m)	1.25 inches (32 mm)	
Phyllostachys bambusoides	Madake		Runner	72 feet (22 m)	6 inches (150 mm)	
Phyllostachys bambusoides	Holochrysa, 'All Gold'		Runner	35 feet (11 m)	2.5 inches (64 mm)	
Phyllostachys bambusoides	'Aureostriata'		Runner	35 feet (11 m)	2.5 inches (64 mm)	
Phyllostachys bambusoides	'Castillon'		Runner	35 feet (11 m)	2.0 inches (51 mm)	
Phyllostachys bambusoides	'Castillon Inversa'		Runner	35 feet (11 m)	2.0 inches (51 mm)	
Phyllostachys bambusoides	'Slender Crookstem'		Runner	50 feet (15 m)	5 inches (130 mm)	
Phyllostachys bambusoides	'Subvariegata'		Runner	48 feet (15 m)	3 inches (76 mm)	
Phyllostachys bissetii			Runner	23 feet (7.0 m)	1 inch (25 mm)	
Phyllostachys decora			Runner	24 feet (7.3 m)	1.25 inches (32 mm)	
Phyllostachys densiflorum			Runner	20 feet (6.1 m)	1.5 inches (38 mm)	
Phyllostachys dulcis			Runner	40 feet (12 m)	3 inches (76 mm)	
Phyllostachys edulis	'Pubescens' (China), moso		Runner	80 feet (24 m)	6 inches (150 mm)	AKA P. heterocycla, P. pubescens, P. heterocycla, P. mitis, Bambusa edulis, B. heterocycla
Phyllostachys flexuosa			Runner	31 feet (9.4 m)	2.75 inches (70 mm)	
Phyllostachys glauca			Runner	70 feet (21 m)	5 inches (130 mm)	
Phyllostachys heteroclada	'Solid Stem'		Runner	20 feet (6.1 m)	1 inch (25 mm)	
Phyllostachys heteroclada	'Straight Stem', water bamboo		Runner	33 feet (10 m)	1.5 inches (38 mm)	
Phyllostachys humilis			Runner	20 feet (6.1 m)	1 inch (25 mm)	
Phyllostachys iridescens			Runner	36 feet (11 m)	2.75 inches (70 mm)	
Phyllostachys meyeri			Runner	33 feet (10 m)	2.0 inches (51 mm)	
Phyllostachys nidularia			Runner	33 feet (10 m)	1.5 inches (38 mm)	
Phyllostachys nigra	Black bamboo		Runner	30 feet (9.1 m)	2.25 inches (57 mm)	
Phyllostachys nigra	'Daikokuchiku', giant black		Runner	50 feet (15 m)	3.35 inches (85 mm)	
Phyllostachys nigra	'Bory', leopard bamboo		Runner	50 feet (15 m)	3 inches (76 mm)	
Phyllostachys nigra	'Henon'		Runner	65 feet (20 m)	5 inches (130 mm)	
Phyllostachys nigra	'Megurochiku'		Runner	54 feet (16 m)	3 inches (76 mm)	
Phyllostachys nigra	'Shimadake'		Runner	30 feet (9.1 m)	2.75 inches (70 mm)	
Phyllostachys nuda	Nude Sheath Bamboo		Runner	34 feet (10 m)	1.75 inches (44 mm)	
Phyllostachys parvifolia	Anji golden bamboo		Runner	39 feet (12 m)	3.9 inches (99 mm)	
Phyllostachys rubromarginata			Runner	55 feet (17 m)	3.5 inches (89 mm)	
Phyllostachys violascens			Runner	50 feet (15 m)	3 inches (76 mm)	
Phyllostachys virella	Dongyang Green Skin Bamboo		Runner	30 feet (9.1 m)	2 inches (51 mm)	
Phyllostachys viridiglaucescens			Runner	35 feet (11 m)	2.0 inches (51 mm)	
Phyllostachys viridis	'Houzeau'		Runner	45 feet (14 m)	3 inches (76 mm)	
Phyllostachys viridis	'Robert Young'		Runner	40 feet (12 m)	3 inches (76 mm)	
Phyllostachys vivax	Chinese timber bamboo		Runner	70 feet (21 m)	5 inches (130 mm)	
Phyllostachys vivax	'Aureocaulis'		Runner	70 feet (21 m)	5 inches (130 mm)	
Pleioblastus						
Pleioblastus argenteostriatus			Runner	3 feet (0.91 m)	0.25 inches (6.4 mm)	
Pleioblastus chino	'Kimmei'		Runner	12 feet (3.7 m)	0.6 inches (15 mm)	
Pleioblastus chino	'Murakamianus'		Runner	6 feet (1.8 m)	0.3 inches (7.6 mm)	
Pleioblastus chino	'Vaginatus Variegatus'		Runner	6 feet (1.8 m)	0.5 inches (13 mm)	
Pleioblastus distichus			Runner	2 feet (0.61 m)	0.10 inches (2.5 mm)	
Pleioblastus distichus	'Whitestripe'		Runner	2 feet (0.61 m)	0.10 inches (2.5 mm)	
Pleioblastus distichus	'Mini'		Runner	1 foot (0.30 m)	0.10 inches (2.5 mm)	
Pleioblastus fortunei	Dwarf white-stripe		Runner	4 feet (1.2 m)	0.15 inches (3.8 mm)	
Pleioblastus gramineus			Runner	12 feet (3.7 m)	0.5 inches (13 mm)	
Pleioblastus humilis	'Albovariegatus'		Runner	4 feet (1.2 m)	0.10 inches (2.5 mm)	
Pleioblastus hindsii	'Yasui'		Runner	18 feet (5.5 m)	1.5 inches (38 mm)	
Pleioblastus humilis			Runner	4 feet (1.2 m)	0.10 inches (2.5 mm)	
Pleioblastus linearis			Runner	15 feet (4.6 m)	0.75 inches (19 mm)	
Pleioblastus simonii			Runner	20 feet (6.1 m)	1 inch (25 mm)	
Pleioblastus virens			Runner	10 feet (3.0 m)	0.75 inches (19 mm)	
Pleioblastus viridistriatus	Dwarf greenstripe		Runner	4 feet (1.2 m)	0.25 inches (6.4 mm)	
Pleioblastus viridistriatus	'Chrysophyllus'		Runner	4 feet (1.2 m)	0.25 inches (6.4 mm)	
Pseudosasa						
Pseudosasa amabilis	Tonkin cane, formerly known as Arundinaria amabilis		Runner	50 feet (15 m)	2.5 inches (64 mm)	Often used for fishing rods.
Pseudosasa japonica	Arrow bamboo	Unknown	Running	18 feet (5.5 m)	0.75 inches (19 mm)	Grows densely
Pseudosasa japonica	'Pleioblastoides'	矢竹	Runner	18 feet (5.5 m)	0.75 inches (19 mm)	
Pseudosasa japonica var. tsutsumiana			Runner	10 feet (3.0 m)	0.75 inches (19 mm)	
Pseudosasa usawai			Runner	15 feet (4.6 m)	0.75 inches (19 mm)	
Pseudostachyum polymorphum	thin-walled bamboo					
Puelia						
Qiongzhuea		方竹属				A synonym for Chimonobambusa
Racemobambos						
Rhipidocladum						
Rhipidocladum harmonicum				20 metres (66 ft)	60 millimetres (2.4 in)	
Sasa						
Sasa borealis			Runner	5 feet (1.5 m)	0.15 inches (3.8 mm)	
Sasa kurilensis	'Simofuri', fallen snow		Runner	6 feet (1.8 m)	0.5 inches (13 mm)	
Sasa nagimontana	(muroi)		Runner	6 feet (1.8 m)	0.2 inches (5.1 mm)	
Sasa oshidensis			Runner	6 feet (1.8 m)	0.25 inches (6.4 mm)	
Sasa palmata	'Nebulosa' broadleaf bamboo		Runner	15 feet (4.6 m)	0.5 inches (13 mm)	
Sasa tsuboiana			Runner	6 feet (1.8 m)	0.25 inches (6.4 mm)	
Sasa veitchii	Kuma-zasa		Runner	3 feet (0.91 m)	0.25 inches (6.4 mm)	
Sasa veitchii	'Minor'		Runner	2 feet (0.61 m)	0.1 inches (2.5 mm)	
Sasaella albostriata			Runner	6 feet (1.8 m)	0.375 inches (9.5 mm)	
Sasaella glabra	aureostriata		Runner	3 feet (0.91 m)	0.20 inches (5.1 mm)	
Sasaella masamuneana			Runner	6 feet (1.8 m)	0.25 inches (6.4 mm)	
Sasaella masamuneana	'Albostriata'		Runner	6 feet (1.8 m)	0.25 inches (6.4 mm)	
Sasaella ramosa			Runner	6 feet (1.8 m)	0.25 inches (6.4 mm)	
Schizostachyum						
Schizostachyum brachycladum				15 metres (49 ft)	8 centimetres (3.1 in)	Traditionally used to make the Saluang, an Indonesian flute.
Schizostachyum chinense						
Schizostachyum glaucifolium	Polynesian ʻohe					
Schizostachyum lima	Tagalog: Anos	l				
Semiarundinaria						Culm leaves hang attached to the middle of their base for some time.
Semiarundinaria densiflora	None		Runner	20 feet (6.1 m)	1 inch (25 mm)	Young culms are hairy. The leaves are about 7 inches (180 mm) long and 1 inch (25 mm) wide.
Semiarundinaria densiflora var. villosum	None		Runner	20 feet (6.1 m)	1 inch (25 mm)	Base of culm sheaths densely hairy. The leaves are about 7 inches (180 mm) long and 1 inch (25 mm) wide.
Semiarundinaria fastuosa	Temple bamboo		Runner	30 feet (9.1 m)	1.5 inches (38 mm)	
Semiarundinaria fortis			Runner	12 feet (3.7 m)	1.5 inches (38 mm)	
Semiarundinaria makinoi			Runner	15 feet (4.6 m)	0.33 inches (8.4 mm)	
Semiarundinaria sp.	'Maruyamana'		Runner	15 feet (4.6 m)	0.75 inches (19 mm)	
Semiarundinaria okuboi			Runner	25 feet (7.6 m)	1.5 inches (38 mm)	
Semiarundinaria yamadori			Runner	15 feet (4.6 m)	0.75 inches (19 mm)	
Semiarundinaria yashadake	'Kimmei'		Runner	15 feet (4.6 m)	1 inch (25 mm)	
Semiarundinaria yashadake	'Kimmei Holochrysa'		Runner	25 feet (7.6 m)	1.5 inches (38 mm)	
Semiarundinaria yashadake	'Kimmei Inversa'		Runner	15 feet (4.6 m)	0.9 inches (23 mm)	
Semiarundinaria yoshi	matsumurae		Runner	15 feet (4.6 m)	0.75 inches (19 mm)	
Shibataea		倭竹属				
Shibataea kumasaca	Ruscus Bamboo Or Ruscus-Leaf Bamboo		Runner	7 feet (2.1 m)	0.25 inches (6.4 mm)	Some authorities prefer the name Shibataea kumasasa
Shibataea lancifolia			Runner	7 feet (2.1 m)	0.25 inches (6.4 mm)	
Sinobambusa		唐竹属				
Sinobambusa tootsik	albostriata		Runner	20 feet (6.1 m)	1.5 inches (38 mm)	
Sphaerobambos						
Teinostachyum						A synonym for Schizostachyum
Temburongia						
Thamnocalamus						
Thamnocalamus aristatus			Clumper	20 feet (6.1 m)	0.5 inches (13 mm)	
Thamnocalamus tessellatus			Clumper	16 feet (4.9 m)	1 inch (25 mm)	
Thyrsostachys						
Thyrsostachys siamensis	Monastery bamboo, Umbrella bamboo, Thai umbrella bamboo, or Umbrella-handle bamboo		Runner	13 metres (43 ft)	8 centimetres (3.1 in)	
Valiha						
Valiha diffusa				32 feet (9.8 m)	4 inches (100 mm)	
Valiha perrieri						
Yushania		玉山竹属				
Yushania alpina			Clumper	64 feet (20 m)	5 inches (130 mm)	Many synonyms, common name African alpine bamboo
Yushania anceps			Clumper	12 feet (3.7 m)	0.75 inches (19 mm)	
Yushania anceps	'Pitt White'		Clumper	12 feet (3.7 m)	0.75 inches (19 mm)	
Yushania chungii			Clumper	12 feet (3.7 m)	0.3 inches (7.6 mm)	
Yushania maling			Clumper	15 feet (4.6 m)	0.75 inches (19 mm)	
Yushania megalothyrsa						A synonym for Gaoligongshania megalothyrsa
