= Arthrostylidium =

Scientific classification
- Kingdom: Plantae
- Clade: Tracheophytes
- Clade: Angiosperms
- Clade: Monocots
- Clade: Commelinids
- Order: Poales
- Family: Poaceae
- Subfamily: Bambusoideae
- Tribe: Bambuseae
- Subtribe: Arthrostylidiinae
- Genus: Arthrostylidium; Rupr.

Type species
- Arthrostylidium cubense Rupr.

Genus of grasses

Arthrostylidium is a Neotropical genus of climbing bamboo in the grass family. the species are native to Central America, the West Indies, northern South America, and southern Mexico.

== Species ==
29 species are accepted.

1. Arthrostylidium auriculatum Londoño & L.G.Clark
2. Arthrostylidium berryi Judz. & Davidse
3. Arthrostylidium cachimboense Lopes-Neto & P.L.Viana
4. Arthrostylidium canaliculatum Renvoize
5. Arthrostylidium chiribiquetense Londoño & L.G.Clark
6. Arthrostylidium cubense Rupr.
7. Arthrostylidium distichum Pilg.
8. Arthrostylidium ekmanii Hitchc.
9. Arthrostylidium excelsum Griseb.
10. Arthrostylidium fimbriatum Griseb.
11. Arthrostylidium fimbrinodum Judz. & L.G.Clark
12. Arthrostylidium grandifolium Judz. & L.G.Clark
13. Arthrostylidium haitiense (Pilg.) Hitchc. & Chase
14. Arthrostylidium judziewiczii Davidse
15. Arthrostylidium longiflorum Munro
16. Arthrostylidium merostachyoides R.W.Pohl
17. Arthrostylidium multispicatum Pilg.
18. Arthrostylidium obtusatum Pilg.
19. Arthrostylidium pubescens Rupr.
20. Arthrostylidium punctulatum Londoño & L.G.Clark
21. Arthrostylidium reflexum Hitchc. & Ekman
22. Arthrostylidium sarmentosum Pilg.
23. Arthrostylidium scandens McClure
24. Arthrostylidium schomburgkii (Benn.) Munro
25. Arthrostylidium simpliciusculum (Pilg.) McClure
26. Arthrostylidium urbanii Pilg.
27. Arthrostylidium venezuelae (Steud.) McClure
28. Arthrostylidium virolinense Londoño & L.G.Clark
29. Arthrostylidium youngianum L.G.Clark & Judz.

=== Formerly included ===
see Ampelocalamus, Aulonemia, Colanthelia, Chusquea, Didymogonyx, Guadua, Rhipidocladum, and Tibisia

- Arthrostylidium ampliflorum - Rhipidocladum ampliflorum
- Arthrostylidium amplissimum - Aulonemia amplissima
- Arthrostylidium angustiflorum - Rhipidocladum angustiflorum
- Arthrostylidium angustifolium – Tibisia angustifolia
- Arthrostylidium burchellii - Colanthelia burchellii
- Arthrostylidium ecuadorense Judz. & L.G.Clark – Aulonemiella ecuadorensis (Judz. & L.G.Clark) L.G.Clark, Londoño & Judz.
- Arthrostylidium effusum - Vianaea effusa
- Arthrostylidium farctum (Aubl.) Soderstr. & Lourteig – Tibisia farcta (Aubl.) C.D.Tyrrell, Londoño & L.G.Clark
- Arthrostylidium geminatum - Didymogonyx geminatum
- Arthrostylidium haenkei - Aulonemia haenkei
- Arthrostylidium harmonicum - Rhipidocladum harmonicum
- Arthrostylidium leptophyllum - Chusquea leptophylla
- Arthrostylidium longifolium - Guadua longifolia
- Arthrostylidium maculatum - Aulonemia parviflora
- Arthrostylidium maxonii - Rhipidocladum maxonii
- Arthrostylidium naibunense - Ampelocalamus naibunensis
- Arthrostylidium pittieri - Rhipidocladum pittieri
- Arthrostylidium prestoei - Rhipidocladum prestoei
- Arthrostylidium purpuratum - Aulonemia purpurata
- Arthrostylidium queko - Aulonemia queko
- Arthrostylidium racemiflorum - Rhipidocladum racemiflorum
- Arthrostylidium spinosum - Guadua longifolia
- Arthrostylidium steyermarkii - Aulonemia deflexa
- Arthrostylidium subpectinatum - Aulonemia subpectinata
- Arthrostylidium trinii - Rhipidocladum parviflorum

== See also ==
- List of Poaceae genera
