= L. chinensis =

L. chinensis may refer to:

- Leptocanna chinensis, a bamboo species endemic to Yunnan, China
- Leptochloa chinensis, a grass species
- Leymus chinensis, a wild rye species
- Linnaea chinensis, commonly known as Chinese abelia, a flowering plant species
- Litchi chinensis, the lychee, a tropical and subtropical fruit tree species primarily found in Asia, Southern Africa and Mexico
- Livistona chinensis, the chinese fan palm, a subtropical palm tree species
- Lobelia chinensis, a flowering plant species found in China

== See also ==
- Chinensis (disambiguation)
