= Tibisia pinifolia =

Scientific classification
- Kingdom: Plantae
- Clade: Tracheophytes
- Clade: Angiosperms
- Clade: Monocots
- Clade: Commelinids
- Order: Poales
- Family: Poaceae
- Genus: Tibisia
- Species: T. pinifolia

Binomial name
- Tibisia pinifolia (Catasús) C.D.Tyrrell, Londoño & L.G.Clark

Synonyms
- Arthrostylidium pinifolium Catasús

Species of bamboo

Tibisia pinifolia is a species of bamboo. It is endemic to Cuba.
