= Aulonemiella =

Scientific classification
- Kingdom: Plantae
- Clade: Tracheophytes
- Clade: Angiosperms
- Clade: Monocots
- Clade: Commelinids
- Order: Poales
- Family: Poaceae
- Subfamily: Bambusoideae
- Tribe: Bambuseae
- Genus: Aulonemiella; L.G.Clark, Londoño, C.D.Tyrrell & Judz.

Genus of plants

Aulonemiella is a genus of bamboo in the grass family (Poaceae). It includes two species native to Colombia and Ecuador.

- Aulonemiella ecuadorensis (Judz. & L.G.Clark) L.G.Clark, Londoño & Judz.
- Aulonemiella laegaardii L.G.Clark, Londoño & Judz.
