= Borinda =

Scientific classification
- Kingdom: Plantae
- Clade: Embryophytes
- Clade: Tracheophytes
- Clade: Angiosperms
- Clade: Monocots
- Clade: Commelinids
- Order: Poales
- Family: Poaceae
- Clade: BOP clade
- Subfamily: Bambusoideae
- Tribe: Arundinarieae
- Genus: Borinda; Stapleton

Species
- 46; see text

Genus of plant

Borinda is a genus of clumping bamboos. The genus was described in 1994 by Christopher Mark Adrian Stapleton, comprising species previously included in the genera Fargesia and Yushania. They have been recognized to present different flowers and shorter rhizomes than Yushanias.

Species range from the eastern Himalayas to south-central China and Vietnam.

== Species ==
46 species are accepted.

- Borinda acuticontracta (T.P.Yi) Stapleton
- Borinda adpressa (T.P.Yi) Stapleton
- Borinda albocerea (Hsueh f. & T.P.Yi) Stapleton
- Borinda altior (T.P.Yi) Stapleton
- Borinda angustissima (T.P.Yi) Stapleton
- Borinda communis (T.P.Yi) Stapleton
- Borinda contracta (T.P.Yi) Stapleton
- Borinda declivis (T.P.Yi) Stapleton
- Borinda dura (T.P.Yi) Stapleton
- Borinda edulis (Hsueh f. & T.P.Yi) Stapleton
- Borinda elegans (T.P.Yi) Stapleton
- Borinda emaculata (T.P.Yi) Stapleton
- Borinda erecta (T.P.Yi) Stapleton
- Borinda extensa (T.P.Yi) Stapleton
- Borinda fansipanensis (T.Q.Nguyen) Stapleton
- Borinda farcta (T.P.Yi) Stapleton
- Borinda ferax (Keng) Stapleton
- Borinda frigidis (T.P.Yi) Stapleton
- Borinda glabrifolia (T.P.Yi) Stapleton
- Borinda grossa (T.P.Yi) Stapleton
- Borinda hsuehiana (T.P.Yi) Stapleton
- Borinda hygrophila (Hsueh f. & T.P.Yi) Stapleton
- Borinda lushuiensis (Hsueh f. & T.P.Yi) Stapleton
- Borinda macclureana (Bor) Stapleton
- Borinda mairei (Hack. ex Hand.-Mazz.) Stapleton
- Borinda muliensis (T.P.Yi) Stapleton
- Borinda nivalis (T.P.Yi & J.Y.Shi) Stapleton
- Borinda nujiangensis (Hsueh & C.M.Hui) Stapleton
- Borinda papyrifera (T.P.Yi) Stapleton
- Borinda perlonga (Hsueh f. & T.P.Yi) Stapleton
- Borinda pleniculmis (Hand.-Mazz.) Stapleton
- Borinda praecipua (T.P.Yi) Stapleton
- Borinda sagittatinea (T.P.Yi) Stapleton
- Borinda similaris (Hsueh f. & T.P.Yi) Stapleton
- Borinda solida (T.P.Yi) Stapleton
- Borinda stricta (Hsueh & C.M.Hui) Stapleton
- Borinda strigosa (T.P.Yi) Stapleton
- Borinda subflexuosa (T.P.Yi) Stapleton
- Borinda sylvestris (T.P.Yi) Stapleton
- Borinda tengchongensis (Hsueh & C.M.Hui) Stapleton
- Borinda utilis (T.P.Yi) Stapleton
- Borinda viridis (D.Z.Li & X.Y.Ye) Stapleton
- Borinda xianggelilaensis (T.P.Yi & L.Yang) Stapleton
- Borinda yajiangensis (T.P.Yi & J.Y.Shi) Stapleton
- Borinda yulongshanensis (T.P.Yi) Stapleton
- Borinda zayuensis (T.P.Yi) Stapleton
