= Bonia amplexicaulis =

Scientific classification
- Kingdom: Plantae
- Clade: Tracheophytes
- Clade: Angiosperms
- Clade: Monocots
- Clade: Commelinids
- Order: Poales
- Family: Poaceae
- Genus: Bonia
- Species: B. amplexicaulis

Binomial name
- Bonia amplexicaulis (L.C.Chia, H.L.Fung & Y.L.Yang) N.H.Xia

Species of bamboo

Bonia amplexicaulis is a slender stemmed perennial bamboo species that can grow up to 10 meters in height. It is widely distributed in the rocky desert areas of Guangxi, Guangdong, Guizhou, Yunnan and other provinces of south-western China.
