= Arthrostylidium punctulatum =

Scientific classification
- Kingdom: Plantae
- Clade: Tracheophytes
- Clade: Angiosperms
- Clade: Monocots
- Clade: Commelinids
- Order: Poales
- Family: Poaceae
- Genus: Arthrostylidium
- Species: A. punctulatum

Binomial name
- Arthrostylidium punctulatum Londoño & L.G.Clark

Species of grass

Arthrostylidium punctulatum is a species of Arthrostylidium bamboo in the grass family.

== Distribution ==
Arthrostylidium punctulatum is endemic to Colombia.

== Description ==
Arthrostylidium punctulatum grows up to a height of 400–700 mm.
