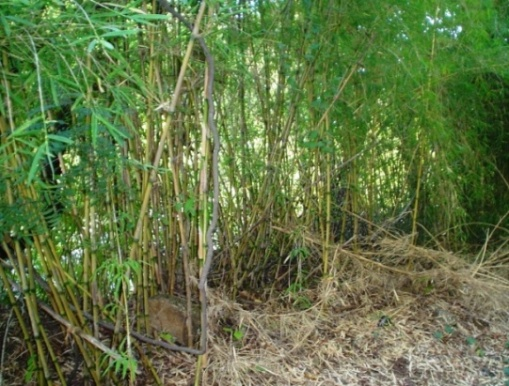

Scientific classification
- Kingdom: Plantae
- Clade: Tracheophytes
- Clade: Angiosperms
- Clade: Monocots
- Clade: Commelinids
- Order: Poales
- Family: Poaceae
- Genus: Chusquea
- Species: C. culeou

Binomial name
- Chusquea culeou Desvaux.

= Chusquea culeou =

Species of grass

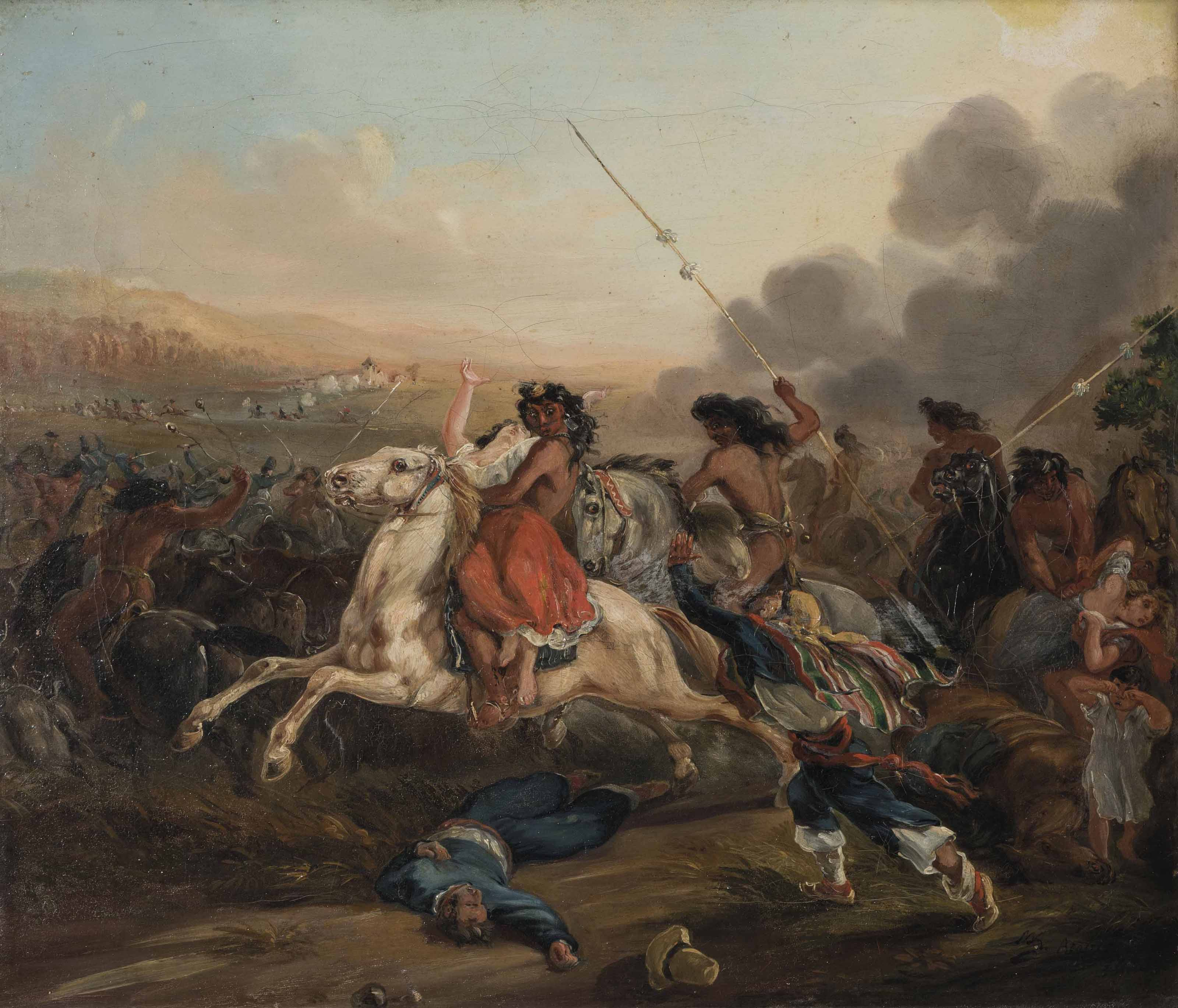
Mapuches using C. culeou as spear during a malón raid

Chusquea culeou, the Chilean bamboo, (Spanish: caña coligüe or colihue) is a species of flowering plant in the grass family Poaceae. An evergreen bamboo native to South America, unlike most species within the genus Chusquea, it is frost-tolerant and thus widely cultivated in temperate regions.

== Distribution ==
It is native to the Valdivian rainforests, humid temperate forests of Chile and southwestern Argentina. Chusquea culeou is a keystone species which can control patterns of forest dynamics by impeding regeneration of tree species.

== Description ==
Growing to 8 m (26 ft) tall by 200–350 mm (0.66–1.15 ft) broad, Chusquea culeou forms a substantial clump of greenery. It has hairy lanceolate leaves with a spine on their end, and its flower is a whisk of light brown colour. The plant also produces a caryopsis fruit. Blooming occurs after variable periods, that could last 60 years. After blooming and releasing its seeds, the plant dies. The cane is straight, up to 6 m (20 ft) in height, and was used by the Aboriginals for the pole of their spears. They are still used by the Mapuche people for a musical instrument known as trutruca.

A feature of this Chusquea is that the stems are solid, unlike most bamboos.

== Cultivation ==
Chusquea culeou is cultivated as an ornamental plant in gardens.

This plant has gained the Royal Horticultural Society's Award of Garden Merit (confirmed 2017).
