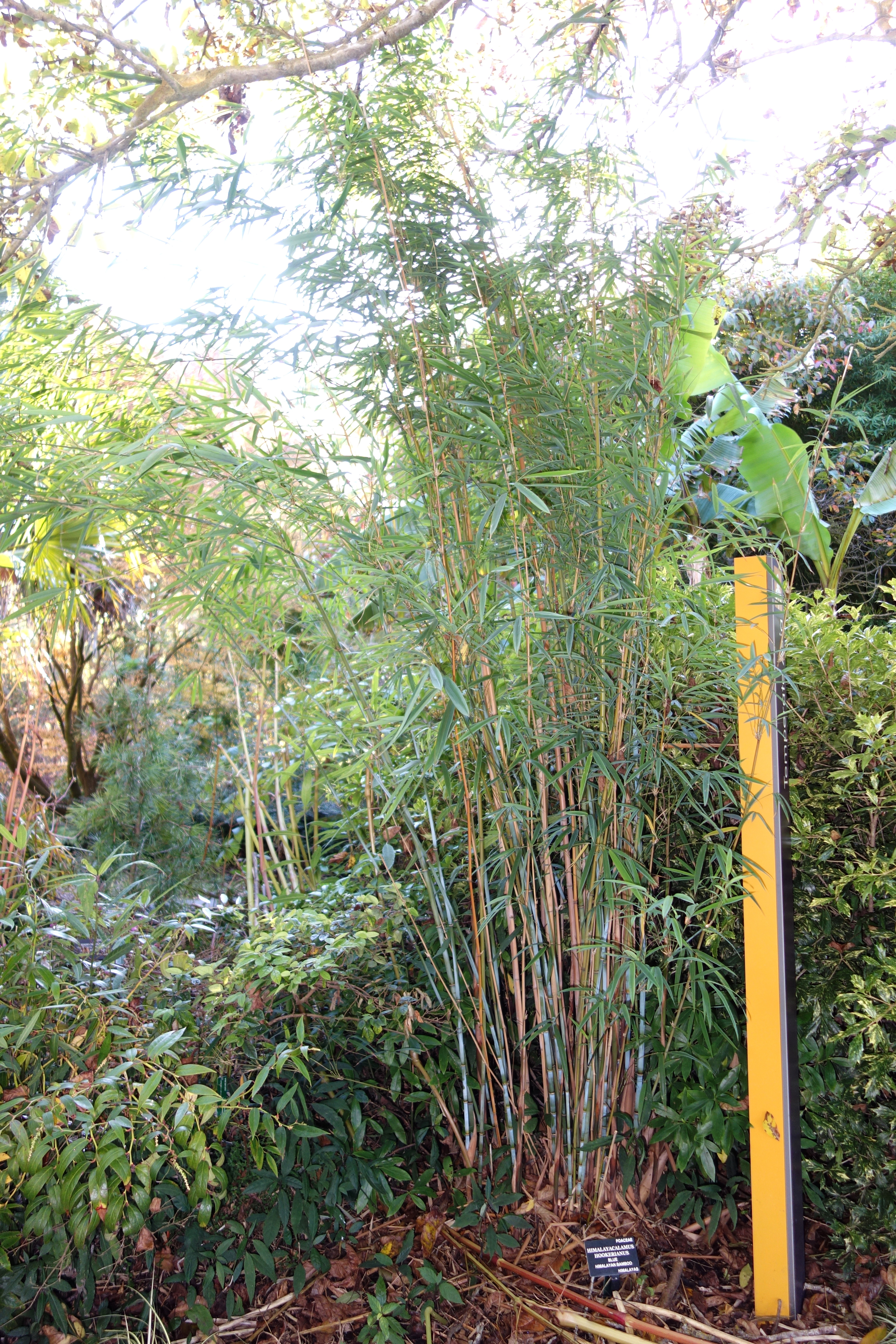

Scientific classification
- Kingdom: Plantae
- Clade: Tracheophytes
- Clade: Angiosperms
- Clade: Monocots
- Clade: Commelinids
- Order: Poales
- Family: Poaceae
- Genus: Himalayacalamus
- Species: H. hookerianus

Binomial name
- Himalayacalamus hookerianus (Munro) Stapleton

= Himalayacalamus hookerianus =

Species of grass

Himalayacalamus hookerianus is a species of flowering plant in the family Poaceae found in Nepal, Sikkim, Bhutan, and Assam.
