= Arthrostylidium schomburgkii =

Scientific classification
- Kingdom: Plantae
- Clade: Tracheophytes
- Clade: Angiosperms
- Clade: Monocots
- Clade: Commelinids
- Order: Poales
- Family: Poaceae
- Genus: Arthrostylidium
- Species: A. schomburgkii

Binomial name
- Arthrostylidium schomburgkii (Benn.) Munro

Species of grass

Arthrostylidium schomburgkii is a species of bamboo in the grass family (Gramineae, or Poaceae) and subfamily Bambuseae. It is commonly called Curata. The species is native to Central America, the West Indies, northern South America, the Guianas and southern Mexico. It is most noteworthy for the extreme length of its lowest internode, which can be up to sixteen feet (five meters) in length. This long internode is used by the indigenous people to make excellent blowguns. This internode is exceeded in length only by some populations of Cyperus papyrus. The upper internodes are much shorter; 18 to 24 inches (46 to 61 centimeters) in length.
