= Arthrostylidium pubescens =

Scientific classification
- Kingdom: Plantae
- Clade: Tracheophytes
- Clade: Angiosperms
- Clade: Monocots
- Clade: Commelinids
- Order: Poales
- Family: Poaceae
- Genus: Arthrostylidium
- Species: A. pubescens

Binomial name
- Arthrostylidium pubescens Rupr.

Species of plant

Arthrostylidium pubescens is a species of Arthrostylidium bamboo in the grass family.

== Distribution ==
Arthrostylidium pubescens is native to Puerto Rico and Venezuela.
