= Arthrostylidium haitiense =

Scientific classification
- Kingdom: Plantae
- Clade: Tracheophytes
- Clade: Angiosperms
- Clade: Monocots
- Clade: Commelinids
- Order: Poales
- Family: Poaceae
- Genus: Arthrostylidium
- Species: A. haitiense

Binomial name
- Arthrostylidium haitiense (Pilg.) Hitchc. & Chase (1917)

Synonyms
- Arundinaria haitiensis Pilg. (1907)

Species of grass

Arthrostylidium haitiense is a species of climbing bamboo in the grass family (Poaceae). It is endemic to the island of Hispaniola, which is divided between Haiti and the Dominican Republic. It grows in mountain forests, and can form dense thickets.
