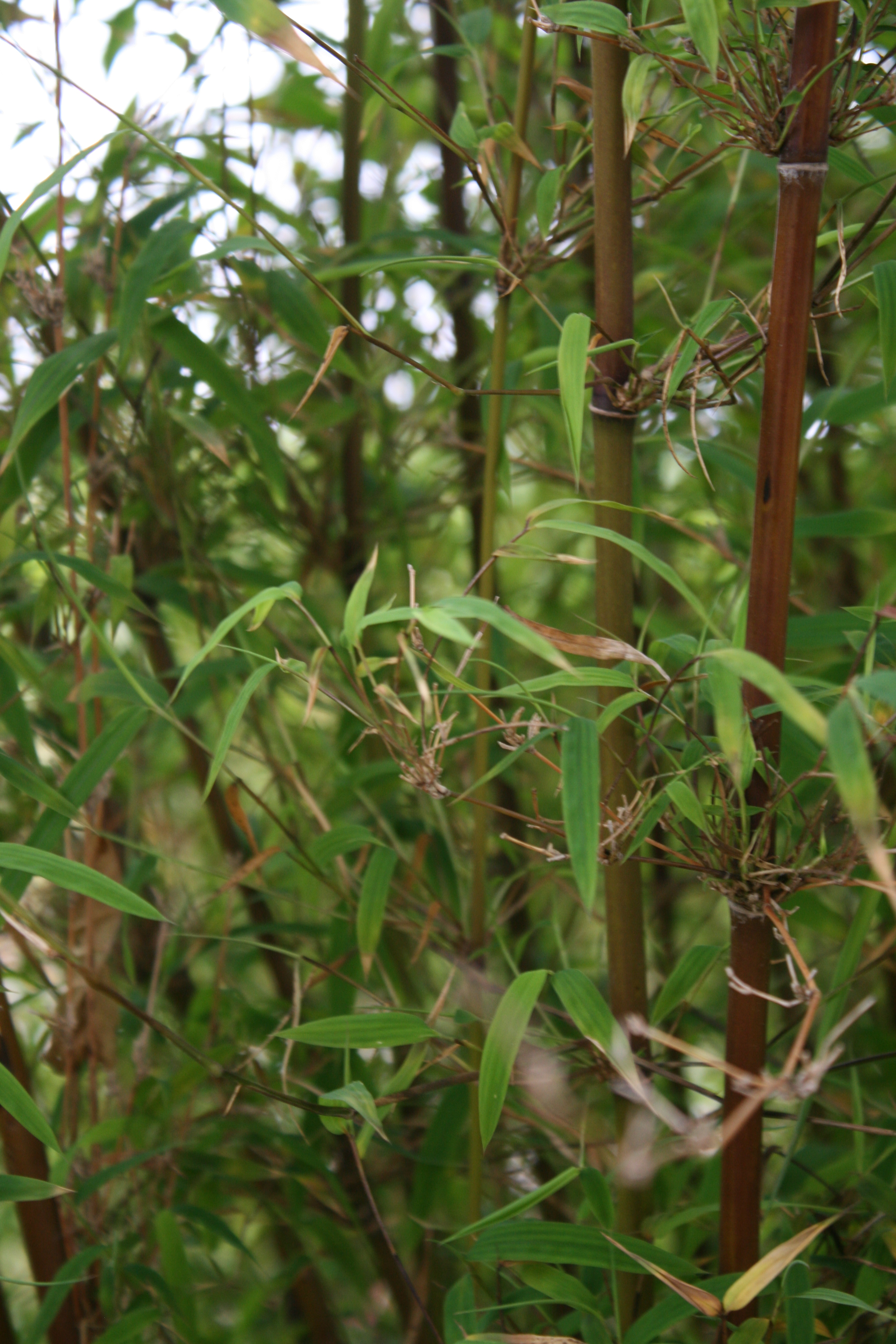
- Tibetan Princess Bamboo; Himalayacalamus asper

Scientific classification
- Kingdom: Plantae
- Clade: Tracheophytes
- Clade: Angiosperms
- Clade: Monocots
- Clade: Commelinids
- Order: Poales
- Family: Poaceae
- Subfamily: Bambusoideae
- Tribe: Arundinarieae
- Subtribe: Arundinariinae
- Genus: Himalayacalamus; Keng f.

Type species
- Himalayacalamus falconeri (Munro) Keng f.

= Himalayacalamus =

Genus of grasses

Himalayacalamus is an Asian genus of mountain clumping bamboo in the grass family. Species members are found growing at lower altitudes of the Himalaya in Bhutan, Tibet, India, and Nepal.

The genus is often confused with Drepanostachyum. That genus, however, features plants of many equal branches, Himalayacalamus species have one dominant branch.

== Species ==
As of January 2024, Plants of the World Online accepts the following species:

Image	Scientific name	Distribution
	Himalayacalamus asper Stapleton	Nepal
	Himalayacalamus brevinodus Stapleton	Nepal, Sikkim, Bhutan, Arunachal Pradesh
	Himalayacalamus collaris (T.P.Yi) Ohrnb.	Tibet, Nepal
	Himalayacalamus cupreus Stapleton	Nepal
	Himalayacalamus falconeri (Hook.f. ex Munro) Keng f.	Tibet, Bhutan, India, Nepal; naturalized in the North Island of New Zealand
	Himalayacalamus fimbriatus Stapleton	Nepal
	Himalayacalamus hookerianus (Munro) Stapleton	Nepal, Sikkim, Bhutan, Assam
	Himalayacalamus planatus Stapleton	Nepal
	Himalayacalamus porcatus Stapleton	Nepal
