= Arthrostylidium judziewiczii =

Scientific classification
- Kingdom: Plantae
- Clade: Tracheophytes
- Clade: Angiosperms
- Clade: Monocots
- Clade: Commelinids
- Order: Poales
- Family: Poaceae
- Genus: Arthrostylidium
- Species: A. judziewiczii

Binomial name
- Arthrostylidium judziewiczii Davidse

Species of grass

Arthrostylidium judziewiczii is a species of Arthrostylidium bamboo in the grass family. The species is native to Central America, the West Indies, northern South America, and southern Mexico.
