= Arthrostylidium reflexum =

Scientific classification
- Kingdom: Plantae
- Clade: Tracheophytes
- Clade: Angiosperms
- Clade: Monocots
- Clade: Commelinids
- Order: Poales
- Family: Poaceae
- Genus: Arthrostylidium
- Species: A. reflexum

Binomial name
- Arthrostylidium reflexum Hitchc. & Ekman

Species of grass

Arthrostylidium reflexum is a species of Arthrostylidium bamboo in the grass family.

== Distribution ==
The species is native to South America and the Caribbean.

== Description ==
Its width is typically straight, bilateral, and reaches 0.5 cm long. It has 3 Lodicules, 3 Anthers and 2 Stigmas.
