= Tibisia =

Scientific classification
- Kingdom: Plantae
- Clade: Tracheophytes
- Clade: Angiosperms
- Clade: Monocots
- Clade: Commelinids
- Order: Poales
- Family: Poaceae
- Tribe: Bambuseae
- Genus: Tibisia; C.D.Tyrrell, Londoño & L.G.Clark

Genus of flowering plants

Tibisia is a genus of flowering plants belonging to the family Poaceae.

Its native range is the Caribbean (Cuba, Hispaniola, Bahamas, Puerto Rico, and the Leeward Islands) and French Guiana.

Species:

- Tibisia angustifolia (Nash) C.D.Tyrrell, Londoño & L.G.Clark – Cuba
- Tibisia farcta (Aubl.) C.D.Tyrrell, Londoño & L.G.Clark – Bahamas, Cuba, Hispaniola, Puerto Rico, Leeward Islands, and French Guiana
- Tibisia pinifolia (Catasús) C.D.Tyrrell, Londoño & L.G.Clark – Cuba
