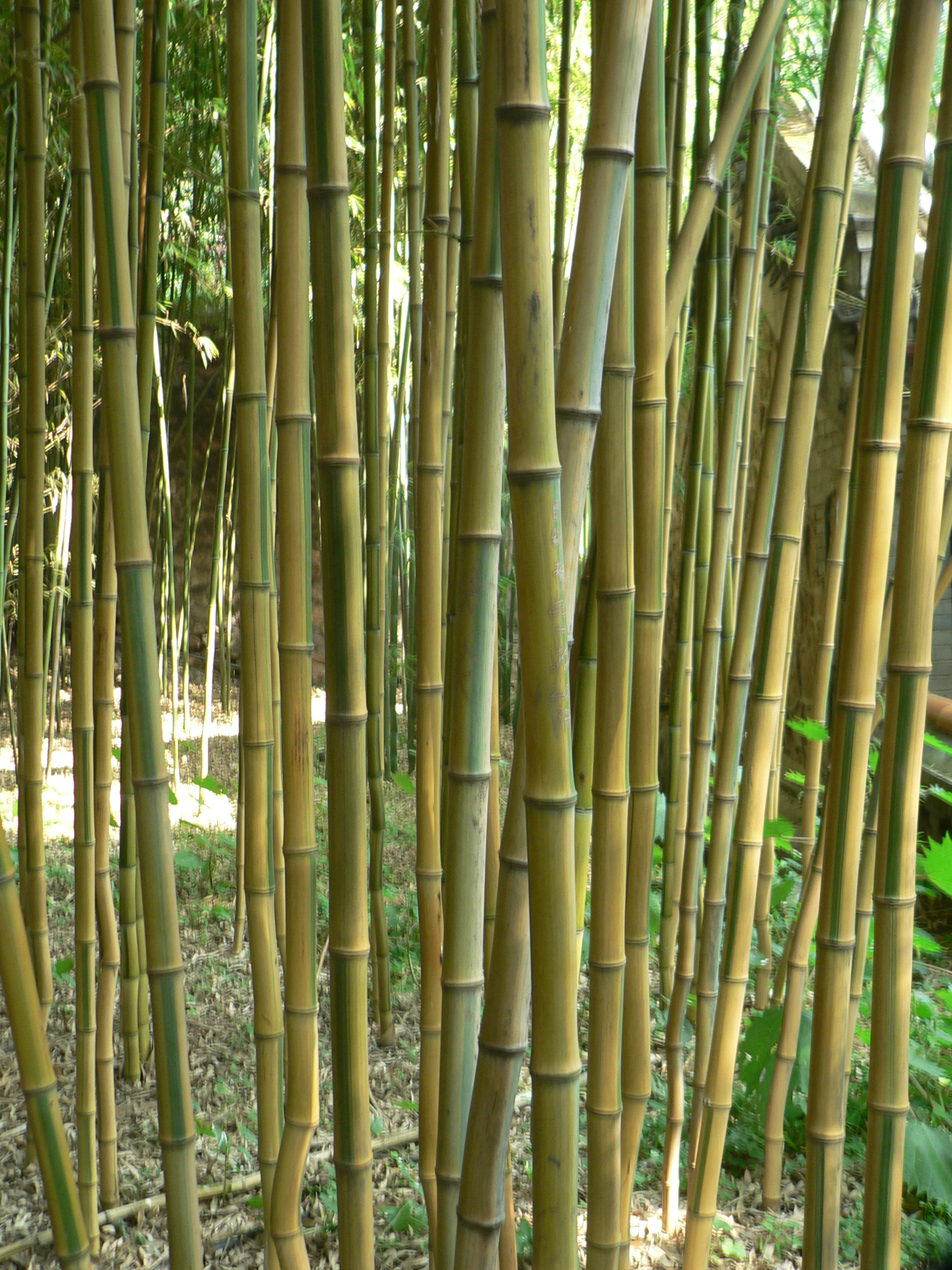
- P. aureosulcata f. spectabilis

Scientific classification
- Kingdom: Plantae
- Clade: Tracheophytes
- Clade: Angiosperms
- Clade: Monocots
- Clade: Commelinids
- Order: Poales
- Family: Poaceae
- Genus: Phyllostachys
- Species: P. aureosulcata

Binomial name
- Phyllostachys aureosulcata McClure

Synonyms
- Heterotypic Synonyms: Phyllostachys aureosulcata f. alata T.H.Wen; Phyllostachys aureosulcata f. aureocaulis Z.P.Wang & N.X.Ma; Phyllostachys aureosulcata f. pekinensis J.L.Lu; Phyllostachys aureosulcata f. spectabilis (C.D.Chu & C.S.Chao) C.D.Chu & C.S.Chao; Phyllostachys flavescens-inversa R.Stover; Phyllostachys spectabilis C.D.Chu & C.S.Chao

= Phyllostachys aureosulcata =

Yellow groove bamboo

Species of grass

Phyllostachys aureosulcata
- Traditional Chinese: 黃槽竹
- Simplified Chinese: 黄槽竹
Transcriptions
Standard Mandarin
- Hanyu Pinyin: huáng cáo zhú

Phyllostachys aureosulcata, the yellow groove bamboo, is a species of bamboo in the family Poaceae. It is native to the Zhejiang Province of China. It is a running bamboo with a distinctive yellow stripe in the culm groove (or sulcus) that is often grown as an ornamental.

== Description ==
This bamboo grows to an expected height of 9 meters (30 feet) with a culm diameter of 4 cm (1.6 in). In areas where the average winter minimum temperature is above -15°C (5°F), it may grow to a maximum height of 14 meters (46 feet) with a diameter of 6.5 cm (2.6 in). The typical form of this species has dark green culms with a yellow groove. Culm sheath colors appear purple-green usually striped with yellow. Lower portions of the upright culms occasionally bend in a zigzag pattern.

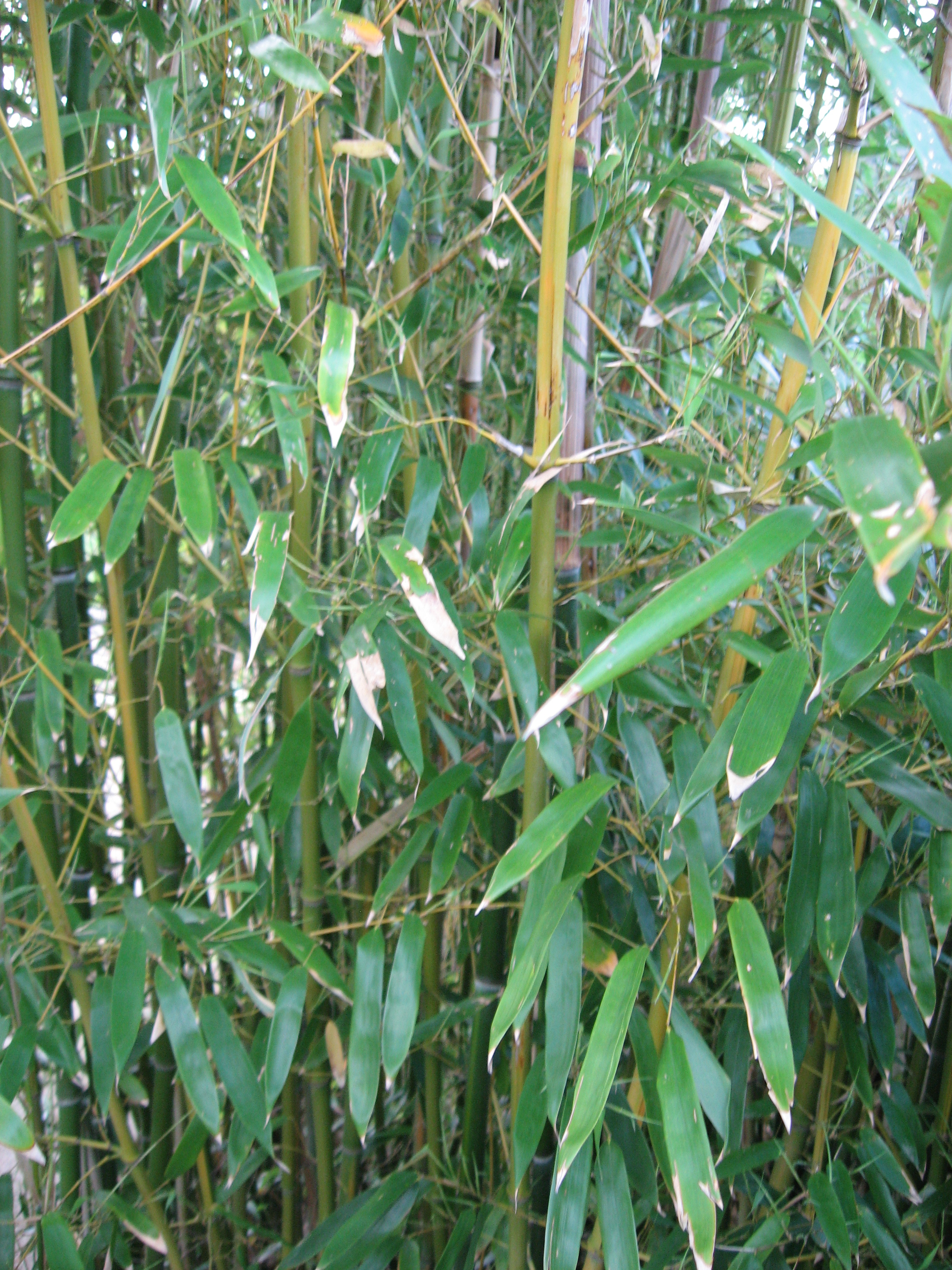
P. aureosulcata foliage

== Distribution ==
This bamboo grows in areas ranging from subtropical to warm temperate and tolerates low winter temperatures better than most bamboos, being one of the hardiest bamboos in the genus Phyllostachys. Outside its natural range and in areas where the coldest month has mean temperatures of below −4 °C (25 °F), the leaves of P. aureosulcata may not be evergreen and may turn beige and fall off.

In areas with severely cold winters (USDA hardiness zone 5 or colder) in the northern parts of the US, northern Asia, and northern Europe, all growth above ground will die back every winter if temperatures remain below −18 °C (0 °F) for extended periods but will regrow in the spring to 1.8 to 2.4 meters (5.9 to 7.9 feet) tall.

Phyllostachys aureosulcata is a popular bamboo in the warmer areas of the United States, Europe, Asia, and parts of Australia. In China it is cultivated and found in Beijing and the provinces of Henan, Jiangsu and Zhejiang.

== Name ==
The culm coloration inspires this bamboo's common name of "yellow groove bamboo" and botanical name of aureosulcata. The all-green cultivar 'Alata' is also known as "crookstem bamboo" due to its characteristic culm bends common to this species.

== Usage ==
Cultivated mainly as an ornamental, this species is also known for edible shoot production, being free of acrid flavor even when raw. An aggressive spreader, its dense upright growth makes a good hedge or privacy screen.

=== Cultivars and Forms ===
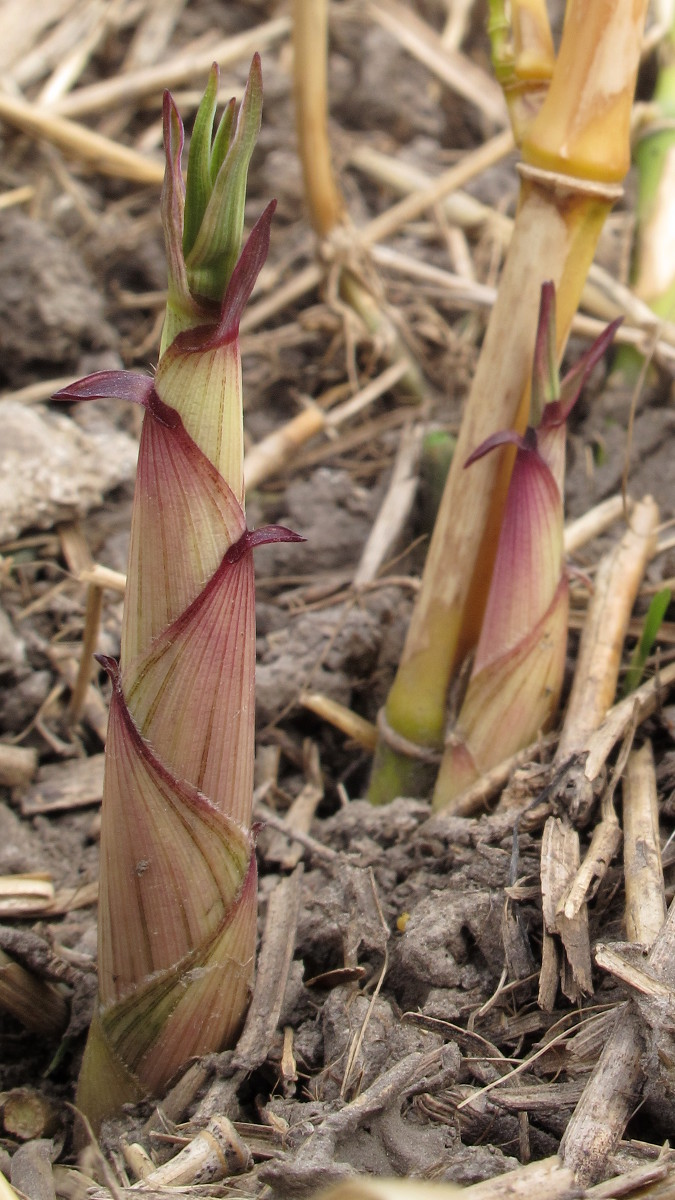
Young shoot of Phyllostachys aureosulcata cv. 'Lama Temple'

Several forms and cultivars of this species exist in a variety of culm color patterns. P. aureosulcata f. spectabilis reverses the colors of the typical form with yellow culms and a green sulcus. This form has gained the Royal Horticultural Society's Award of Garden Merit. The form aureocaulis has all-yellow culms and the cultivar 'Lama Temple' has culms of a brighter yellow that taper more rapidly to a shorter overall height. 'Harbin' has green culms with multiple vertical ridges and irregular streaks of yellow. Culms of 'Harbin Inversa' appear yellow with many thin green streaks, while lacking the ridges characteristic of 'Harbin.' A sport of spectabilis called 'Argus' shares the same robust growth qualities and color as spectabilis but with additional green vertical stripes scattered around the whole circumference of each culm. The all green form 'Alata' lacks any yellow culm coloring. In spring, yellow portions of new aureosulcata culms that receive direct sunlight during the early cool hours of the day can develop a red tint or magenta blush that lasts for a couple months.

== Regulations ==
New York State and Connecticut have regulations listing Phyllostachys aureosulcata as a prohibited invasive species.
