= Arthrostylidium scandens =

Scientific classification
- Kingdom: Plantae
- Clade: Tracheophytes
- Clade: Angiosperms
- Clade: Monocots
- Clade: Commelinids
- Order: Poales
- Family: Poaceae
- Genus: Arthrostylidium
- Species: A. scandens

Binomial name
- Arthrostylidium scandens McClure

Synonyms
- Arthrostylidium cacuminis McClure

Species of grass

Arthrostylidium scandens is a species of bamboo in the grass family, Poaceae.

== Description ==
Arthrostylidium scandens has 3 Lodicules, 3 anthers, 2 stigmas. The species grows to 500–800 cm long.

== Distribution ==
The species is common to northern South America.
