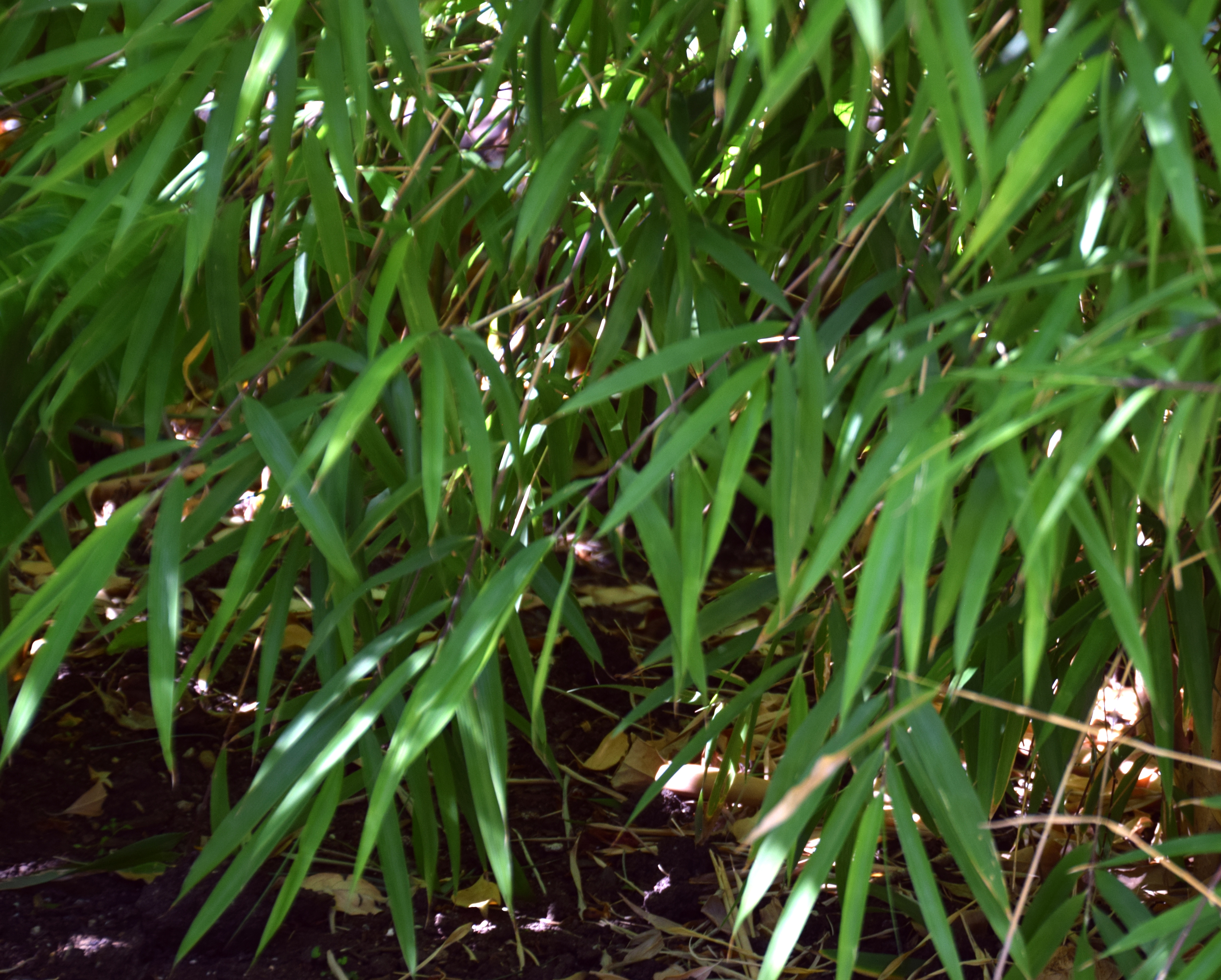
- Drepanostachyum intermedium at Dunedin Botanic Garden, New Zealand

Scientific classification
- Kingdom: Plantae
- Clade: Tracheophytes
- Clade: Angiosperms
- Clade: Monocots
- Clade: Commelinids
- Order: Poales
- Family: Poaceae
- Subfamily: Bambusoideae
- Tribe: Arundinarieae
- Subtribe: Arundinariinae
- Genus: Drepanostachyum; Keng f.

Type species
- Drepanostachyum falcatum (Nees) Keng f.

= Drepanostachyum =

Genus of grasses

Drepanostachyum is an Asian genus of medium-sized mountain clumping bamboos in the grass family. They are native to China, Indochina, and the Indian subcontinent.

== Taxonomy ==
The differences between this genus and Himalayacalamus are subtle: Drepanostachyum species have many equal branches while those of Himalayacalamus have one dominant branch.

Species

1. Drepanostachyum ampullare
2. Drepanostachyum annulatum
3. Drepanostachyum exauritum
4. Drepanostachyum falcatum
5. Drepanostachyum fractiflexum
6. Drepanostachyum intermedium
7. Drepanostachyum khasianum
8. Drepanostachyum kurzii
9. Drepanostachyum membranaceum
10. Drepanostachyum naibunensoides
11. Drepanostachyum polystachyum
12. Drepanostachyum semiorbiculatum
13. Drepanostachyum stoloniforme

Formerly included

several species now considered better suited to other genera: Ampelocalamus Dendrocalamus Fargesia Himalayacalamus
