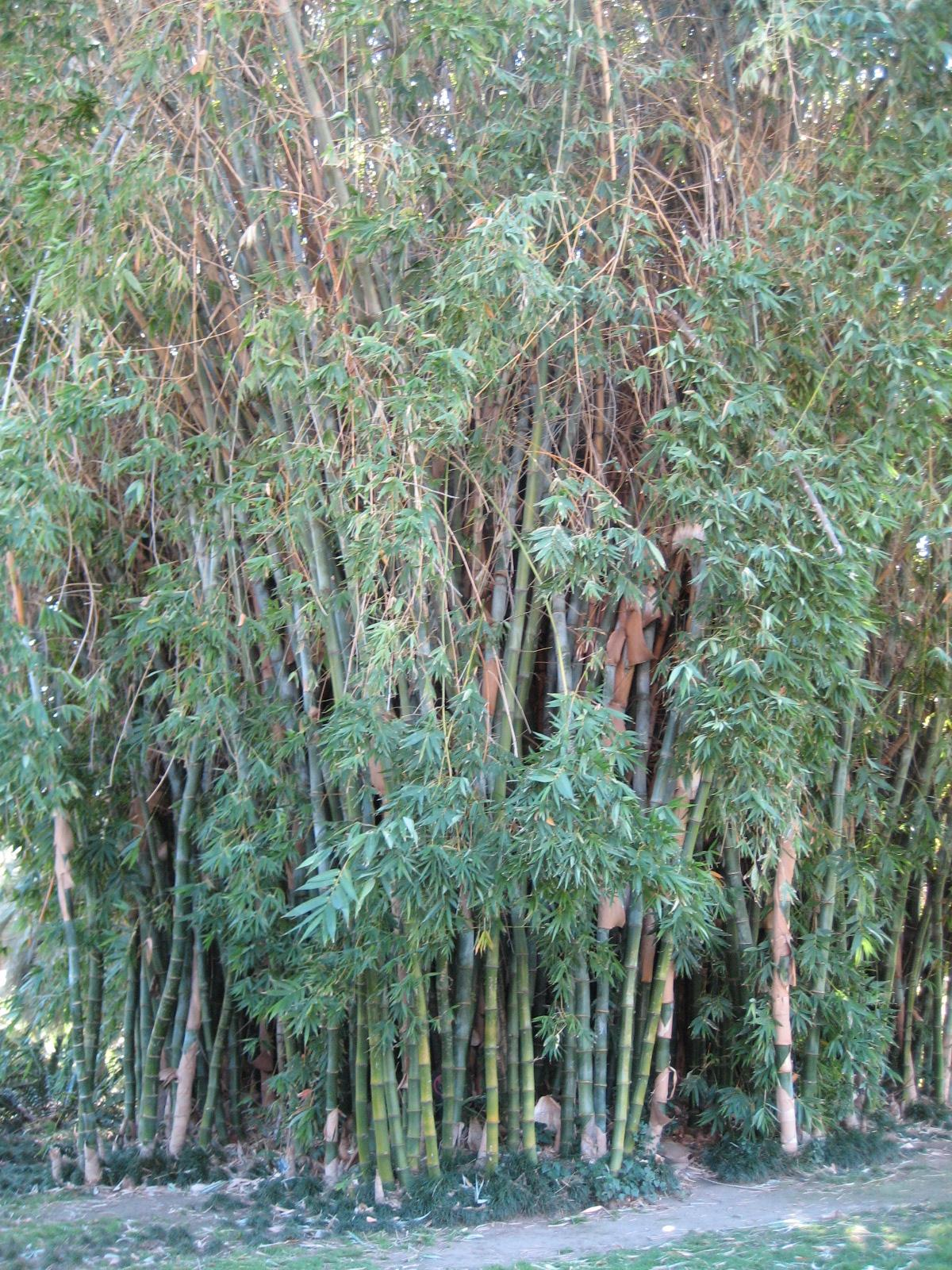

Scientific classification
- Kingdom: Plantae
- Clade: Tracheophytes
- Clade: Angiosperms
- Clade: Monocots
- Clade: Commelinids
- Order: Poales
- Family: Poaceae
- Genus: Bambusa
- Species: B. beecheyana

Binomial name
- Bambusa beecheyana Munro

= Bambusa beecheyana =

Species of plant

Bambusa beecheyana is a species of Bambusa bamboo.

== Synonyms ==
- Arundarbor beecheyana (Munro) Kuntze
- Bambusa beecheyana var. beecheyana
- Bambusa beecheyana var. pubescens (P.F.Li) W.C.Lin
- Bambusa verticillata Hook. & Arn. [Illegitimate]
- Dendrocalamopsis beecheyana (Munro) Keng f.
- Dendrocalamopsis beecheyana var. pubescens (P.F.Li) Keng f.
- Neosinocalamus beecheyanus (Munro) Keng f. & T.H.Wen
- Neosinocalamus beecheyanus var. pubescens (P.F.Li) Keng f. & T.H.Wen
- Sinocalamus beecheyanus (Munro) McClure
- Sinocalamus beecheyanus var. pubescens W.T.Lin
- Sinocalamus pubescens (P.F. Li) Keng f.

== Distribution ==
Bambusa beecheyana is found in Southern China to Indo-China and Taiwan.

== Description ==
Bambusa beecheyana is perennial and caespitose with short rhizomes. Its culms are erect, allowing it to grow 600 cm in height.
