= Arthrostylidium longiflorum =

Scientific classification
- Kingdom: Plantae
- Clade: Tracheophytes
- Clade: Angiosperms
- Clade: Monocots
- Clade: Commelinids
- Order: Poales
- Family: Poaceae
- Genus: Arthrostylidium
- Species: A. longiflorum

Binomial name
- Arthrostylidium longiflorum Munro

Species of grass

Arthrostylidium longiflorum is a species of Arthrostylidium bamboo in the grass family.

== Distribution ==
Arthrostylidium longiflorum is native to Venezuela in South America
