= Arthrostylidium merostachyoides =

Scientific classification
- Kingdom: Plantae
- Clade: Tracheophytes
- Clade: Angiosperms
- Clade: Monocots
- Clade: Commelinids
- Order: Poales
- Family: Poaceae
- Genus: Arthrostylidium
- Species: A. merostachyoides

Binomial name
- Arthrostylidium merostachyoides R.W.Pohl

Species of grass

Arthrostylidium merostachyoides is a species of Arthrostylidium bamboo in the grass family.

== Distribution ==
Anthrostylidium merostachyoides is endemic to Costa Rica in Central America.
