= Arthrostylidium obtusatum =

Scientific classification
- Kingdom: Plantae
- Clade: Tracheophytes
- Clade: Angiosperms
- Clade: Monocots
- Clade: Commelinids
- Order: Poales
- Family: Poaceae
- Genus: Arthrostylidium
- Species: A. obtusatum

Binomial name
- Arthrostylidium obtusatum Pilg.

Species of grass

Arthrostylidium obtusatum is a species of Arthrostylidium bamboo in the grass family.
