= Arthrostylidium multispicatum =

Scientific classification
- Kingdom: Plantae
- Clade: Tracheophytes
- Clade: Angiosperms
- Clade: Monocots
- Clade: Commelinids
- Order: Poales
- Family: Poaceae
- Genus: Arthrostylidium
- Species: A. multispicatum

Binomial name
- Arthrostylidium multispicatum Pilg.

Synonyms
- Arundinaria multispicata (Pilg.) Hack.; Arthrostylidium banaoense Catasús

Species of plant

Arthrostylidium multispicatum, commonly known as woodland climbing bamboo, is a species of Arthrostylidium bamboo in the grass family.

== Distribution ==
Arthrostylidium multispicatum is native to Cuba, Hispaniola, Puerto Rico, and Trinidad and Tobago.
