= Arthrostylidium excelsum =

Scientific classification
- Kingdom: Plantae
- Clade: Tracheophytes
- Clade: Angiosperms
- Clade: Monocots
- Clade: Commelinids
- Order: Poales
- Family: Poaceae
- Genus: Arthrostylidium
- Species: A. excelsum

Binomial name
- Arthrostylidium excelsum Griseb.

Synonyms
- Arundinaria excelsa (Griseb.) Hack.

Species of grass

Arthrostylidium excelsum is a species of Arthrostylidium bamboo in the grass family.

== Synonym ==
The synonym is Arundinaria excelsa.

== Distribution ==
Arthrostylidium excelsum is commonly found in Mexico, Central America, and the West Indies.

== Description ==
Arthrostylidium excelsum has a 2–3 mm diameter and can grow up to 100–500 cm long.
