= Arthrostylidium ekmanii =

Scientific classification
- Kingdom: Plantae
- Clade: Tracheophytes
- Clade: Angiosperms
- Clade: Monocots
- Clade: Commelinids
- Order: Poales
- Family: Poaceae
- Genus: Arthrostylidium
- Species: A. ekmanii

Binomial name
- Arthrostylidium ekmanii C.L.Hitchc.

Species of bamboo from the Americas

Arthrostylidium ekmanii is an Arthrostylidium species of bamboo native to Central America, the West Indies, northern South America, and southern Mexico.
