= Arthrostylidium cubense =

Scientific classification
- Kingdom: Plantae
- Clade: Tracheophytes
- Clade: Angiosperms
- Clade: Monocots
- Clade: Commelinids
- Order: Poales
- Family: Poaceae
- Genus: Arthrostylidium
- Species: A. cubense

Binomial name
- Arthrostylidium cubense Rupr.

Synonyms
- Arundinaria cubensis Hack.

Species of grass

Arthrostylidium cubense is a species of bamboo endemic to Cuba.
