= Chusquea mimosa =

Scientific classification
- Kingdom: Plantae
- Clade: Tracheophytes
- Clade: Angiosperms
- Clade: Monocots
- Clade: Commelinids
- Order: Poales
- Family: Poaceae
- Genus: Chusquea
- Species: C. mimosa

Binomial name
- Chusquea mimosa McClure & L.B.Sm.

Species of grass

Chusquea mimosa is a species of bamboo in the familyi Poaceae. It is endemic to southern Brazil.

== Subspecies ==
There are two accepted subspecies:

- Chusquea mimosa subsp. australis L.G.Clark
- Chusquea mimosa subsp. mimosa (syn. Chusquea elegans Renv.) It is native to Paraná (state) in Brazil.
