= Arthrostylidium simpliciusculum =

Scientific classification
- Kingdom: Plantae
- Clade: Tracheophytes
- Clade: Angiosperms
- Clade: Monocots
- Clade: Commelinids
- Order: Poales
- Family: Poaceae
- Genus: Arthrostylidium
- Species: A. simpliciusculum

Binomial name
- Arthrostylidium simpliciusculum (Pilg.) McClure

Synonyms
- Arundinaria simpliciuscula Pilg.

Species of grass

Arthrostylidium simpliciusculum is a species of bamboo in the grass family.

== Distribution ==
The species is native to Brazil, Colombia, Ecuador, and Peru.

== Description ==
Arthrostylidium simpliciusculum is a tufted perennial with short rhizomes. It grows to between 1 m and 1.2 m in height.
