= Arthrostylidium auriculatum =

Scientific classification
- Kingdom: Plantae
- Clade: Tracheophytes
- Clade: Angiosperms
- Clade: Monocots
- Clade: Commelinids
- Order: Poales
- Family: Poaceae
- Genus: Arthrostylidium
- Species: A. auriculatum

Binomial name
- Arthrostylidium auriculatum Londoño & L.G.Clark

Species of grass

Arthrostylidium auriculatum is a species of Neotropical bamboo native to Central America, the West Indies, northern South America, and southern Mexico.
