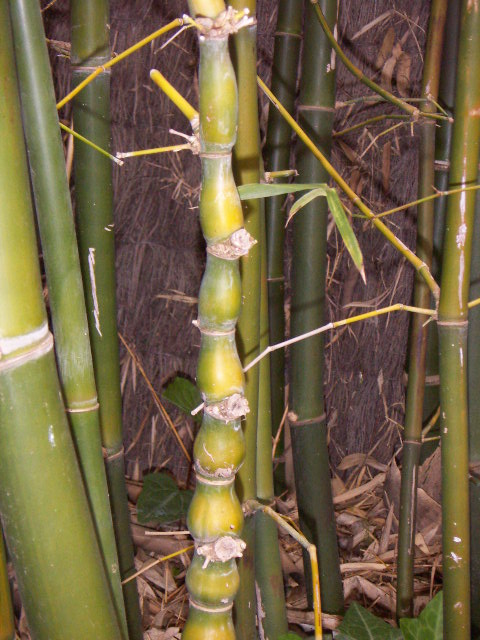

Scientific classification
- Kingdom: Plantae
- Clade: Tracheophytes
- Clade: Angiosperms
- Clade: Monocots
- Clade: Commelinids
- Order: Poales
- Family: Poaceae
- Genus: Bambusa
- Species: B. ventricosa

Binomial name
- Bambusa ventricosa McClure

Synonyms
- Leleba ventricosa (McClure) W.C.Lin

= Bambusa ventricosa =

Buddha Belly Bamboo

Species of grass

Bambusa ventricosa is a species of bamboo in the family Poaceae. It is native to Vietnam and to Guangdong province in southern China. The species is widely cultivated in subtropical regions around the world for the bulbous and ornamental stems. The species is used in bonsai.

Common names include Buddha bamboo and Buddha Belly Bamboo.
