= Bonia =

Scientific classification
- Kingdom: Plantae
- Clade: Embryophytes
- Clade: Tracheophytes
- Clade: Angiosperms
- Clade: Monocots
- Clade: Commelinids
- Order: Poales
- Family: Poaceae
- Subfamily: Bambusoideae
- Tribe: Bambuseae
- Subtribe: Bambusinae
- Genus: Bonia; Balansa

Type species
- Bonia tonkinensis Balansa

Synonyms
- Monocladus L.C.Chia, H.L.Fung & Y.L.Yang; Bambusa subgen. Bonia (Balansa) E.G. Camus

Genus of plant

Bonia is a genus of Chinese and Vietnamese bamboos in the grass family.

Species

- Bonia amplexicaulis (L.C.Chia, H.L.Fung & Y.L.Yang) N.H.Xia – Guangxi
- Bonia levigata (L.C.Chia, H.L.Fung & Y.L.Yang) N.H.Xia – Hainan
- Bonia parvifloscula (W.T.Lin) N.H.Xia – Guangdong
- Bonia saxatilis (L.C.Chia, H.L.Fung & Y.L.Yang – Guangdong, Guangxi
- Bonia tonkinensis Balansa – Vietnam
