= Arthrostylidium urbanii =

Scientific classification
- Kingdom: Plantae
- Clade: Tracheophytes
- Clade: Angiosperms
- Clade: Monocots
- Clade: Commelinids
- Order: Poales
- Family: Poaceae
- Genus: Arthrostylidium
- Species: A. urbanii

Binomial name
- Arthrostylidium urbanii Pilg.

Synonyms
- Arundinaria urbanii (Pilg.) Hack.

Species of grass

Arthrostylidium urbanii is a species of Arthrostylidium bamboo in the grass family.

== Distribution ==
Arthrostylidium urbanii is native to Cuba.

== Description ==
Arthrostylidium urbanii is a slender perennial species that grows to 500–700 mm in height. It possesses 3 Lodicules, 3 Anthers and 2 stigmas.
