= Bambusa dissimulator =

Scientific classification
- Kingdom: Plantae
- Clade: Tracheophytes
- Clade: Angiosperms
- Clade: Monocots
- Clade: Commelinids
- Order: Poales
- Family: Poaceae
- Genus: Bambusa
- Species: B. dissimulator

Binomial name
- Bambusa dissimulator McClure

Synonyms
- Heterotypic Synonyms: Bambusa dissimulator var. albinodis McClure; Bambusa dissimulator var. hispida McClure

Species of grass

Bambusa dissimulator is a species of bamboo in the family Poaceae. It is native to China and Vietnam and found as an introduced species in Brazil, and Puerto Rico. It is fast growing and has plentiful branches.

== Distribution ==
It can grow up to 50 feet (15 m) and has a diameter of 4.2 inches (11 cm).
