= Colanthelia =

Scientific classification
- Kingdom: Plantae
- Clade: Embryophytes
- Clade: Tracheophytes
- Clade: Spermatophytes
- Clade: Angiosperms
- Clade: Monocots
- Clade: Commelinids
- Order: Poales
- Family: Poaceae
- Subfamily: Bambusoideae
- Tribe: Bambuseae
- Subtribe: Arthrostylidiinae
- Genus: Colanthelia; McClure & E.W.Sm.

Type species
- Colanthelia cingulata (McClure & L.B.Smith) McClure

Genus of grasses

Colanthelia is a genus of South American bamboo in the grass family, native to southern Brazil and northeastern Argentina.

== Species ==
Eleven species are accepted.

- Colanthelia burchellii (Munro) McClure - Brazil (São Paulo)
- Colanthelia cingulata (McClure & L.B.Sm.) McClure - Brazil (Santa Catarina, Paraná, São Paulo)
- Colanthelia distans (Trin.) McClure - Brazil (Goiás)
- Colanthelia intermedia (McClure & L.B.Sm.) McClure - Brazil (Santa Catarina, São Paulo)
- Colanthelia kinoshitae Santos-Gonç., Filg. & L.G.Clark – Brazil (Rio de Janeiro)
- Colanthelia lanciflora (McClure & L.B.Sm.) McClure - Brazil (Rio Grande do Sul, Paraná, São Paulo)
- Colanthelia longipetiolata C.Jesus-Costa & Santos-Gonç. – Brazil (Minas Gerais)
- Colanthelia macrostachya (Nees) McClure - Brazil (São Paulo, Rio de Janeiro)
- Colanthelia rhizantha (Hack.) McClure - Brazil (Rio Grande do Sul, Paraná); Argentina (Misiones)
- Colanthelia secundiflora Santos-Gonç., Filg. & L.G.Clark – Brazil (São Paulo)
- Colanthelia sparsiflora Santos-Gonç., Filg. & L.G.Clark – Brazil (Espírito Santo)
