= Tibisia farcta =

Scientific classification
- Kingdom: Plantae
- Clade: Tracheophytes
- Clade: Angiosperms
- Clade: Monocots
- Clade: Commelinids
- Order: Poales
- Family: Poaceae
- Genus: Tibisia
- Species: T. farcta

Binomial name
- Tibisia farcta (Aubl.) C.D.Tyrrell, Londoño & L.G.Clark (2018)

Synonyms
- Arthrostylidium capillifolium Griseb. (1862); Arthrostylidium farctum (Aubl.) Soderstr. & Lourteig (1987); Arundinaria capillifolia (Griseb.) Hack. (1903); Arundo farcta Aubl. (1775); Calamagrostis farcta (Aubl.) J.F.Gmel. (1791)

Species of plant

Tibisia farcta (synonym Arthrostylidium farctum) is a species of bamboo in the grass family. It is native to the Caribbean (Bahamas, Cuba, Dominican Republic, Haiti, Leeward Islands, and Puerto Rico) and French Guiana.
