= Schizostachyum chinense =

Scientific classification
- Kingdom: Plantae
- Clade: Tracheophytes
- Clade: Angiosperms
- Clade: Monocots
- Clade: Commelinids
- Order: Poales
- Family: Poaceae
- Genus: Schizostachyum
- Species: S. chinense

Binomial name
- Schizostachyum chinense Rendle

Synonyms
- Leptocanna chinensis (Rendle) L.C.Chia et H.L.Fung

Species of grass

Schizostachyum chinense is a species of bamboo (tribe Bambuseae of the family Poaceae). The species is endemic to Yunnan, found from 1,500 to 2,500 m.

== Taxonomy ==
The species has also been treated as the sole species in the genus Leptocanna, where it was known as Leptocanna chinensis. Phylogenetically, Leptocanna is an intermediate genus between Melocanna and Schizostachyum.

== Use ==
Natives of Southeast Yunnan use this species for the making of gao-sheng, a kind of native rocket used in festivals.
