= Tibisia angustifolia =

Scientific classification
- Kingdom: Plantae
- Clade: Tracheophytes
- Clade: Angiosperms
- Clade: Monocots
- Clade: Commelinids
- Order: Poales
- Family: Poaceae
- Genus: Tibisia
- Species: T. angustifolia

Binomial name
- Tibisia angustifolia (Nash) C.D.Tyrrell, Londoño & L.G.Clark

Synonyms
- Arthrostylidium angustifolium Nash

Species of grass

Tibisia angustifolia (synonym Arthrostylidium angustifolium) is a species of bamboo endemic to Cuba.
