= Fargesia albocerea =

Scientific classification
- Kingdom: Plantae
- Clade: Embryophytes
- Clade: Tracheophytes
- Clade: Spermatophytes
- Clade: Angiosperms
- Clade: Monocots
- Clade: Commelinids
- Order: Poales
- Family: Poaceae
- Genus: Fargesia
- Species: F. albocerea

Binomial name
- Fargesia albocerea Hsueh & T.P.Yi

Synonyms
- Borinda albocerea (Hsueh & T.P.Yi) Stapleton; Fargesia pachyclada Hsueh & C.M.Hui; Yushania papyrifera subsp. albocerea (Hsueh & T.P.Yi) Demoly

Species of bamboo

Fargesia albocerea is a species of bamboo in the family Poaceae, native to western Yunnan province in China. As its synonym Borinda albocerea it has gained the Royal Horticultural Society's Award of Garden Merit as an ornamental.
