= Aulonemiella ecuadorensis =

Scientific classification
- Kingdom: Plantae
- Clade: Tracheophytes
- Clade: Angiosperms
- Clade: Monocots
- Clade: Commelinids
- Order: Poales
- Family: Poaceae
- Genus: Aulonemiella
- Species: A. ecuadorensis

Binomial name
- Aulonemiella ecuadorensis (Judz. & L.G.Clark) L.G.Clark, Londoño & Judz.

Synonyms
- Arthrostylidium ecuadorense Judz. & L.G.Clark

Species of grass

Aulonemiella ecuadorensis is a species of bamboo native to central and southern Colombia and northern Ecuador.
