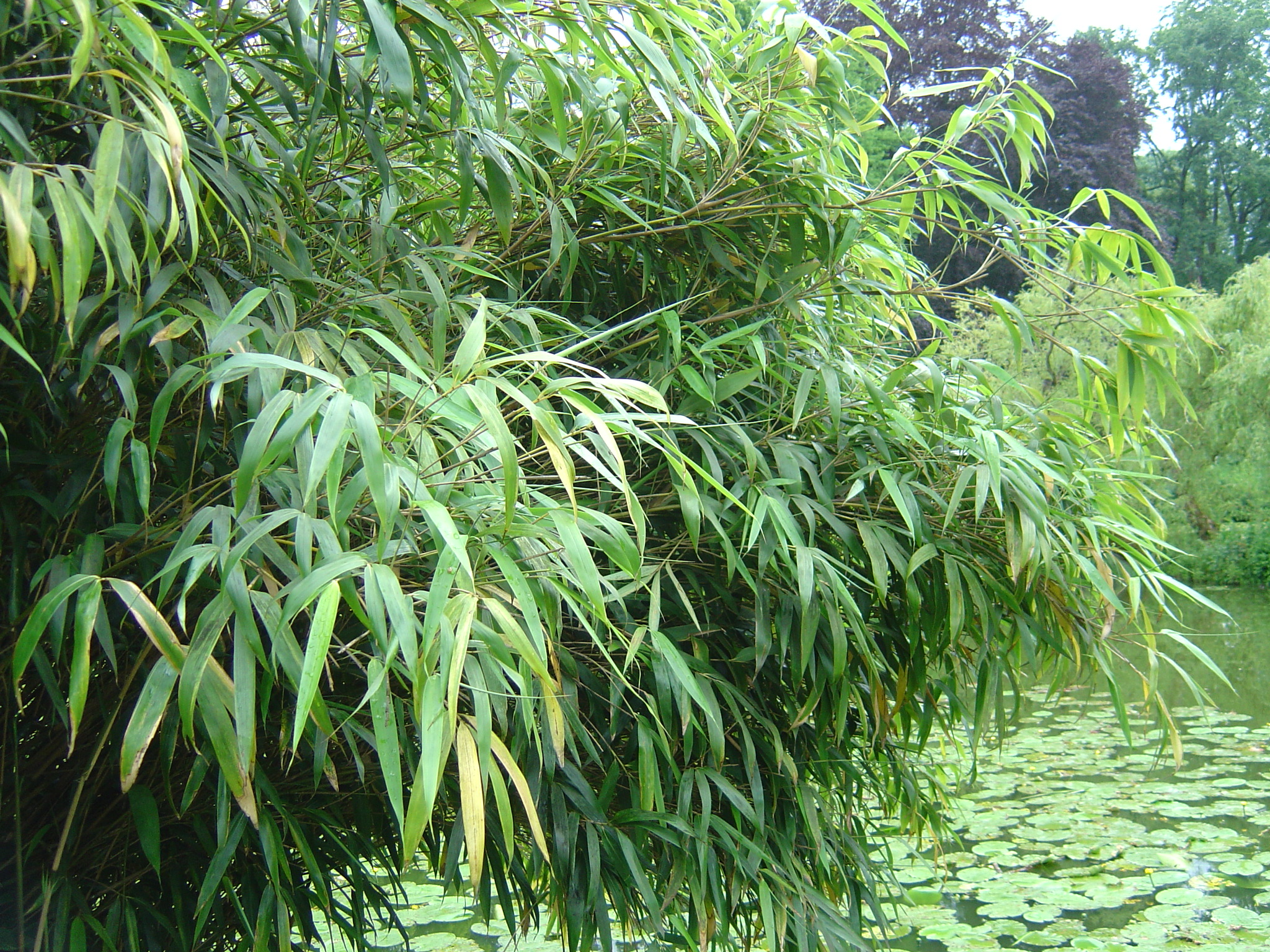
- Fargesia nitida Münster Botanical Gardens, Germany

Scientific classification
- Kingdom: Plantae
- Clade: Tracheophytes
- Clade: Angiosperms
- Clade: Monocots
- Clade: Commelinids
- Order: Poales
- Family: Poaceae
- Genus: Fargesia
- Species: F. nitida

Binomial name
- Fargesia nitida (Mitford ex Stapf) Keng f. ex T. P. Yi (GRIN)

= Fargesia nitida =

Species of grass

Fargesia nitida, commonly named blue fountain bamboo, is a clumping bamboo native to Sichuan, China. it is medium to small and very cold-hardy, but not tolerant of very high summer temperatures. The species bloomed in the years 2002–2005, so is not expected to bloom again for another 120 years.

This bloom is causing problems for the endangered giant panda, which consumes bamboo exclusively.
