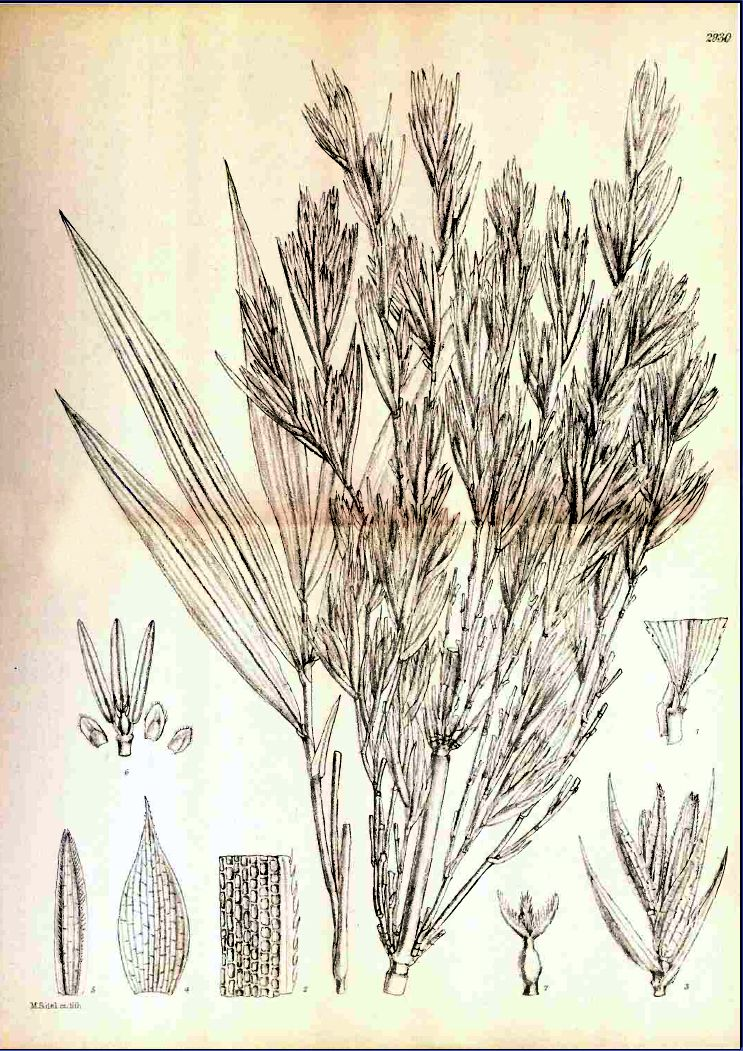

Scientific classification
- Kingdom: Plantae
- Clade: Tracheophytes
- Clade: Angiosperms
- Clade: Monocots
- Clade: Commelinids
- Order: Poales
- Family: Poaceae
- Subfamily: Bambusoideae
- Tribe: Arundinarieae
- Subtribe: Arundinariinae
- Genus: Thamnocalamus; Munro

Type species
- Thamnocalamus spathiflorus (Trin.) Munro.

Synonyms
- Arundinaria sect. Thamnocalamus (Munro) Hack.

= Thamnocalamus =

Genus of grasses

Thamnocalamus is a genus of clumping bamboo in the grass family. These species are found from the Himalayas as well as Madagascar and Southern Africa.

Thamnocalamus is closely related to Fargesia. The two genera are sometimes regarded as a single genus by some authors.

Species

1. Thamnocalamus chigar (Stapleton) Stapleton - Nepal
2. Thamnocalamus spathiflorus (Trin.) Munro - Tibet, Bhutan, India, Nepal
3. Thamnocalamus unispiculatus T.P.Yi & J.Y.Shi - Tibet

formerly included

see Chimonobambusa Drepanostachyum Fargesia Himalayacalamus Neomicrocalamus Pleioblastus Pseudosasa

- Thamnocalamus collaris - Himalayacalamus collaris
- Thamnocalamus cuspidatus - Fargesia cuspidata
- Thamnocalamus denudatus - Fargesia denudata
- Thamnocalamus dracocephalus - Fargesia dracocephala
- Thamnocalamus falcatus - Drepanostachyum falcatum
- Thamnocalamus falconeri - Himalayacalamus falconeri
- Thamnocalamus hindsii - Pseudosasa hindsii
- Thamnocalamus hindsii var. gramineus - Pleioblastus gramineus
- Thamnocalamus murielae - Fargesia murielae
- Thamnocalamus nitidus - Fargesia nitida
- Thamnocalamus nitidus subsp. ciliatus - Fargesia qinlingensis
- Thamnocalamus prainii - Neomicrocalamus prainii
- Thamnocalamus quadrangularis - Chimonobambusa quadrangularis
- Thamnocalamus ringala - Drepanostachyum falcatum
- Thamnocalamus robustus - Fargesia robusta
- Thamnocalamus sparsiflorus - Fargesia murielae
- Thamnocalamus spathaceus - Fargesia spathacea
- Thamnocalamus tessellatus - Bergbambos tessellata
- Thamnocalamus vaginatus - Pleioblastus argenteostriatus
