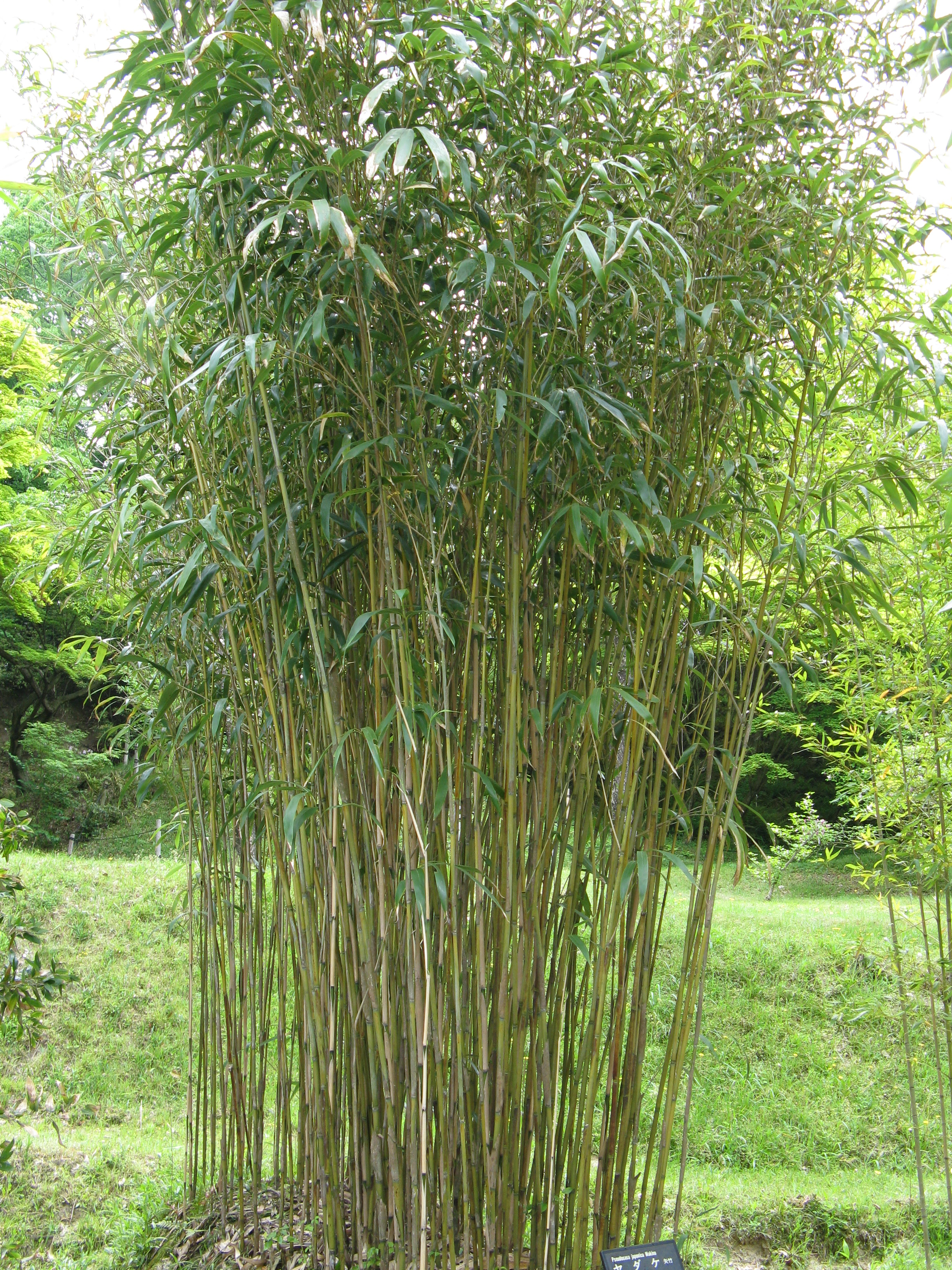
- Pseudosasa japonica

Scientific classification
- Kingdom: Plantae
- Clade: Tracheophytes
- Clade: Angiosperms
- Clade: Monocots
- Clade: Commelinids
- Order: Poales
- Family: Poaceae
- Subfamily: Bambusoideae
- Tribe: Arundinarieae
- Subtribe: Arundinariinae
- Genus: Pseudosasa; Makino ex Nakai

Type species
- Pseudosasa japonica (Siebold & Zucc. ex Steud.) Makino ex Nakai

Synonyms
- Yadakeya Makino

= Pseudosasa =

Genus of grasses

Pseudosasa is a genus of East Asian bamboo in the grass family.

These species are small to medium running plants, usually with one branch at a node. Its name comes from its resemblance to the genus Sasa. The species are native to China, Japan, Korea, and Vietnam, with a few species sparingly naturalized in various other regions (western Europe, North Africa, North America, New Zealand, etc.

Species

1. Pseudosasa aeria
2. Pseudosasa amabilis
3. Pseudosasa brevivaginata
4. Pseudosasa cantorii
5. Pseudosasa disticha
6. Pseudosasa gracilis
7. Pseudosasa hindsii
8. Pseudosasa humilis
9. Pseudosasa japonica
10. Pseudosasa jiangleensis
11. Pseudosasa longiligula
12. Pseudosasa maculifera
13. Pseudosasa membraniligulata
14. Pseudosasa nabeshimana
15. Pseudosasa orthotropa
16. Pseudosasa owatarii
17. Pseudosasa pallidiflora
18. Pseudosasa pubiflora
19. Pseudosasa subsolida
20. Pseudosasa viridula
21. Pseudosasa wuyiensis

formerly included

see Acidosasa Fargesia Gelidocalamus Indocalamus Oligostachyum Pleioblastus Sasa] Sasaella Sasamorpha Sinobambusa Yushania

1. Pseudosasa acutivagina – Acidosasa nanunica
2. Pseudosasa altiligulata – Acidosasa nanunica
3. Pseudosasa auricoma – Pleioblastus viridistriatus
4. Pseudosasa flexuosa – Oligostachyum scabriflorum
5. Pseudosasa guanxianensis – Indocalamus longiauritus
6. Pseudosasa hamadae – Indocalamus tessellatus
7. Pseudosasa hirta – Indocalamus latifolius
8. Pseudosasa hisauchii – Sasaella hisauchii
9. Pseudosasa kunishii – Gelidocalamus kunishii
10. Pseudosasa kurilensis – Sasa kurilensis
11. Pseudosasa longiligulata – Sasa longiligulata
12. Pseudosasa longivaginata – Indocalamus tessellatus
13. Pseudosasa naibunensis – Ampelocalamus naibunensis
14. Pseudosasa nanningensis – Sinobambusa intermedia
15. Pseudosasa nanunica – Acidosasa nanunica
16. Pseudosasa notata – Acidosasa notata
17. Pseudosasa oiwakensis – Yushania niitakayamensis
18. Pseudosasa projecta – Acidosasa nanunica
19. Pseudosasa purpurascens – Sasamorpha borealis
20. Pseudosasa spiculosa – Sasamorpha borealis
21. Pseudosasa taiwanensis – Gelidocalamus kunishii
22. Pseudosasa tessellata – Indocalamus tessellatus
23. Pseudosasa togashiana – Sasa shimidzuana
24. Pseudosasa truncatula – Indocalamus latifolius
25. Pseudosasa uchidae – Sasa kurilensis
26. Pseudosasa vicinia – Fargesia vicina
27. Pseudosasa victorialis – Indocalamus victorialis
28. Pseudosasa vittata – Indocalamus longiauritus
