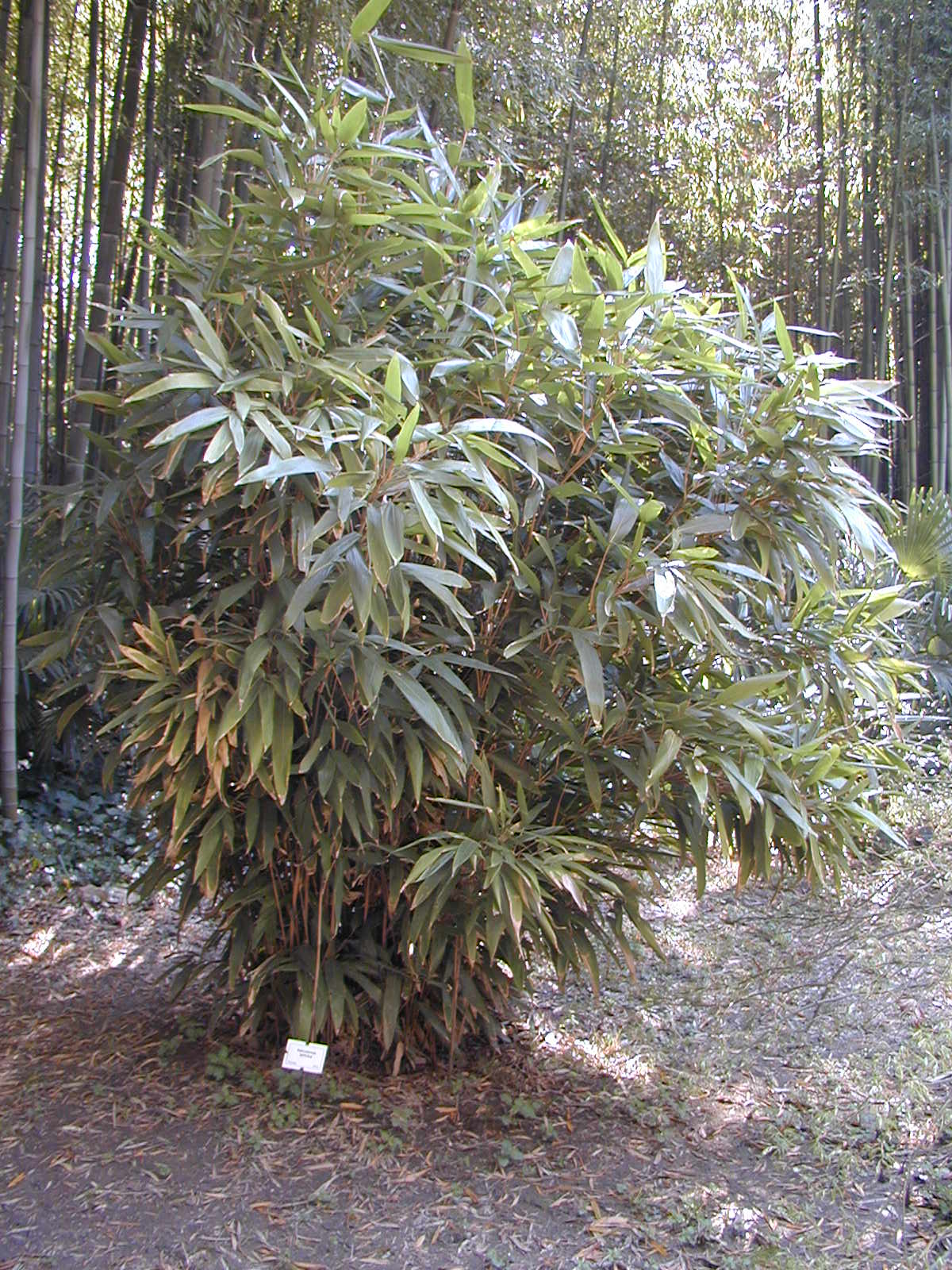
- Indocalamus latifolius

Scientific classification
- Kingdom: Plantae
- Clade: Embryophytes
- Clade: Tracheophytes
- Clade: Spermatophytes
- Clade: Angiosperms
- Clade: Monocots
- Clade: Commelinids
- Order: Poales
- Family: Poaceae
- Subfamily: Bambusoideae
- Tribe: Arundinarieae
- Subtribe: Arundinariinae
- Genus: Indocalamus; Nakai

Type species
- Indocalamus sinicus (Hance) Nakai

= Indocalamus =

Genus of grasses

Indocalamus is a genus of about 35 species of flowering plants in the grass family (Poaceae), native to central and southern China, Hainan, Vietnam, and Laos. They are quite small evergreen bamboos normally up to 2 m (6.6 ft) in height, initially forming clumps and then spreading to form larger thickets. They have thick, glossy leaves. Ruo leaves, used to wrap foods such as rice to produce zong during the Dragon Boat Festival, originated in Fujian and referred to Indocalamus longiauritus originally but now are nonspecific to just about any leaf wrap.

Some species were formerly included in Sasa and Sasamorpha.

Indocalamus latifolius, I. solidus and I. tessellatus are found in cultivation in temperate regions, being very hardy down to −15 °C (5 °F).

== Species ==
As of December 2025, Plants of the World Online accepts the following 32 species:

- Indocalamus amplexicaulis W.T.Lin – Guangdong
- Indocalamus barbatus McClure – Guangxi
- Indocalamus bashanensis (C.D.Chu & C.S.Chao) H.R.Zhao & Y.L.Yang – Sichuan
- Indocalamus chebalingensis W.T.Lin – Guangdong
- Indocalamus chishuiensis Y.L.Yang & C.J.Hsueh – Guizhou
- Indocalamus confertus C.H.Lu – Sichuan
- Indocalamus cordatus T.H.Wen & Y.Zou – Jiangxi
- Indocalamus decorus Q.H.Dai – Guangxi
- Indocalamus emeiensis C.D.Chu & C.S.Chao – Sichuan
- Indocalamus guangdongensis H.R.Zhao & Y.L.Yang – Guangdong, Guangxi, Guizhou, Hubei, Hunan
- Indocalamus herklotsii McClure – Hong Kong
- Indocalamus hirsutissimus Z.P.Wang & P.X.Zhang – Guizhou
- Indocalamus hirtivaginatus H.R.Zhao & Y.L.Yang – Jiangxi
- Indocalamus hispidus H.R.Zhao & Y.L.Yang – Sichuan
- Indocalamus hunanensis B.M.Yang – Chongqing, Hunan, Sichuan
- Indocalamus inaequilaterus W.T.Lin & Z.M.Wu – Guangdong
- Indocalamus jinpingensis T.P.Yi & J.Y.Shi – Yunnan
- Indocalamus latifolius (Keng) McClure – Anhui, Henan, Hubei, Jiangsu, Shaanxi, Shanxi
- Indocalamus longiauritus Hand.-Mazz. – Fujian, Guangdong, Guangxi, Guizhou, Henan, Hunan, Jiangxi, Sichuan, Zhejiang
- Indocalamus macrophyllus C.F.Huang – Fujian
- Indocalamus multinervis (W.T.Lin & Z.M.Wu) W.T.Lin – Guangdong
- Indocalamus pedalis (Keng) Keng f. – Sichuan
- Indocalamus petelotii (A.Camus) Ohrnb. – Laos, Vietnam
- Indocalamus pseudosinicus McClure – Guangdong, Guangxi, Hainan
- Indocalamus pumilus Q.H.Dai & C.F.Huang – Guangxi
- Indocalamus quadratus H.R.Zhao & Y.L.Yang – Guizhou, Hunan
- Indocalamus sinicus (Hance) Nakai – Guangdong, Hainan
- Indocalamus suichuanensis T.P.Yi & Y.H.Guo – Jiangxi
- Indocalamus tessellatus (Munro) Keng f. – Hunan, Zhejiang
- Indocalamus tongchuensis K.F.Huang & Z.L.Dai – Fujian
- Indocalamus victorialis Keng f. – Sichuan
- Indocalamus youxiuensis T.P.Yi – Sichuan

Formerly included

see Acidosasa, Ampelocalamus, Arundinaria, Bashania, Bonia, Fargesia, Pleioblastus, Pseudosasa, Ravenochloa, Sinobambusa, and Yushania

- Indocalamus actinotrichus – Ampelocalamus actinotrichus
- Indocalamus andropogonoides – Yushania andropogonoides
- Indocalamus basihirsutus – Yushania basihirsuta
- Indocalamus confusus – Yushania confusa
- Indocalamus debilis – Arundinaria debilis
- Indocalamus dumetosus – Bashania fargesii
- Indocalamus fargesii – Bashania fargesii
- Indocalamus floribundus – Yushania floribunda
- Indocalamus humilis – Sinobambusa humila
- Indocalamus mairei – Fargesia mairei
- Indocalamus megalothyrsus – Yushania megalothyrsa
- Indocalamus nanunicus – Acidosasa nanunica
- Indocalamus niitakayamensis – Yushania niitakayamensis
- Indocalamus oiwakensis – Yushania niitakayamensis
- Indocalamus pallidiflorus – Pseudosasa pubiflora
- Indocalamus parvifolius – Fargesia hackelii
- Indocalamus pubiflorus – Pseudosasa pubiflora
- Indocalamus rigidulus – Yushania rigidula
- Indocalamus scariosus – Bashania fargesii
- Indocalamus solidus – Bonia saxatilis
- Indocalamus varius – Pleioblastus amarus
- Indocalamus walkerianus – Yushania walkeriana
- Indocalamus wilsonii (Rendle) C.S.Chao & C.D.Chu – Ravenochloa wilsonii (Rendle) D.Z.Li & Y.X.Zhang
- Indocalamus wightianus – Yushania wightiana
