= Yi Tongpei =

Chinese bamboo taxonomist (1933–2016)

- 易同培
- Born: 1933
- Died: 2016 (aged 82–83)
- Known for: Taxonomy of Chinese temperate woody bamboos
- Scientific career
- Fields: Botany, bamboo taxonomy
- Workplaces: Sichuan Agricultural University; Chinese Academy of Forestry
- Author abbrev. (botany): T.P.Yi

Yi Tongpei (Chinese: 易同培; pinyin: Yì Tóngpéi; 1933 – 2016) was a Chinese botanist who specialised in the taxonomy of temperate woody bamboos of southwestern China.

== Career ==
Yi spent most of his career at Sichuan Agricultural University, on its campus at Dujiangyan, and also held a visiting professorship at the Flowers Research and Development Center of Southwest China, part of the Chinese Academy of Forestry in Kunming. He served on the editorial boards of the Journal of Bamboo Research, Bamboo Research, and Flora Sichuanica, and was deputy chairman of the bamboo industry in Sichuan. Under the standard botanical author abbreviation T.P.Yi, he named more than a hundred species and infraspecific taxa of bamboo, mainly in the genera Yushania, Fargesia, Bashania, Indocalamus, Phyllostachys, and Chimonobambusa. His work centred on the Sichuan–Yunnan–Tibet region of the Hengduan Mountains, a centre of bamboo diversity that overlaps much of the natural range of the giant panda.

Yi's monograph Bamboo Flora of Sichuan (四川竹类志; Beijing: China Forestry Publishing House, 1997) became a standard regional reference and is widely cited in later taxonomic and ecological studies of the region's bamboos.. He was also the co-author of the illustrated work Iconographia Bambusoidearum Sinicarum (中国竹类图志; Beijing: Science Press, 2008), which was reviewed in The Canadian Field-Naturalist under the English title Monograph on Bamboo in China An expanded English language treatment, Illustrated Flora of Bambusoideae in China, was published by Springer Nature in two volumes between 2017 and 2024

== Legacy ==
Two bamboo taxa are named in Yi's honour. The species Yushania tongpeii D.Z.Li, Y.X.Zhang & E.D.Liu, described from northeastern Yunnan in 2019, was named for his contributions to the taxonomy of the alpine bamboos, particularly the genera Fargesia and Yushania. In 2021, C. M. A. Stapleton erected the genus Tongpeia, segregated from Fargesia, in his honour, describing him as a botanist who discovered and described most of the species in Fargesia and Yushania. Among his taxa that have become reference points for the wider Sino-Himalayan bamboo flora are Fargesia angustissima T.P. Yi and Yushania pauciramificans T.P. Yi, and his transfer of Gamble's Arundinaria rolloana to Yushania rolloana.
