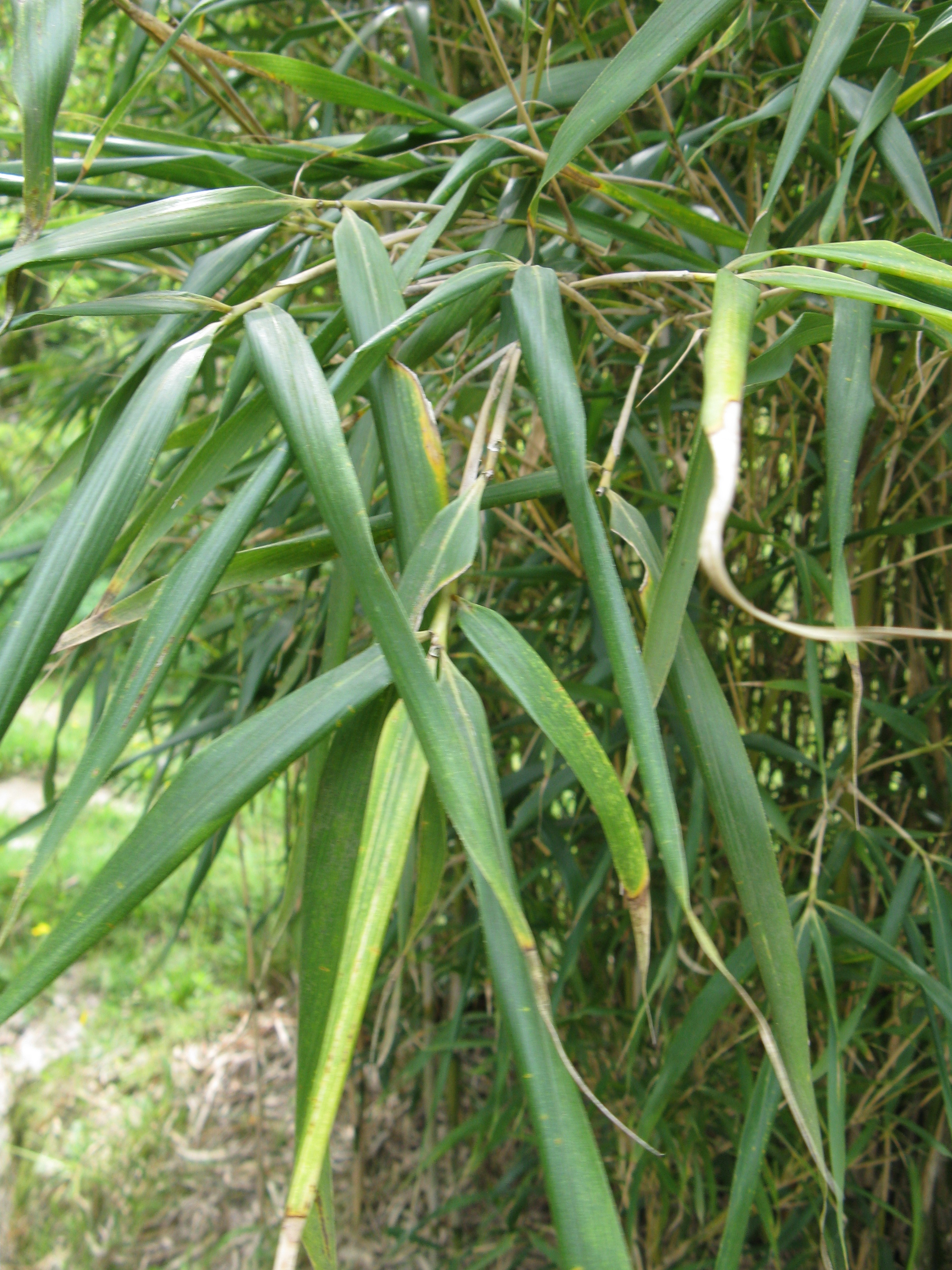
- Pleioblastus gramineus in cultivation at the Botanical Gardens Faculty of Science Osaka City University

Scientific classification
- Kingdom: Plantae
- Clade: Tracheophytes
- Clade: Angiosperms
- Clade: Monocots
- Clade: Commelinids
- Order: Poales
- Family: Poaceae
- Subfamily: Bambusoideae
- Tribe: Arundinarieae
- Subtribe: Arundinariinae
- Genus: Pleioblastus; Nakai

Type species
- Pleioblastus communis (Makino) Nakai

Synonyms
- Nipponocalamus Nakai; Polyanthus C.H.Hu ex Y.C.Hu 1991, illegitimate homonym not Auct. ex Benth. & Hook.f. 1883 (Amaryllidaceae)

= Pleioblastus =

Genus of grasses

Pleioblastus is an East Asian genus of monopodial bamboos in the grass family Poaceae. They are native to China and Japan, and naturalized in scattered places in Korea, Europe, New Zealand, and the Western Hemisphere.

The plant spreads by vigorous underground rhizomes which run along just beneath the soil surface, producing plantlets at the nodes. These can be used to propagate new plants, but if not removed they can become invasive.

The species Pleioblastus variegatus (green and cream stripes), and P. viridistriatus (green and yellow stripes) have gained the Royal Horticultural Society's Award of Garden Merit.

Genetic research suggests that this genus may properly be part of the genus Arundinaria.

Species

1. Pleioblastus altiligulatus – Fujian, Hunan, Zhejiang
2. Pleioblastus amarus – southern China
3. Pleioblastus argenteostriatus – Japan
4. Pleioblastus fortunei – Japan
5. Pleioblastus gramineus – Nansei-shoto (Ryukyu Is)
6. Pleioblastus guilongshanensis – Fujian
7. Pleioblastus hattorianus – Honshu
8. Pleioblastus hsienchuensis – Zhejiang
9. Pleioblastus incarnatus – Fujian
10. Pleioblastus kodzumae – Kyushu
11. Pleioblastus linearis – Nansei-shoto (Ryukyu Is)
12. Pleioblastus maculatus – southern China
13. Pleioblastus matsunoi – Honshu
14. Pleioblastus nagashima – Honshu, Kyushu
15. Pleioblastus pseudosasaoides – Honshu
16. Pleioblastus rugatus – Zhejiang
17. Pleioblastus sanmingensis – Fujian
18. Pleioblastus simonii – Japan
19. Pleioblastus solidus – Jiangsu, Zhejiang
20. Pleioblastus truncatus – Zhejiang
21. Pleioblastus viridistriatus – Japan
22. Pleioblastus wuyishanensis – Fujian
23. Pleioblastus yixingensis – Jiangsu

formerly included

see Acidosasa Ampelocalamus Chimonocalamus Drepanostachyum Oligostachyum Pseudosasa Sasaella Sinobambusa Yushania

- Pleioblastus actinotrichus – Ampelocalamus actinotrichus
- Pleioblastus acutiligulatus – Acidosasa notata
- Pleioblastus altiligulatus var. spongiosus – Oligostachyum spongiosum
- Pleioblastus asanoi – Pseudosasa humilis
- Pleioblastus baviensis – Chimonocalamus baviensis
- Pleioblastus distichus – Pseudosasa disticha
- Pleioblastus dolichanthus – Sinobambusa tootsik
- Pleioblastus falcatus – Drepanostachyum falcatum
- Pleioblastus globinodus – Oligostachyum gracilipes
- Pleioblastus hashimotoi – Sasaella masamuneana
- Pleioblastus hindsii – Pseudosasa hindsii
- Pleioblastus hispidulus – Pseudosasa hindsii
- Pleioblastus humilis – Pseudosasa humilis
- Pleioblastus hupehensis – Oligostachyum hupehense
- Pleioblastus intermedius – Acidosasa notata
- Pleioblastus koshisimonii – Pseudosasa humilis
- Pleioblastus lasiochlamys – Pseudosasa humilis
- Pleioblastus leucorhodus – Sasaella leucorhoda
- Pleioblastus longifimbriatus – Sinobambusa intermedia
- Pleioblastus longifolius – Pseudosasa humilis
- Pleioblastus maculosoides – Acidosasa notata
- Pleioblastus masamuneanus – Sasaella masamuneana
- Pleioblastus nabeshimanus – Pseudosasa nabeshimana
- Pleioblastus naibunensis – Ampelocalamus naibunensis
- Pleioblastus niitakayamensis – Yushania niitakayamensis
- Pleioblastus oedogonatus – Oligostachyum oedogonatum
- Pleioblastus ohmiensis – Pseudosasa humilis
- Pleioblastus oiwakensis – Yushania niitakayamensis
- Pleioblastus pandus – Pseudosasa hindsii
- Pleioblastus ryokeanus – Pseudosasa humilis
- Pleioblastus sadoensis – Sasaella sadoensis
- Pleioblastus sawadae – Sasaella sawadae
- Pleioblastus tanegasimensis – Sasaella masamuneana
- Pleioblastus toyokensis – Pseudosasa humilis
- Pleioblastus usawae – Pseudosasa japonica
- Pleioblastus usuiensis – Pseudosasa humilis
- Pleioblastus virens – Pseudosasa humilis
- Pleioblastus yakusimensis – Sasaella masamuneana
- Pleioblastus yamakitensis – Sasaella hisauchii
