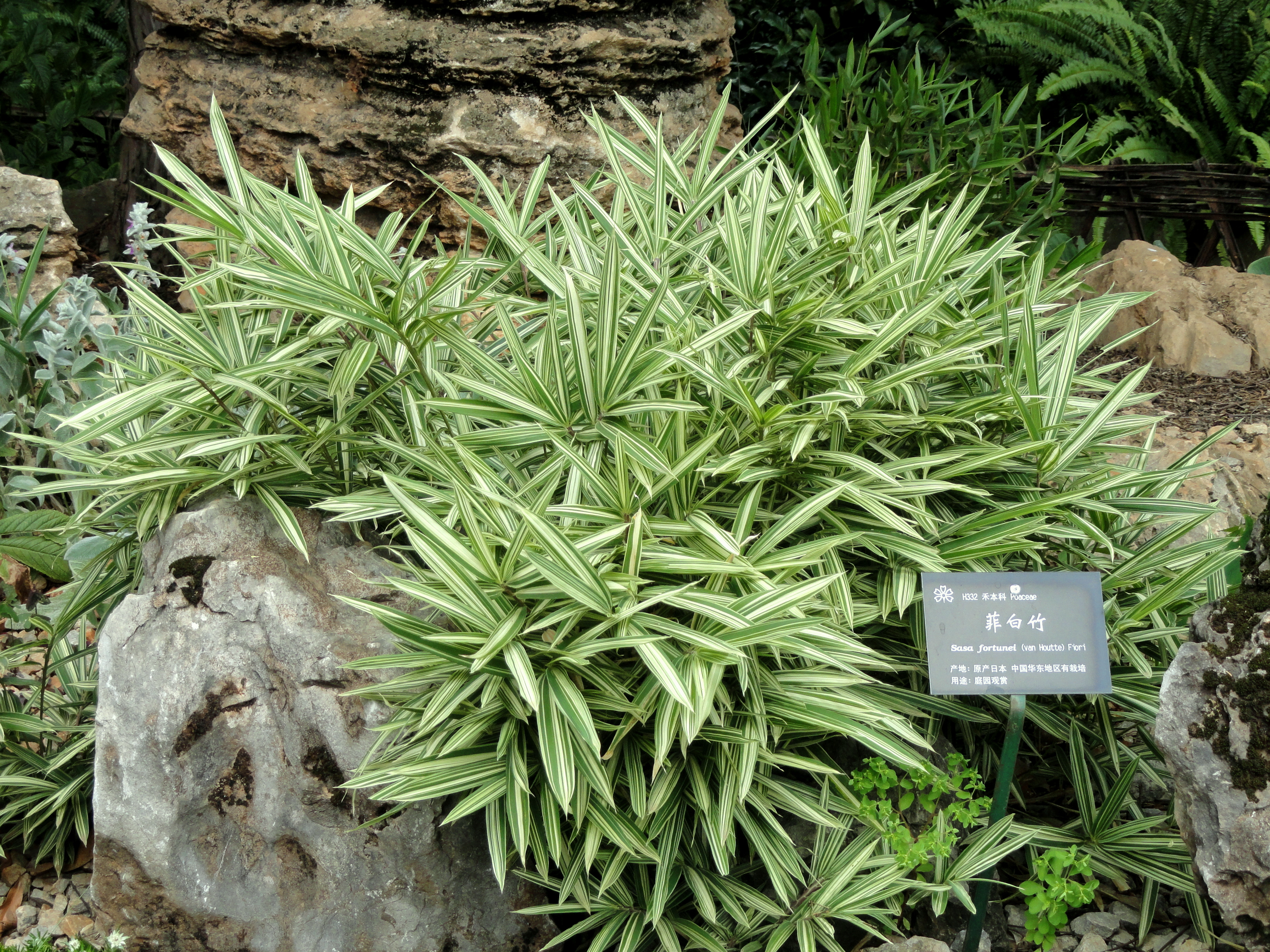
- At Kunming Botanical Garden
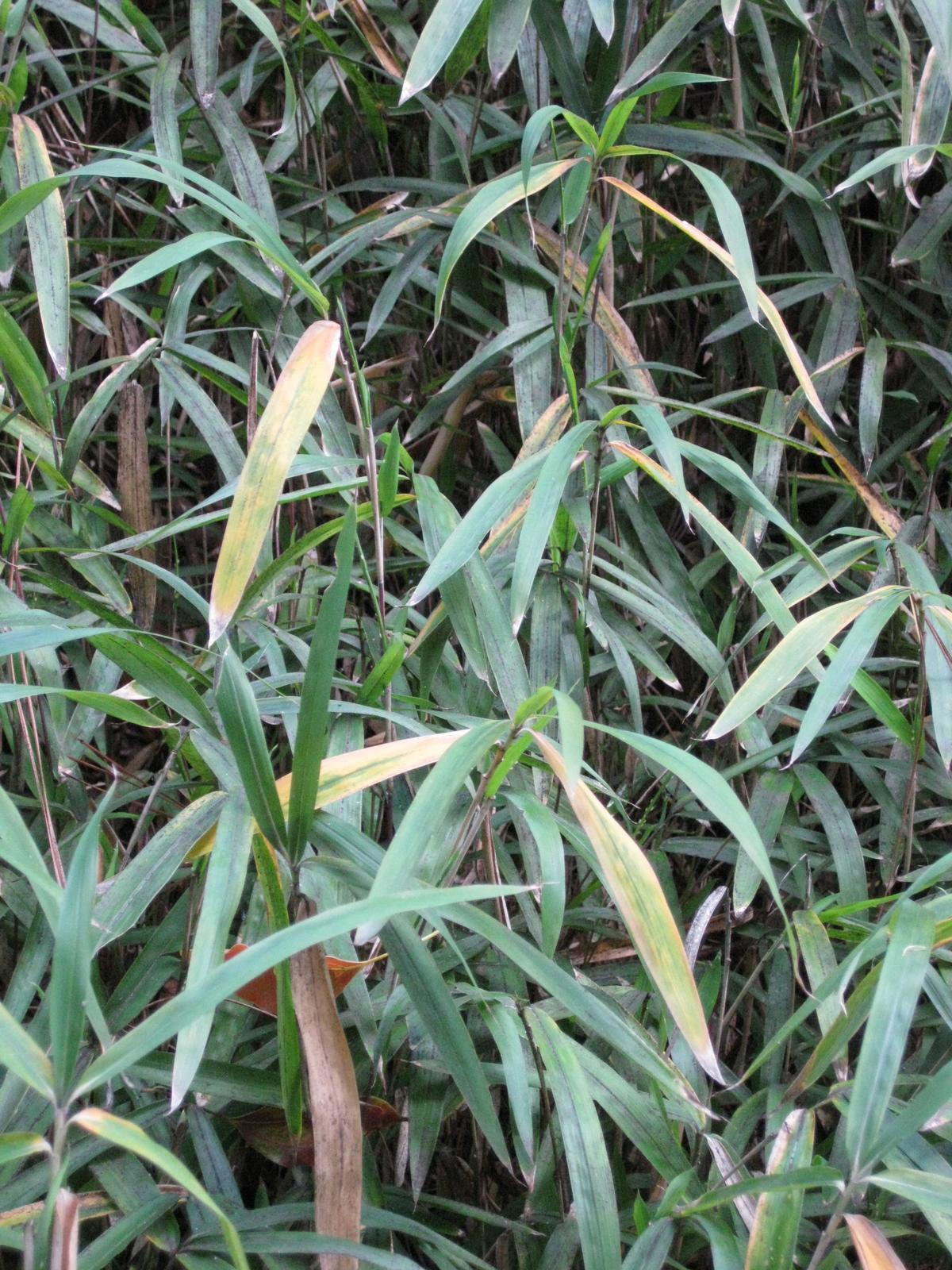
- A non-variegated specimen

Scientific classification
- Kingdom: Plantae
- Clade: Embryophytes
- Clade: Tracheophytes
- Clade: Angiosperms
- Clade: Monocots
- Clade: Commelinids
- Order: Poales
- Family: Poaceae
- Genus: Pleioblastus
- Species: P. fortunei

Binomial name
- Pleioblastus fortunei (Van Houtte) Nakai

Synonyms
- List: Arundarbor fortunei (Van Houtte) Kuntze; Arundarbor pygmaea (Miq.) Kuntze; Arundinaria fortunei (Van Houtte) Rivière; Arundinaria fortunei f. glabra (Makino) Demoly; Arundinaria variegata (J.J.Veitch) Makino; Arundinaria variegata f. glabra Makino; Bambusa fortunei Van Houtte; Bambusa maximowiczii Munro; Bambusa picta Siebold & Zucc. ex Munro; Bambusa pygmaea Miq.; Bambusa variegata J.J.Veitch; Nipponocalamus dimorphophyllus (Koidz.) Nakai; Nipponocalamus fortunei (Van Houtte) Nakai; Nipponocalamus pygmaeus (Miq.) Nakai; Nipponocalamus ramosissimus (Nakai) Nakai; Nipponocalamus shibuyanus (Makino ex Nakai) Nakai; Nipponocalamus tosaensis (Koidz.) Nakai; Nipponocalamus tsukubensis (Nakai) Nakai; Nipponocalamus uyenoensis (Nakai) Nakai; Nipponocalamus yasuianus (Koidz.) Nakai; Nipponocalamus yoshidake (Nakai) Honda; Pleioblastus argenteostriatus f. glaber (Makino) Murata; Pleioblastus dimorphophyllus Koidz.; Pleioblastus pubescens (Makino) Nakai; Pleioblastus pygmaeus (Miq.) Nakai; Pleioblastus pygmaeus f. ramosissimus (Nakai) Sad.Suzuki; Pleioblastus ramosissimus Nakai; Pleioblastus shibuyanus Makino ex Nakai; Pleioblastus shibuyanus var. basihirsutus Sad.Suzuki; Pleioblastus shibuyanus f. pubescens (Makino) Sad.Suzuki; Pleioblastus tectus Koidz.; Pleioblastus tosaensis Koidz.; Pleioblastus tsukubensis Nakai; Pleioblastus uyenoensis Nakai; Pleioblastus variegatus (J.J.Veitch) Makino; Pleioblastus yasuianus Koidz.; Pleioblastus yoshidake Nakai; Pseudosasa variegata (J.J.Veitch) Nakai; Sasa fortunei (Van Houtte) Fiori; Sasa variegata (J.J.Veitch) E.G.Camus

= Pleioblastus fortunei =

Species of plant

Pleioblastus fortunei is a species of bamboo in the family Poaceae. It is native to central and southern Japan, and has been introduced to southeast China, the North and South Islands of New Zealand, Maryland, Virginia, and the District of Columbia in the United States, Columbia, South East Brazil and India. It is hardy to −10 °F (−23 °C); USDA Hardiness zone 6a. It is an invasive species, escaping from cultivation and difficult to control, even surviving mowing. As its synonym Pleioblastus variegatus, dwarf white-striped bamboo, a variegated morph, has gained the Royal Horticultural Society's Award of Garden Merit.
