= Fargesia daminiu =

Scientific classification
- Kingdom: Plantae
- Clade: Tracheophytes
- Clade: Angiosperms
- Clade: Monocots
- Clade: Commelinids
- Order: Poales
- Family: Poaceae
- Genus: Fargesia
- Species: F. daminiu

Binomial name
- Fargesia daminiu T.P.Yi & J.Y.Shi

Species of plant

Fargesia daminiu is a species of bamboo in the family Poaceae, native to Tibet. It is a clumping perennial reaching 2 m (7 ft).
