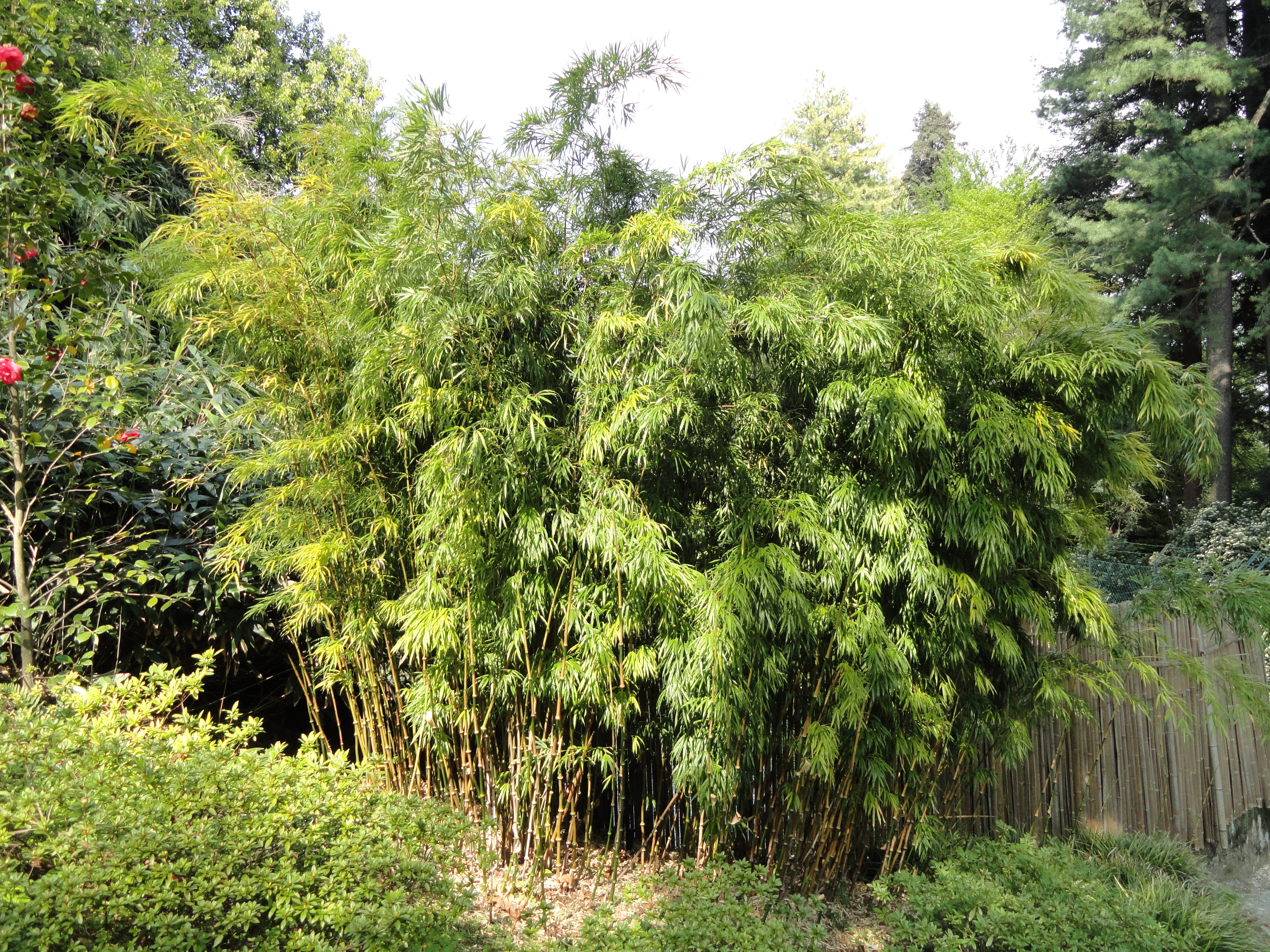
- Chimonobambusa tumidinoda

Scientific classification
- Kingdom: Plantae
- Clade: Tracheophytes
- Clade: Angiosperms
- Clade: Monocots
- Clade: Commelinids
- Order: Poales
- Family: Poaceae
- Subfamily: Bambusoideae
- Tribe: Arundinarieae
- Subtribe: Arundinariinae
- Genus: Chimonobambusa; Makino

Type species
- Chimonobambusa marmorea (Mitford) Makino

Synonyms
- Oreocalamus Keng; Qiongzhuea Hsueh f. & T.P.Yi; Menstruocalamus T.P.Yi; Yuezhuea T.P.Yi

= Chimonobambusa =

Genus of grasses

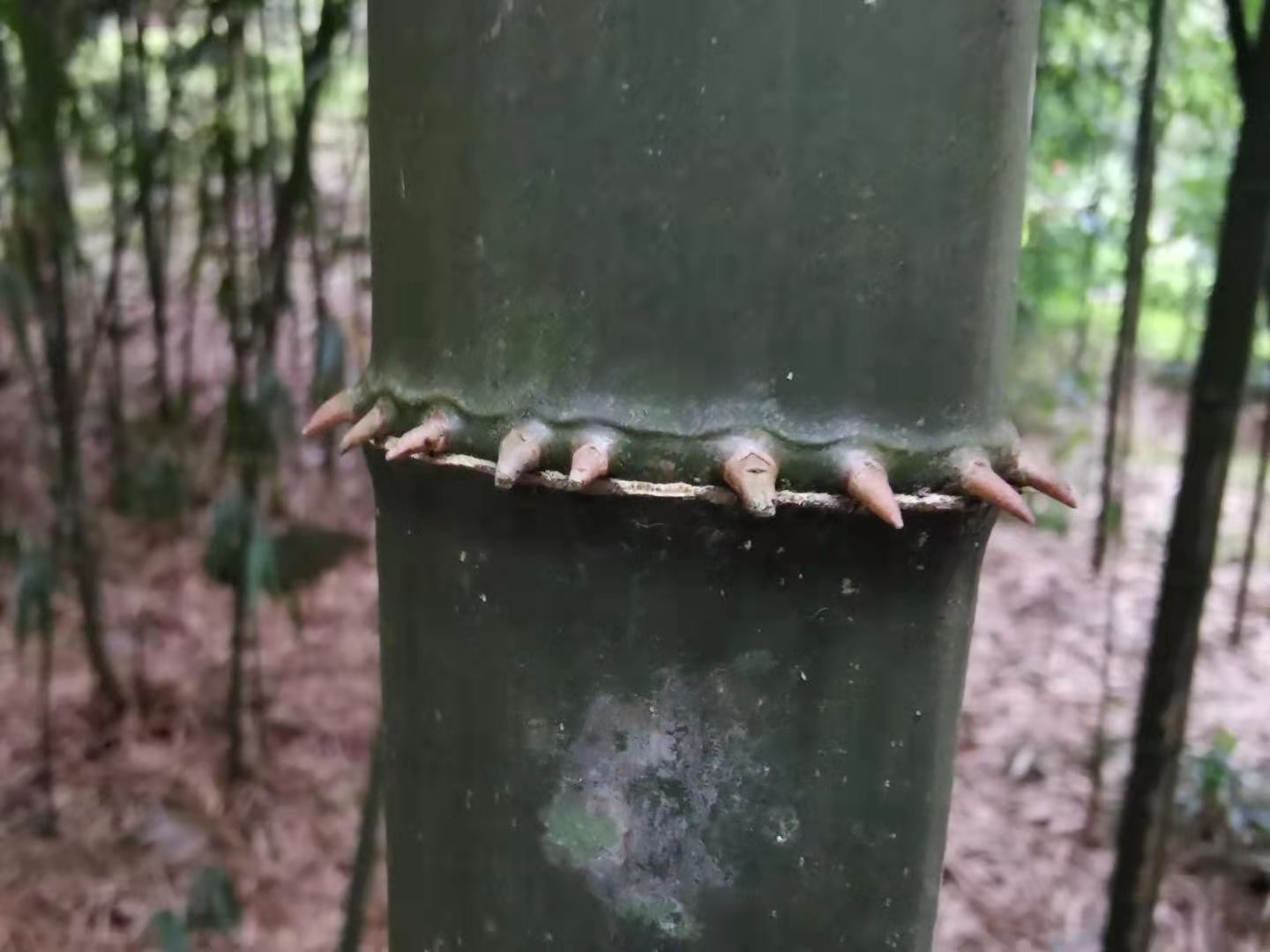
Chimonobambusa quadrangularis. Bamboo poles appear to be cylindrical like ordinary bamboos, but they are square to the touch. Native to China.

Chimonobambusa is a genus of East Asian bamboo in the grass family. They are native to China, Japan, Vietnam, Myanmar, and the Himalayas.

Species

1. Chimonobambusa angustifolia
2. Chimonobambusa armata – Burmese square bamboo
3. Chimonobambusa arunachalensis
4. Chimonobambusa brevinoda
5. Chimonobambusa callosa
6. Chimonobambusa communis
7. Chimonobambusa convoluta
8. Chimonobambusa damingshanensis
9. Chimonobambusa fansipanensis
10. Chimonobambusa gracilis
11. Chimonobambusa grandifolia
12. Chimonobambusa hejiangensis
13. Chimonobambusa hirtinoda
14. Chimonobambusa hookeriana
15. Chimonobambusa hsuehiana
16. Chimonobambusa intermedia
17. Chimonobambusa jainiana
18. Chimonobambusa jainii
19. Chimonobambusa lactistriata
20. Chimonobambusa leishanensis
21. Chimonobambusa luzhiensis
22. Chimonobambusa macrophylla – large-leaved Qiong bamboo
23. Chimonobambusa marmorea – marble bamboo
24. Chimonobambusa metuoensis
25. Chimonobambusa microfloscula
26. Chimonobambusa montigena
27. Chimonobambusa ningnanica
28. Chimonobambusa opienensis
29. Chimonobambusa pachystachys
30. Chimonobambusa paucispinosa
31. Chimonobambusa puberula
32. Chimonobambusa pubescens
33. Chimonobambusa purpurea
34. Chimonobambusa quadrangularis
35. Chimonobambusa rigidula
36. Chimonobambusa szechuanensis
37. Chimonobambusa tianquanensis
38. Chimonobambusa tuberculata
39. Chimonobambusa tumidissinoda – Chinese walking stick bamboo
40. Chimonobambusa unffolia
41. Chimonobambusa utilis
42. Chimonobambusa verruculosa

formerly included

see Ampelocalamus Bambusa Chimonocalamus Drepanostachyum Himalayacalamus Vietnamosasa Yushania

- Chimonobambusa angulata – Bambusa tuldoides
- Chimonobambusa baviensis – Chimonocalamus baviensis
- Chimonobambusa densifolia – Yushania densifolia
- Chimonobambusa falcata – Drepanostachyum falcatum
- Chimonobambusa gallatlyi – Chimonocalamus gallatlyi
- Chimonobambusa griffithiana – Chimonocalamus griffithianus
- Chimonobambusa hookeriana – Himalayacalamus hookerianus
- Chimonobambusa intermedia – Drepanostachyum intermedium
- Chimonobambusa jainiana – Ampelocalamus patellaris
- Chimonobambusa jaunsarensis – Yushania anceps
- Chimonobambusa khasiana – Drepanostachyum khasianum
- Chimonobambusa naibunensis – Ampelocalamus naibunensis
- Chimonobambusa polystachya – Drepanostachyum polystachyum
- Chimonobambusa pusilla – Vietnamosasa pusilla
