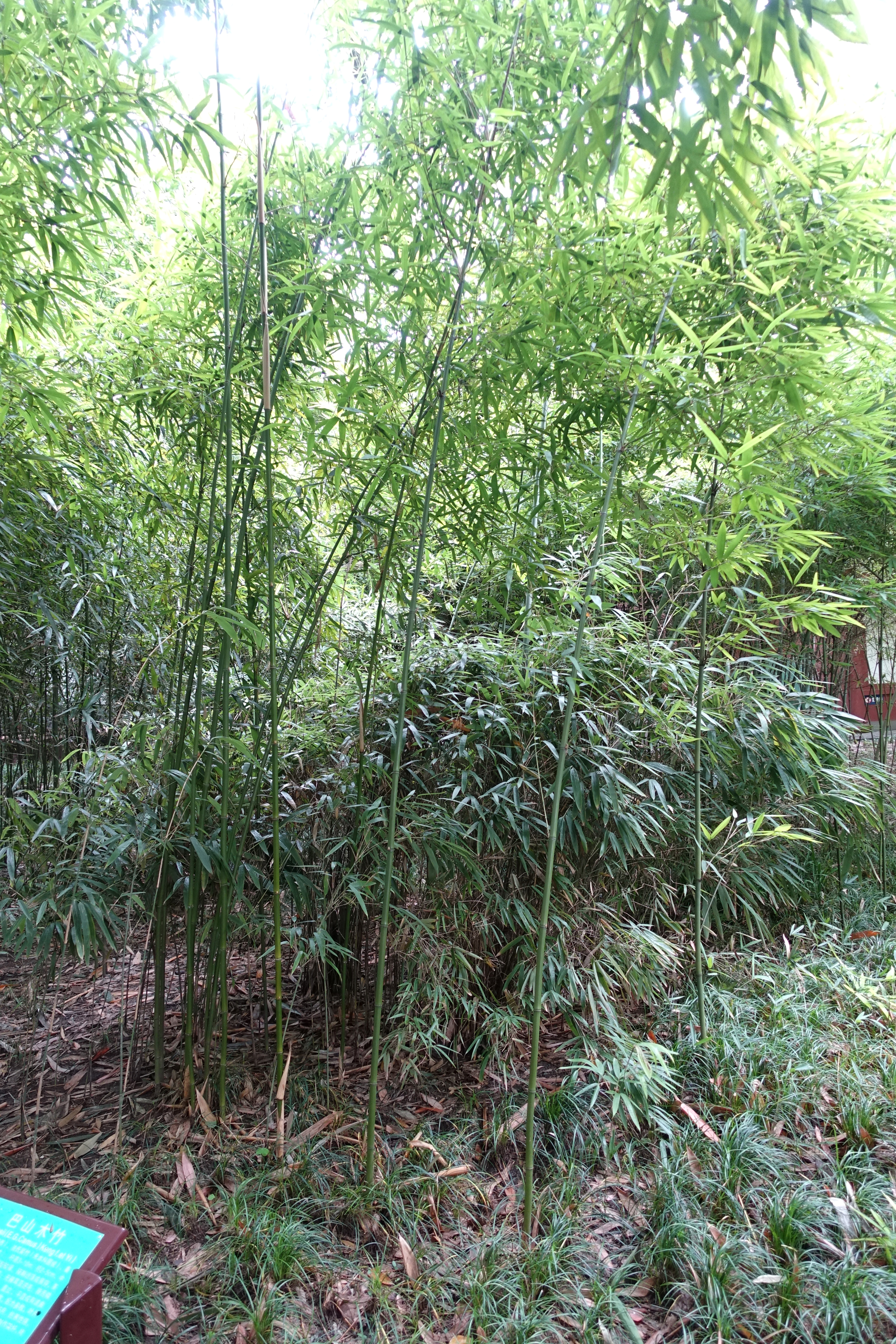
- Bashania fargesii

Scientific classification
- Kingdom: Plantae
- Clade: Embryophytes
- Clade: Tracheophytes
- Clade: Spermatophytes
- Clade: Angiosperms
- Clade: Monocots
- Clade: Commelinids
- Order: Poales
- Family: Poaceae
- Subfamily: Bambusoideae
- Tribe: Arundinarieae
- Subtribe: Arundinariinae
- Genus: Bashania; P. C. Keng & T. P. Yi

Synonyms
- Arundinaria subg. Bashania (P. C. Keng & T. P. Yi) D. Z. Li

= Bashania =

Species of plant

Bashania is a genus of East Asian bamboo in the grass family, native to China and Vietnam.

Species

1. Bashania abietina T.P.Yi & L.Yang – Sichuan
2. Bashania fansipanensis T.Q.Nguyen – Vietnam
3. Bashania fargesii (E.G.Camus) Keng f. & T.P.Yi – Gansu, Hubei, Shaanxi, Sichuan
4. Bashania qingchengshanensis Keng f. & T.P.Yi – Sichuan

formerly included

see Indocalamus Sarocalamus

- Bashania auctiaurita – Indocalamus longiauritus
- Bashania faberi – Sarocalamus faberi
- Bashania fangiana – Sarocalamus faberi
- Bashania spanostachya – Sarocalamus spanostachyus
- Bashania victorialis – Indocalamus victorialis
