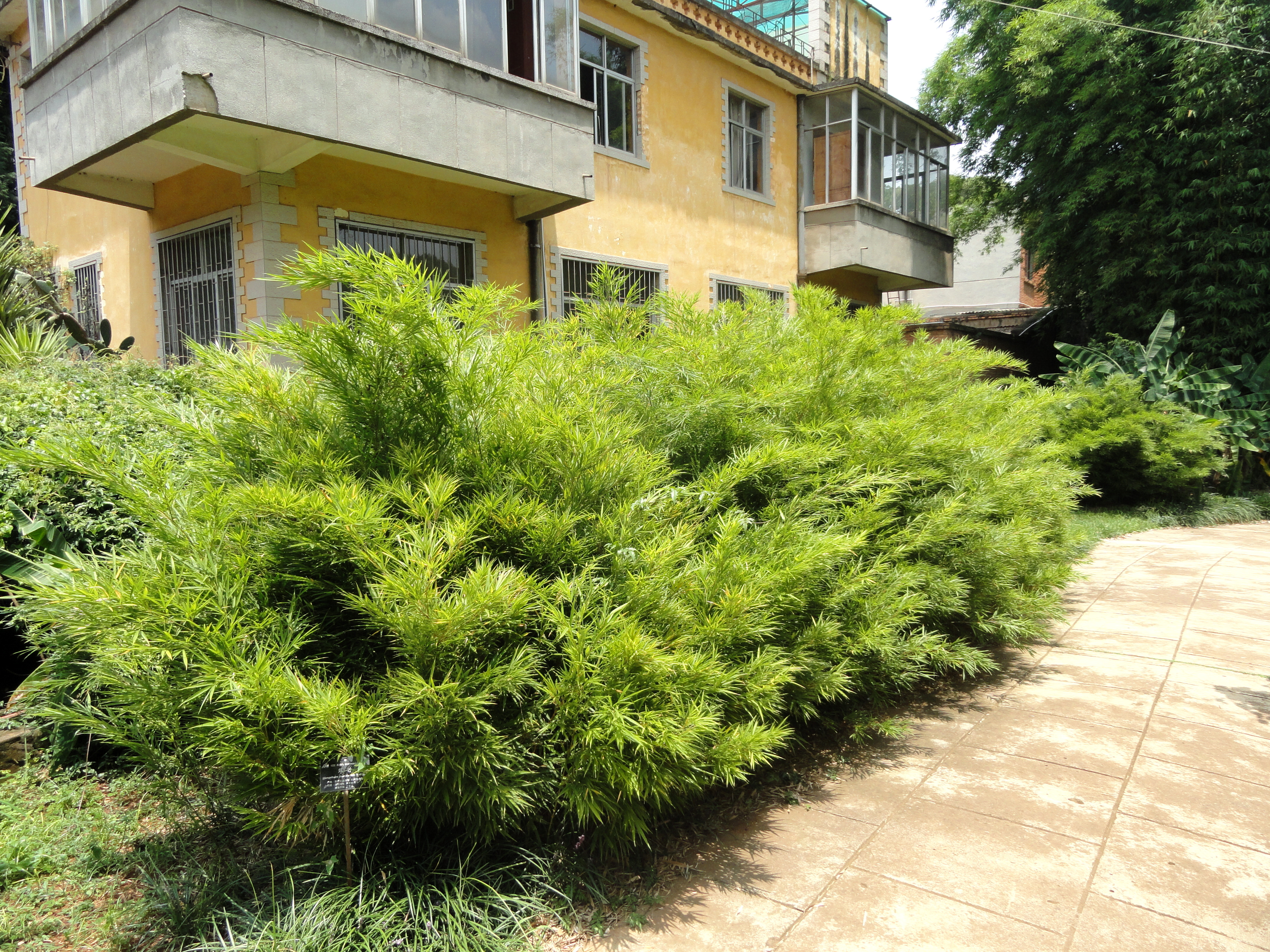

Scientific classification
- Kingdom: Plantae
- Clade: Tracheophytes
- Clade: Angiosperms
- Clade: Monocots
- Clade: Commelinids
- Order: Poales
- Family: Poaceae
- Genus: Chimonobambusa
- Species: C. tumidissinoda

Binomial name
- Chimonobambusa tumidissinoda Ohrnb.

= Chimonobambusa tumidissinoda =

Species of grass

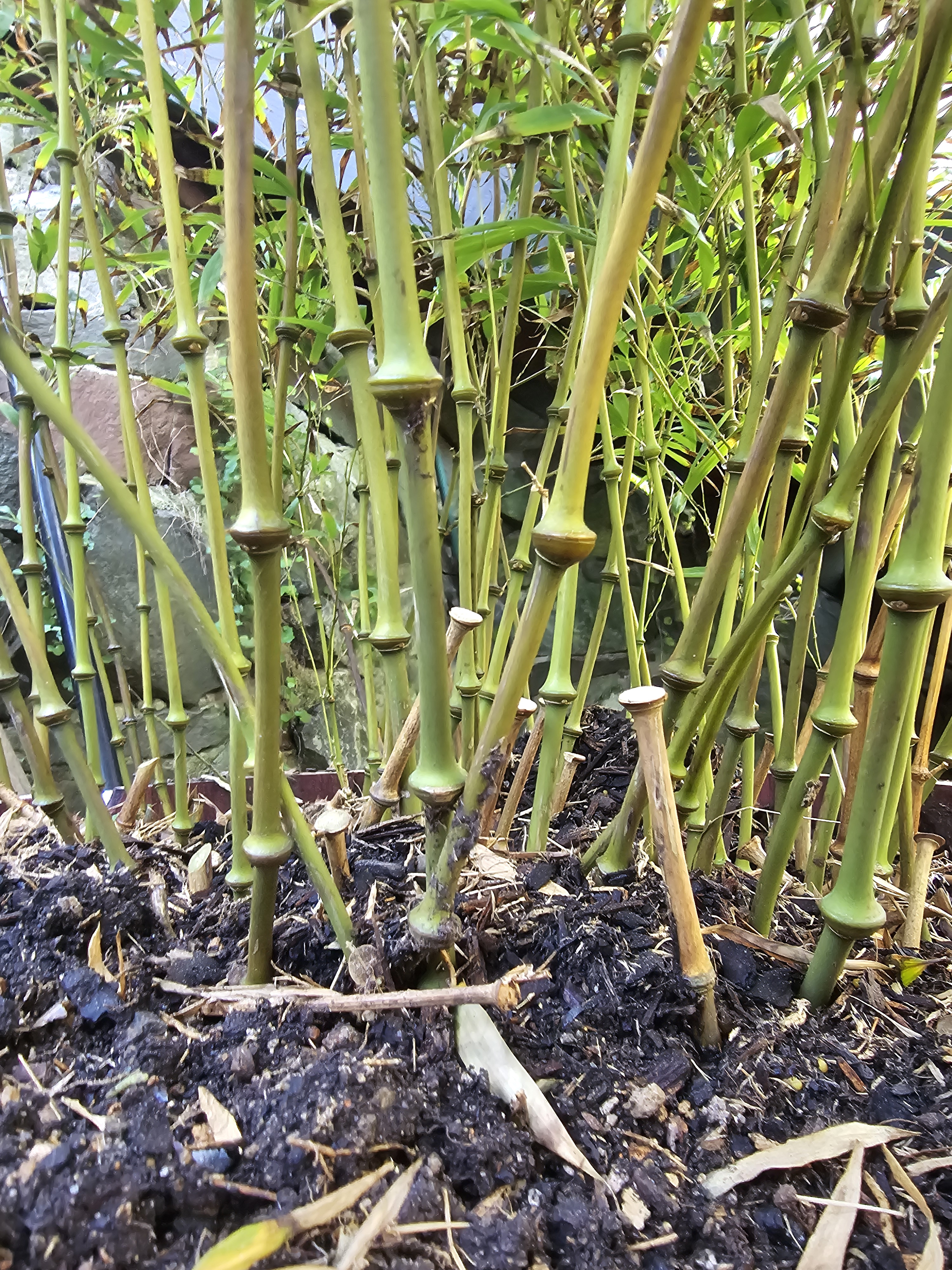
The swollen disk-like nodes of Chimonobambusa tumidissinoda culms

Chimonobambusa tumidissinoda (Chinese: 筇竹, commonly called walking stick bamboo) is a bamboo species, endemic to southwest Sichuan and northeast Yunnan, China, that has been used for walking sticks since the Han dynasty. Its culms are 2.5–6 meters in height and 1–3 cm in diameter, with large and greatly swollen disk-like nodes. Although it has been utilized since the Han dynasty (some 1200 years ago) it somehow escaped scientific description until 1980.

== Synonyms ==
- Chimonobambusa tumidinoda T.H.Wen
- Qiongzhuea tumidinoda Hsueh & T.P.Yi
- Qiongzhuea tumidissinoda (Ohrnb.) Hsueh f. & T.P.Yi
