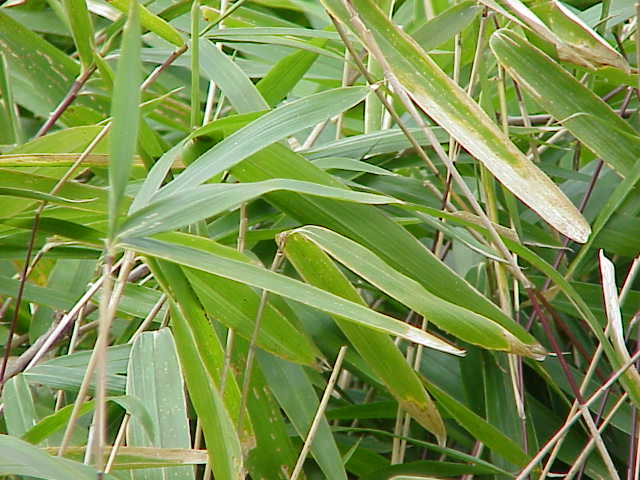
- Arundinaria pumila

Scientific classification
- Kingdom: Plantae
- Clade: Tracheophytes
- Clade: Angiosperms
- Clade: Monocots
- Clade: Commelinids
- Order: Poales
- Family: Poaceae
- Clade: BOP clade
- Subfamily: Bambusoideae
- Tribe: Arundinarieae; Asch. & Graebn. (1902)
- Subtribe: Arundinariinae; Nees ex Lindl. (1836)

Genera
- 30 genera, see text

Synonyms
- Chimonocalameae Keng f. (1982, nom. inval.); Shibataeeae Nakai (1933)

= Arundinarieae =

Tribe of grasses

Arundinarieae is a tribe of bamboo in the grass family (Poaceae) containing a single subtribe, Arundinariinae, and 31 genera. These woody bamboos occur in areas with warm temperate climates in southeastern North America, Subsaharan Africa, South Asia and East Asia. The tribe forms a lineage independent of the tropical woody bamboos (Bambuseae) and the tropical herbaceous bamboos (Olyreae).

== Genera ==
- Acidosasa
- Ampelocalamus
- Arundinaria
- Bashania
- Bergbambos
- Chimonobambusa
- Chimonocalamus
- Drepanostachyum
- Fargesia
- Ferrocalamus
- Gaoligongshania
- Gelidocalamus
- Himalayacalamus
- Indocalamus
- Indosasa
- Kuruna
- Oldeania
- Oligostachyum
- Phyllostachys
- Pleioblastus
- Pseudosasa
- Sarocalamus
- Sasa
- Sasaella
- Sasamorpha
- Semiarundinaria
- Shibataea
- Sinobambusa
- Sinosasa
- Thamnocalamus
- Tongpeia
- Vietnamocalamus
- Yushania
