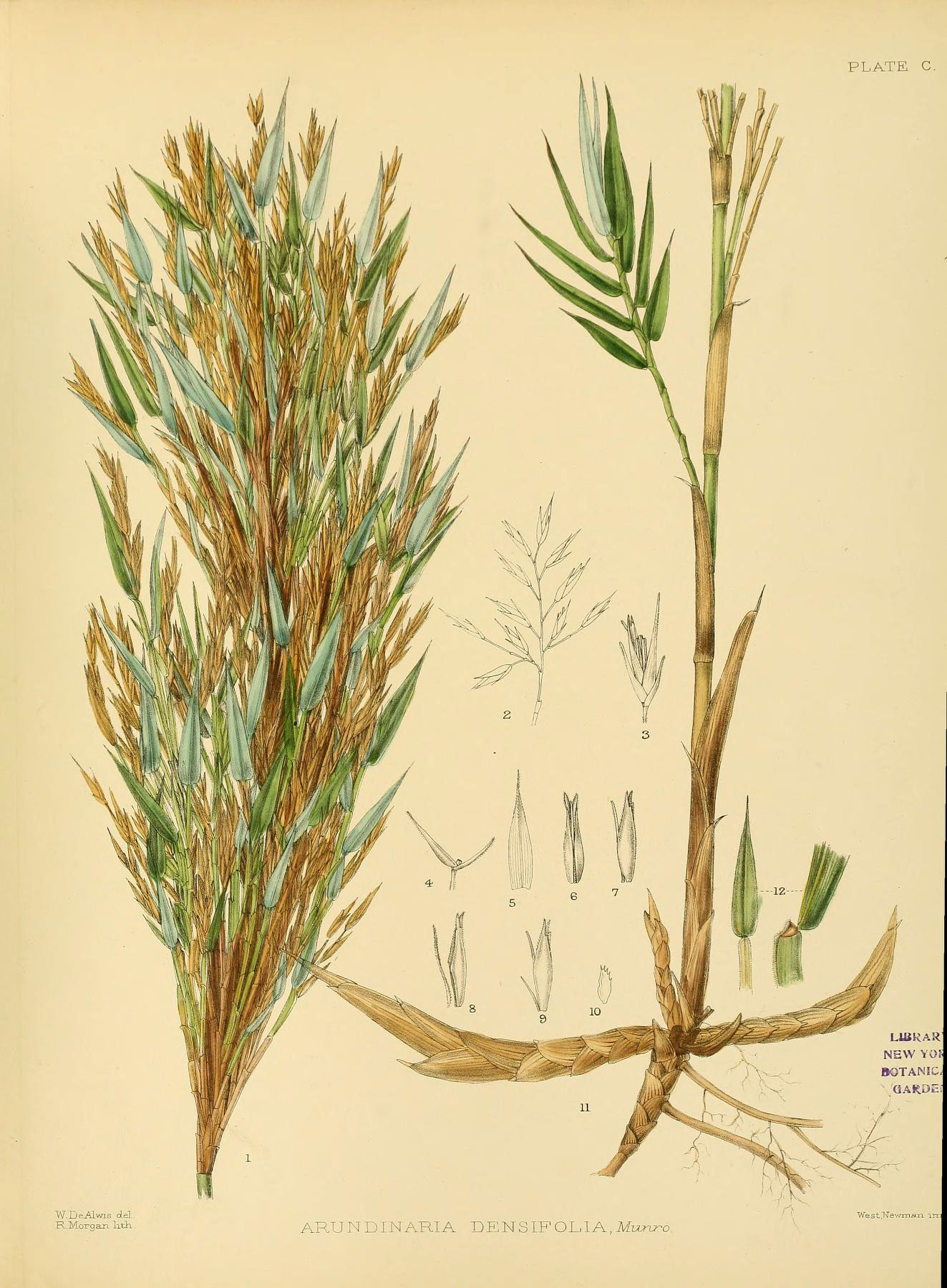

Scientific classification
- Kingdom: Plantae
- Clade: Tracheophytes
- Clade: Angiosperms
- Clade: Monocots
- Clade: Commelinids
- Order: Poales
- Family: Poaceae
- Subfamily: Bambusoideae
- Tribe: Arundinarieae
- Subtribe: Arundinariinae
- Genus: Kuruna; Attigala, Kaththr. & L.G.Clark

= Kuruna =

Genus of plants

Kuruna is a genus of flowering plants belonging to the family Poaceae.

Its native range is Southern India, Sri Lanka.

Species:

- Kuruna debilis (Thwaites) Attigala, Kaththr. & L.G.Clark
- Kuruna densifolia (Munro) Attigala, Kaththr. & L.G.Clark
- Kuruna floribunda (Thwaites) Attigala, Kaththr. & L.G.Clark
- Kuruna scandens (Soderstr. & R.P.Ellis) Attigala, Kaththr. & L.G.Clark
- Kuruna serrulata Attigala, Kathr. & L.G.Clark
- Kuruna walkeriana (Munro) Attigala, Kaththr. & L.G.Clark
- Kuruna wightiana (Nees) Attigala, Kathr. & L.G.Clark
