= Ravenochloa =

Scientific classification
- Kingdom: Plantae
- Clade: Tracheophytes
- Clade: Angiosperms
- Clade: Monocots
- Clade: Commelinids
- Order: Poales
- Family: Poaceae
- Subfamily: Bambusoideae
- Tribe: Arundinarieae
- Subtribe: Arundinariinae
- Genus: Ravenochloa; D.Z.Li & Y.X.Zhang
- Species: R. wilsonii

Binomial name
- Ravenochloa wilsonii (Rendle) D.Z.Li & Y.X.Zhang

Synonyms
- Arundinaria wilsonii Rendle (1904) (basionym); Indocalamus nubigenus (Keng f.) T.P.Yi ex H.R.Zhao & Y.L.Yang; Indocalamus shimenensis B.M.Yang; Indocalamus wilsonii (Rendle) C.S.Chao & C.D.Chu; Sasa nubigena Keng f.; Sasamorpha nubigena (Keng f.) Keng f.

Genus of bamboo

Ravenochloa is a genus of bamboo. It includes a single species, Ravenochloa wilsonii, which is native to Guizhou, Hubei, and Chongqing in south-central China.

The genus is named in honor of Peter H. Raven, an American botanist and environmentalist who served as foreign member of the Chinese Academy of Sciences and co- Editor-in-Chief of the Flora of China.
