= Sinosasa =

Scientific classification
- Kingdom: Plantae
- Clade: Tracheophytes
- Clade: Angiosperms
- Clade: Monocots
- Clade: Commelinids
- Order: Poales
- Family: Poaceae
- Subfamily: Bambusoideae
- Tribe: Arundinarieae
- Subtribe: Arundinariinae
- Genus: Sinosasa; L.C.Chia ex N.H.Xia, Q.M.Qin & Y.H.Tong

Genus of bamboo

Sinosasa is a genus of bamboo. It includes eight species native to southern China.

== Species ==
Eight species are accepted.

- Sinosasa fanjingshanensis N.H.Xia, Q.M.Qin & J.B.Ni
- Sinosasa gracilis (B.M.Yang) N.H.Xia, Y.H.Tong, J.B.Ni & Xing Li
- Sinosasa guangxiensis (C.D.Chu & C.S.Chao) N.H.Xia, Q.M.Qin & X.R.Zheng
- Sinosasa huapingensis N.H.Xia, Q.M.Qin & Y.H.Tong
- Sinosasa longiligulata (McClure) N.H.Xia, Q.M.Qin & J.B.Ni
- Sinosasa magninoda (T.H.Wen & G.L.Liao) N.H.Xia, Q.M.Qin & X.R.Zheng
- Sinosasa mingyueshanensis N.H.Xia, Q.M.Qin & X.R.Zheng
- Sinosasa polytricha N.H.Xia, Q.M.Qin & X.R.Zheng
