= Ferrocalamus =

Iron bamboo

Scientific classification
- Kingdom: Plantae
- Clade: Tracheophytes
- Clade: Angiosperms
- Clade: Monocots
- Clade: Commelinids
- Order: Poales
- Family: Poaceae
- Subfamily: Bambusoideae
- Tribe: Arundinarieae
- Subtribe: Arundinariinae
- Genus: Ferrocalamus; J.R.Xue & Keng.f.

Genus of grasses

Ferrocalamus, or iron bamboo, is a genus of Chinese bamboo in the grass family. It is endemic to China. The plant is known only from southern Yunnan, at elevations of 900 to 1,200 m above sea level.

== Taxonomy ==
The genus Ferrocalamus is related to Indocalamus. However, Ferrocalamus is tree-like while Indocalamus is a shrub.

== Description ==
Ferrocalamus are perennial shrubby bamboos having erect culms. The culms are about 5–9 m long with 20–50 mm diameter. The internodes are long, thick walled, with a ring of white hairs below the nodes. Culm sheaths are persistent, leathery at base, thinner at apex. The auricles are small or absent. The leaf blade is large with transverse venation. Inflorescence is a large panicle on leafy flowering branches. It has 3 stamens with free filaments. Ovary is glabrous having short styles short, with 2 stigmas. Fruit is rounded berry-like, succulent with thickened, fleshy pericarp but without hardened endocarp.

== Species ==
- Ferrocalamus fibrillosus
- Ferrocalamus rimosivaginus
- Ferrocalamus strictus

== Uses ==
In the past, the culms were commonly used for making arrows.
