= Ampelocalamus scandens =

Scientific classification
- Kingdom: Plantae
- Clade: Tracheophytes
- Clade: Angiosperms
- Clade: Monocots
- Clade: Commelinids
- Order: Poales
- Family: Poaceae
- Genus: Ampelocalamus
- Species: A. scandens

Binomial name
- Ampelocalamus scandens Hsueh & W.D.Li

Synonyms
- Drepanostachyum scandens (Hsueh & W.D.Li) Keng f. ex T.P.Yi

Species of grass

Ampelocalamus scandens is a species of bamboo native to the Guizhou province of China. It can reach heights of 10 m and a stem diameter of 0.8 cm and grows at an altitude of between 265 – 320m.
