= Sasamorpha =

Scientific classification
- Kingdom: Plantae
- Clade: Tracheophytes
- Clade: Angiosperms
- Clade: Monocots
- Clade: Commelinids
- Order: Poales
- Family: Poaceae
- Subfamily: Bambusoideae
- Tribe: Arundinarieae
- Subtribe: Arundinariinae
- Genus: Sasamorpha; Nakai

Type species
- Arundinaria purpurascens Hack.

Synonyms
- Sasa subgen. Sasamorpha (Nakai) C.H.Hu

Genus of grasses

Sasamorpha is a genus of East Asian bamboo in the grass family.

Species

1. Sasamorpha borealis (Hack.) Nakai – Korea, Japan, Sakhalin
2. Sasamorpha hubeiensis C.H.Hu – Hubei, Jiangxi
3. Sasamorpha oshidensis (Makino & Uchida) Nakai – Japan
4. Sasamorpha qingyuanensis C.H.Hu – Zhejiang
5. Sasamorpha sinica (Keng) Koidz. – Anhui, Zhejiang

Formerly included

several species now considered better suited to other genera: Indocalamus, Sasa.
