= Yushania elegans =

Scientific classification
- Kingdom: Plantae
- Clade: Embryophytes
- Clade: Tracheophytes
- Clade: Spermatophytes
- Clade: Angiosperms
- Clade: Monocots
- Clade: Commelinids
- Order: Poales
- Family: Poaceae
- Genus: Yushania
- Species: Y. elegans

Binomial name
- Yushania elegans (Kurz) R.B.Majumdar

Synonyms
- Arundinaria elegans Kurz; Burmabambus elegans (Kurz) Keng f.; Fargesia elegans (Kurz) Campb.; Sinarundinaria elegans (Kurz) C.S.Chao & Renvoize; Sinobambusa elegans (Kurz) Nakai

Species of grass

Yushania elegans is a species of bamboo in the family Poaceae. It is native to India, Bangladesh, and Myanmar.
