= Indosasa =

Scientific classification
- Kingdom: Plantae
- Clade: Tracheophytes
- Clade: Angiosperms
- Clade: Monocots
- Clade: Commelinids
- Order: Poales
- Family: Poaceae
- Subfamily: Bambusoideae
- Tribe: Arundinarieae
- Subtribe: Arundinariinae
- Genus: Indosasa; McClure

Type species
- Indosasa crassiflora McClure

Genus of grasses

Indosasa is a genus of East Asian bamboo in the grass family. The species are native to China and Indochina (Laos and Vietnam).

== Species ==
1. Indosasa angustata
2. Indosasa bacquangensis
3. Indosasa crassiflora
4. Indosasa gigantea
5. Indosasa glabrata
6. Indosasa hispida
7. Indosasa ingens
8. Indosasa jinpingensis
9. Indosasa laotica
10. Indosasa lipoensis
11. Indosasa longispicata
12. Indosasa lunata
13. Indosasa parvifolia
14. Indosasa patens
15. Indosasa shibataeaoides
16. Indosasa singulispicula
17. Indosasa sinica
18. Indosasa sondongensis
19. Indosasa spongiosa
20. Indosasa triangulata
