= Vietnamocalamus =

Scientific classification
- Kingdom: Plantae
- Clade: Tracheophytes
- Clade: Angiosperms
- Clade: Monocots
- Clade: Commelinids
- Order: Poales
- Family: Poaceae
- Subfamily: Bambusoideae
- Tribe: Arundinarieae
- Genus: Vietnamocalamus; T.Q.Nguyen (1991)
- Species: V. catbaensis

Binomial name
- Vietnamocalamus catbaensis T.Q.Nguyen (1991)

Genus of flowering plants

Vietnamocalamus is a genus of flowering plants belonging to the family Poaceae. It contains a single species, Vietnamocalamus catbaensis. It is a bamboo endemic to the Cát Bà Islands in Vietnam.
