= Yushania addingtonii =

Scientific classification
- Kingdom: Plantae
- Clade: Embryophytes
- Clade: Tracheophytes
- Clade: Angiosperms
- Clade: Monocots
- Clade: Commelinids
- Order: Poales
- Family: Poaceae
- Genus: Yushania
- Species: Y. addingtonii

Binomial name
- Yushania addingtonii Demoly

Synonyms
- Phyllostachys addingtonii (Demoly) D.L.Fu

Species of flowering plant

Yushania addingtonii is a species of bamboo in the family Poaceae. It is native to central and southwestern China.
