= Gaoligongshania =

Scientific classification
- Kingdom: Plantae
- Clade: Tracheophytes
- Clade: Angiosperms
- Clade: Monocots
- Clade: Commelinids
- Order: Poales
- Family: Poaceae
- Subfamily: Bambusoideae
- Tribe: Arundinarieae
- Subtribe: Arundinariinae
- Genus: Gaoligongshania; D.Z.Li, Hsueh & N.H.Xia
- Species: G. megalothyrsa

Binomial name
- Gaoligongshania megalothyrsa (Hand.-Mazz.) D.Z.Li, Hsueh & N.H.Xia

Synonyms
- Arundinaria megalothyrsa Handel-Mazzetti; Indocalamus megalothyrsus (Handel-Mazzetti) C. S. Chao & C. D. Chu; Monocladus megalothyrsus (Handel-Mazzetti) T. P. Yi; Yushania megalothyrsa (Handel-Mazzetti) T. H. Wen

Genus of grasses

Gaoligongshania megalothyrsa is a species of small, bushy mountain bamboo, in the monotypic genus Gaoligongshania. Like Ferrocalamus, this genus is found only in Yunnan Province of China, and near the Myanmar border, at an altitude of 1,600 to 2,200 m (5,200 to 7,200 ft). It is named after the Gaoligong Mountains, where it is endemic.

== Description ==
Gaoligongshania megalothyrsa is an annual or perennial small bamboo, having the culms 1 to 3.5 m long and about 1 cm in diameter. The internodes are 30–35 cm in distance. Culm sheaths are persistent, yellow or green-brown in colour. Along the internodes are leathery, dense, short and spiny hairs. The auricles are well-developed, and purple in colour. Leaf sheaths are covered by white powdery material; the leaf blade is oblong-lanceolate, with long transverse and parallel veins. Anthers are yellow about 5 mm in length. Ovary is oblong. New shoots are produced during April and May, and flowering time is in October.
