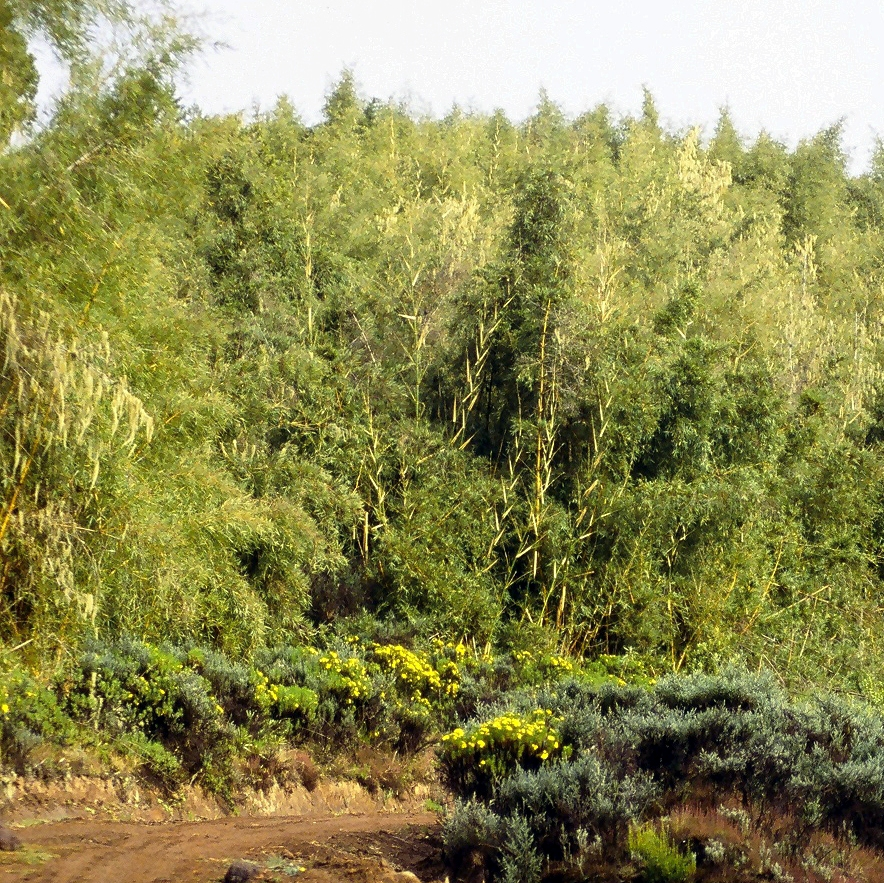
- Bamboo on Mount Kenya

Scientific classification
- Kingdom: Plantae
- Clade: Tracheophytes
- Clade: Angiosperms
- Clade: Monocots
- Clade: Commelinids
- Order: Poales
- Family: Poaceae
- Subfamily: Bambusoideae
- Tribe: Arundinarieae
- Subtribe: Arundinariinae
- Genus: Yushania; Keng f.

Type species
- Y. niitakayamensis Keng f.

Synonyms
- Burmabambus Keng f.; Butania Keng f.; Monospatha W.T.Lin

= Yushania =

Genus of grasses

Yushania is a genus of bamboo in the grass family.

Recent classification systems place Yushania in the tribe Arundinarieae.

The species of Yushania are evergreen, spreading, thornless bamboos native to Himalayan, African, Chinese, and Southeast Asian mountains at moderate to high altitudes, up to 3000 m.

Yushania contains species formerly classified as members of Arundinaria, as well as one species that is still considered to be a Sinarundinaria by some.

Some species of Yushania are popular to cultivate.

== Species ==
Yushania species include:

1. Yushania addingtonii Demoly, 2006 – South-Central China
2. Yushania ailuropodina T.P.Yi – South-Central China
3. Yushania anceps – (Mitford) W.C.Lin – West Himalaya
4. Yushania andropogonoides (Hand.-Mazz.) T.P.Yi – South-Central China
5. Yushania auctiaurita T.P.Yi – South-Central China
6. Yushania baishanzuensis – Z.P.Wang & G.H.Le – Southeastern China
7. Yushania basihirsuta (McClure) Z.P.Wang & G.H.Ye – Hirsute chinacane
8. Yushania bojieiana – T.P.Yi
9. Yushania boliana – Demoly
10. Yushania brevipaniculata – (McClure) T.P.Yi
11. Yushania brevis – T.P.Yi
12. Yushania canoviridis – Z.P.Wang & G.H.Ye
13. Yushania cartilaginea – T.H.Wen
14. Yushania cava – T.P.Yi
15. Yushania chingii – T.P.Yi
16. Yushania chungii – Z.P.Wang & G.H.Ye – Large arrow bamboo
17. Yushania collina – T.P.Yi
18. Yushania complanata – T.P.Yi
19. Yushania confusa – (McClure) Z.P.Wang & G.H.Ye
20. Yushania crassicollis – T.P.Yi
21. Yushania crispata – T.P.Yi
22. Yushania dafengdingensis – T.P.Yi
23. Yushania elegans – (Kurz) R.B.Majumdar
24. Yushania elevata – T.P.Yi
25. Yushania exilis – T.P.Yi
26. Yushania falcatiaurita – Hsueh & T.P.Yi
27. Yushania farcticaulis – T.P.Yi
28. Yushania farinosa – Z.P.Wang & G.H.Ye
29. Yushania flexa – T.P.Yi
30. Yushania gigantea T.P. Yi & L. Yang, 2014; 600–700 cm long.
31. Yushania glandulosa – Hsueh & T.P.Yi
32. Yushania glauca – T.P.Yi & T.L.Long
33. Yushania grammata – T.P.Yi
34. Yushania hirsuta – (Munro) R.B.Majumdar
35. Yushania hirticaulis – Z.P.Wang & G.H.Ye
36. Yushania lacera – Q.F.Zheng & K.F.Huang
37. Yushania laetevirens – T.P.Yi
38. Yushania levigata – T.P.Yi
39. Yushania lineolata – T.P.Yi
40. Yushania longiaurita – Q.F.Zheng & K.F.Huang
41. Yushania longiuscula – T.P.Yi
42. Yushania mabianensis – T.P.Yi
43. Yushania maculata – T.P.Yi
44. Yushania maling – (Gamble) R.B.Majumdar
45. Yushania menghaiensis – T.P.Yi
46. Yushania microphylla – (Munro) R.B.Majumdar
47. Yushania mitis – T.P.Yi
48. Yushania multiramea – T.P.Yi
49. Yushania niitakayamensis – (Hayata) Keng f. – Niitakayama cane, Yushan cane, Yushan Mountain cane
50. Yushania oblonga – T.P.Yi
51. Yushania pachyclada – T.P.Yi
52. Yushania pauciramificans – T.P.Yi
53. Yushania polytricha – Hsueh & T.P.Yi
54. Yushania punctulata – T.P.Yi
55. Yushania qiaojiaensis – Hsueh & T.P.Yi
56. Yushania rugosa – T.P.Yi
57. Yushania straminea – T.P.Yi
58. Yushania suijiangensis – T.P.Yi
59. Yushania uniramosa – Hsueh & T.P.Yi
60. Yushania varians – T.P.Yi
61. Yushania vigens – T.P.Yi
62. Yushania violascens – (Keng) T.P.Yi
63. Yushania weixiensis – T.P.Yi
64. Yushania wuyishanensis – Q.F.Zheng & K.F.Huang
65. Yushania xizangensis – T.P.Yi
66. Yushania yadongensis - T.P.Yi

Formerly included

see Chimonocalamus Drepanostachyum Fargesia Gelidocalamus Otatea Pseudosasa Sarocalamus

- Yushania acuminata – Otatea acuminata
- Yushania adpressa – Fargesia adpressa
- Yushania alpina — Oldeania alpina
- Yushania aztecorum – Otatea aztecorum
- Yushania baviensis – Chimonocalamus baviensis
- Yushania communis – Fargesia communis
- Yushania contracta – Fargesia contracta
- Yushania dura – Fargesia dura
- Yushania edulis – Fargesia edulis
- Yushania ferax – Fargesia ferax
- Yushania frigidis – Fargesia frigidis
- Yushania fungosa – Fargesia fungosa
- Yushania gongshanensis – Fargesia gongshanensis
- Yushania grossa – Fargesia grossa
- Yushania hainanensis – Fargesia hainanensis
- Yushania hsuehiana – Fargesia hsuehiana
- Yushania humilis – Pseudosasa humilis
- Yushania lanshanensis – Pseudosasa pubiflora
- Yushania lushuiensis – Fargesia lushuiensis
- Yushania macclureana – Fargesia macclureana
- Yushania mairei – Fargesia mairei
- Yushania monophylla – Gelidocalamus stellatus
- Yushania papyrifera – Fargesia papyrifera
- Yushania polystachya – Drepanostachyum polystachyum
- Yushania racemosa – Sarocalamus racemosus
- Yushania scabrida – Fargesia scabrida
- Yushania ungulata – Fargesia ungulata
- Yushania vicina – Fargesia vicina
- Yushania yunnanensis – Fargesia yunnanensis
