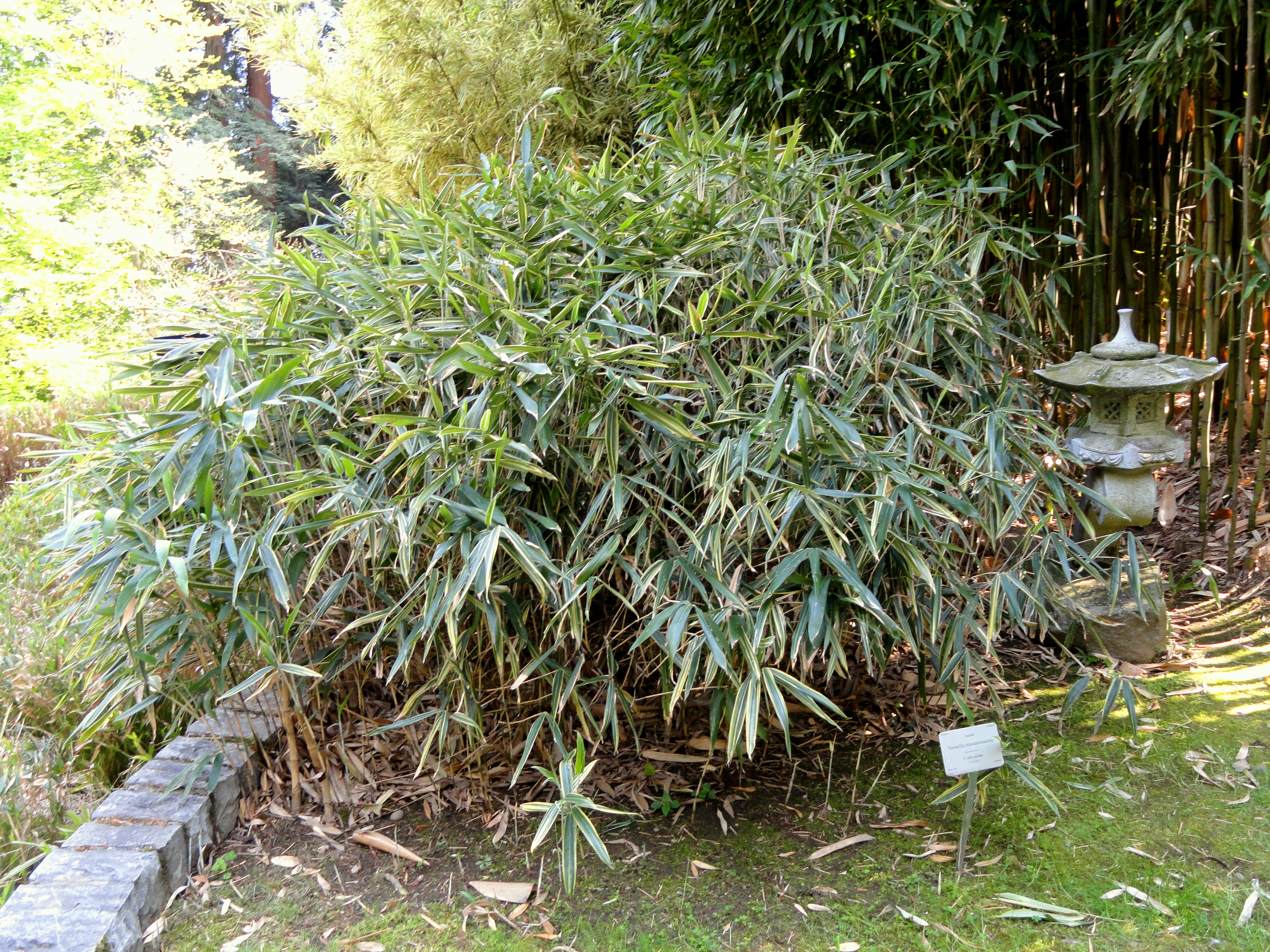
- Sasaella masamuneana

Scientific classification
- Kingdom: Plantae
- Clade: Tracheophytes
- Clade: Angiosperms
- Clade: Monocots
- Clade: Commelinids
- Order: Poales
- Family: Poaceae
- Subfamily: Bambusoideae
- Tribe: Arundinarieae
- Subtribe: Arundinariinae
- Genus: Sasaella; Makino

Type species
- Sasaella ramosa (Makino) Makino.

Synonyms
- Sasinaria Demoly

= Sasaella =

Genus of grasses

Sasaella is a genus of Japanese bamboo in the grass family.

Species

1. Sasaella bitchuensis (Makino) Koidz – southern Honshu
2. Sasaella caudiceps (Koidz.) Koidz. – Honshu
3. Sasaella hidaensis (Makino) Makino, Hishu zasa – Honshu, Shikoku
4. Sasaella kogasensis (Nakai) Nakai ex Koidz, Kogashi azuma zasa – Hokkaido, Honshu
5. Sasaella leucorhoda (Koidz.) Koidz. – Honshu
6. Sasaella masamuneana (Makino) Hatsushima & Muroi, Genkei chiku – Japan
7. Sasaella ramosa (Makino) Makino, Azuma zasa – Japan; naturalized in Great Britain + New Zealand
8. Sasaella sadoensis (Makino ex Koidz.) Sad.Suzuki – Honshu
9. Sasaella sawadae (Makino) Makino ex Koidzum – Honshu
10. Sasaella shiobarensis (Nakai) Koidz. – Honshu
11. Sasaella yamakitensis (Makino) M.Kobay. – Honshu

formerly included

species now included in other genera: Pleioblastus Sasa
