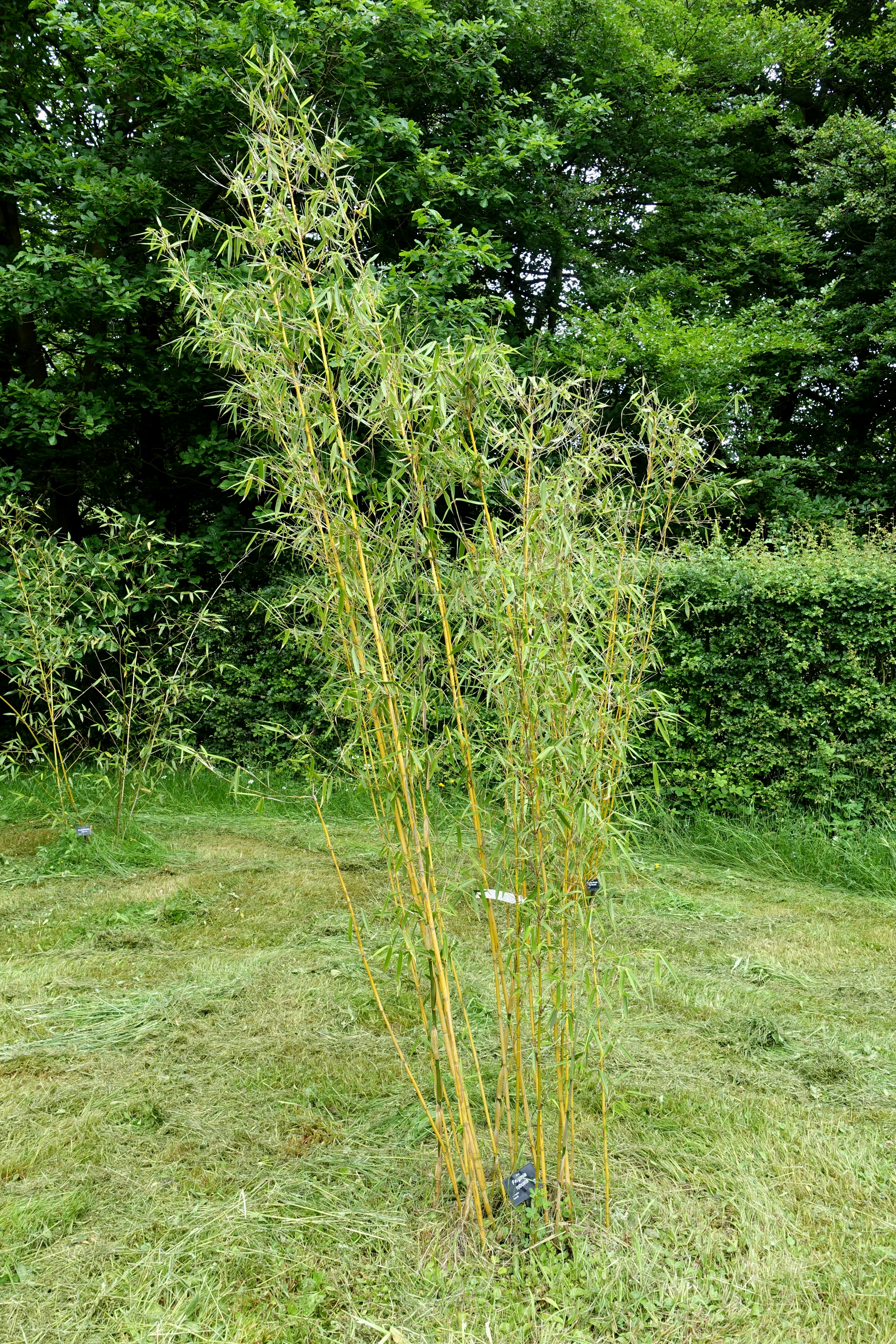
- At RHS Garden Harlow Carr

Scientific classification
- Kingdom: Plantae
- Clade: Embryophytes
- Clade: Tracheophytes
- Clade: Spermatophytes
- Clade: Angiosperms
- Clade: Monocots
- Clade: Commelinids
- Order: Poales
- Family: Poaceae
- Genus: Fargesia
- Species: F. robusta

Binomial name
- Fargesia robusta T.P.Yi

Synonyms
- Thamnocalamus robustus (T.P.Yi) Demoly

= Fargesia robusta =

Species of bamboo

Fargesia robusta is a species of clumping bamboo in the family Poaceae, native to Sichuan, China. Typically 3 m (10 ft) but reaching 4.5 m (15 ft), and with a narrow growth form, it has gained the Royal Horticultural Society's Award of Garden Merit as an ornamental. A number of cultivars are commercially available, including 'Campbell', 'Pingwu' (Green Screen is derived from 'Pingwu'), 'Wenchuan', and 'Wolong'.

It is a food source for giant pandas but grows at too low an elevation for them to exploit, unless there has been a die-off of their usual species. It is a member of the Fargesia spathacea species complex, and may not be a distinct species.
