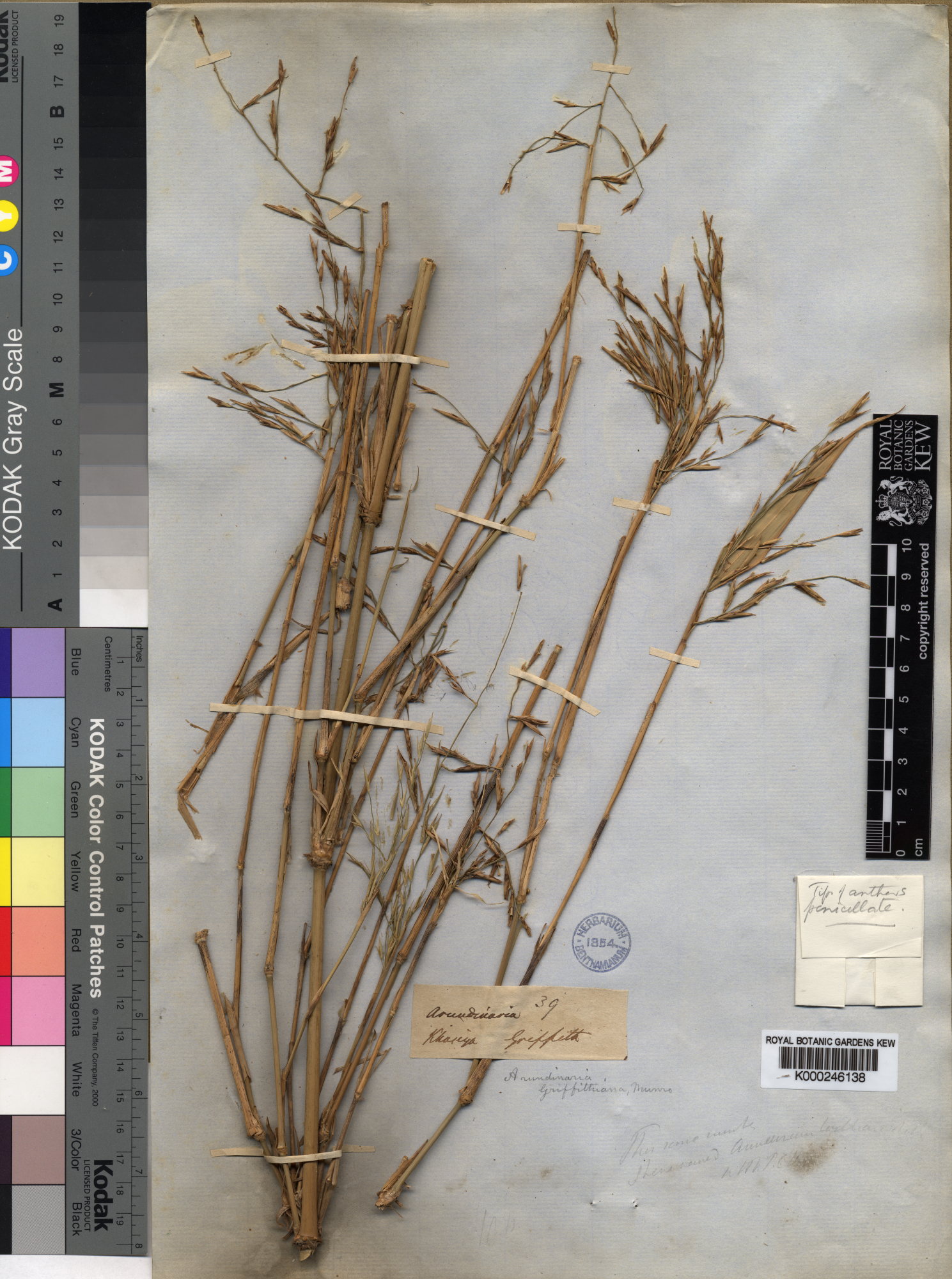
- Chimonocalamus griffithianus

Scientific classification
- Kingdom: Plantae
- Clade: Tracheophytes
- Clade: Angiosperms
- Clade: Monocots
- Clade: Commelinids
- Order: Poales
- Family: Poaceae
- Subfamily: Bambusoideae
- Tribe: Arundinarieae
- Subtribe: Arundinariinae
- Genus: Chimonocalamus; J.R.Xue & T.P.Yi

Synonyms
- Sinarundinaria section Chimonocalamus (Hsueh & T.P.Yi) C.S.Chao & Renvoize

= Chimonocalamus =

Genus of grasses

Chimonocalamus is a genus of Asian bamboo in the grass family. It is native to China, the eastern Himalayas, and northern Indochina. Some of the species are aromatic and grown as ornamental plants.

Species

1. Chimonocalamus baviensis
2. Chimonocalamus burmaensis
3. Chimonocalamus cibarius
4. Chimonocalamus delicatus
5. Chimonocalamus dumosus
6. Chimonocalamus fimbriatus
7. Chimonocalamus gallatlyi
8. Chimonocalamus griffithianus
9. Chimonocalamus longiligulatus
10. Chimonocalamus longispiculatus
11. Chimonocalamus longiusculus
12. Chimonocalamus lushaiensis
13. Chimonocalamus makuanensis
14. Chimonocalamus montanus
15. Chimonocalamus pallens
16. Chimonocalamus tortuosus

Formerly included

see Chimonobambusa

- Chimonocalamus armatus – Chimonobambusa armatus
- Chimonocalamus callosus – Chimonobambusa callosa
