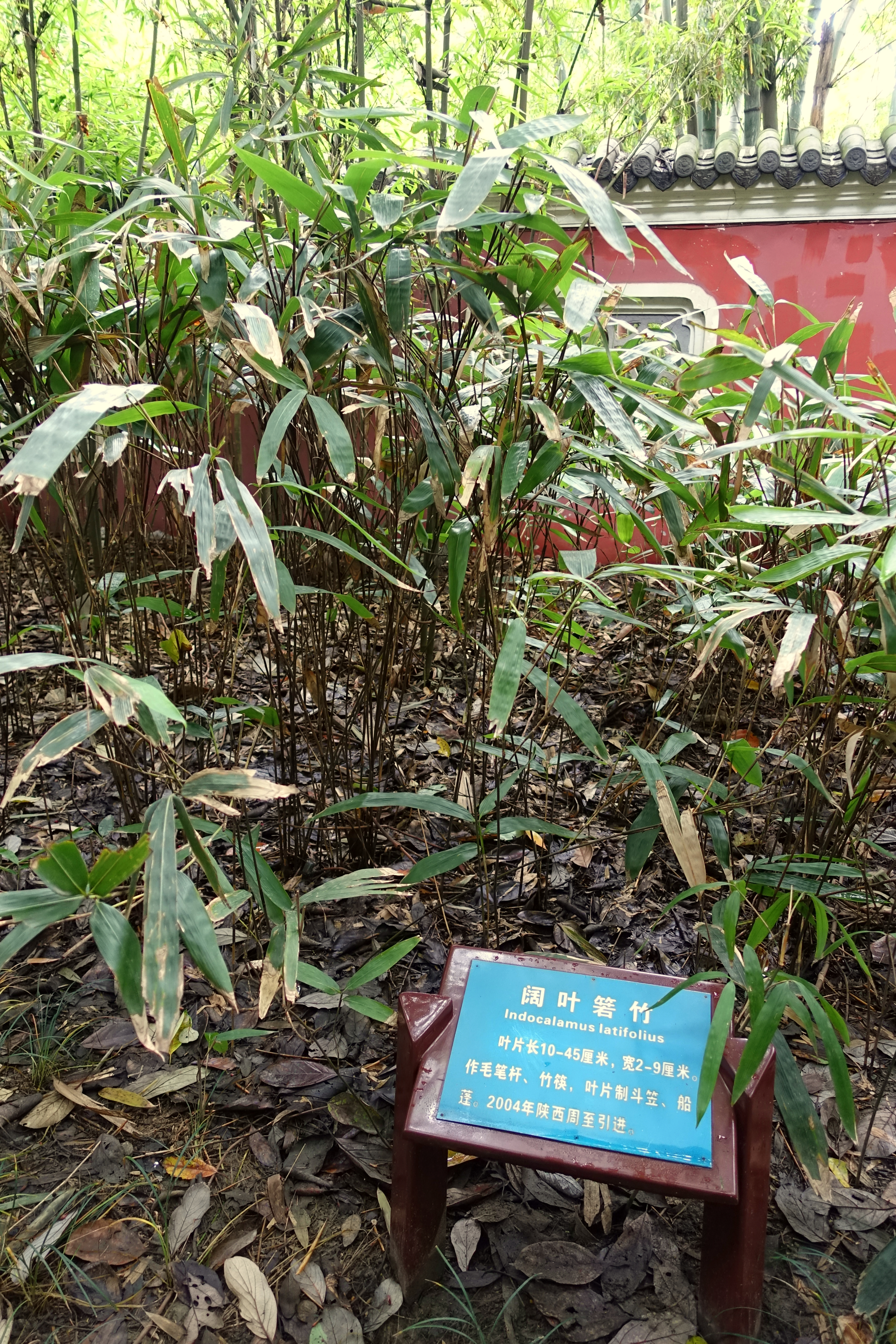

Scientific classification
- Kingdom: Plantae
- Clade: Tracheophytes
- Clade: Angiosperms
- Clade: Monocots
- Clade: Commelinids
- Order: Poales
- Family: Poaceae
- Genus: Indocalamus
- Species: I. latifolius

Binomial name
- Indocalamus latifolius (Keng) McClure

Synonyms
- Arundinaria latifolia Keng; Indocalamus lacunosus T.H.Wen; Indocalamus migoi (Nakai) Keng f.; Pseudosasa hirta S.L.Chen & G.Y.Sheng; Pseudosasa truncatula S.L.Chen & G.Y.Sheng; Sasamorpha latifolia (Keng) Nakai; Sasamorpha migoi Nakai

= Indocalamus latifolius =

Species of grass

Indocalamus latifolius is an East Asian species of bamboo in the genus Indocalamus. It is native to China. The species was first described in 1935, as Arundinaria latifolia, and transferred to Indocalamus in 1941.
