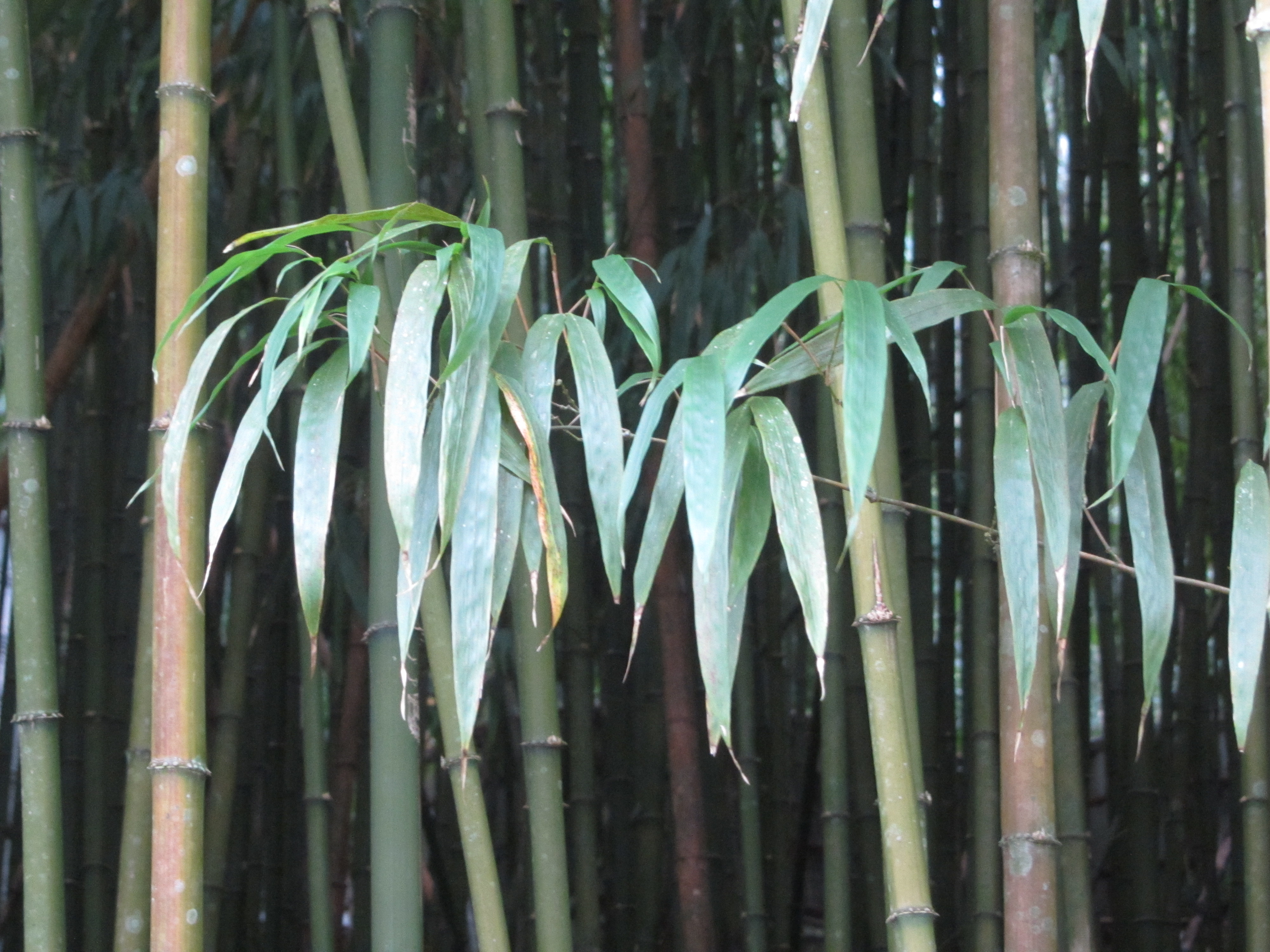

Scientific classification
- Kingdom: Plantae
- Clade: Embryophytes
- Clade: Tracheophytes
- Clade: Spermatophytes
- Clade: Angiosperms
- Clade: Monocots
- Clade: Commelinids
- Order: Poales
- Family: Poaceae
- Genus: Chimonobambusa
- Species: C. quadrangularis

Binomial name
- Chimonobambusa quadrangularis (Franceschi) Makino

Synonyms
- List: Arundinaria quadrangularis (Franceschi) Makino; Bambusa quadrangularis Franceschi; Phyllostachys quadrangularis (Franceschi) Rendle; Tetragonocalamus quadrangularis (Franceschi) Nakai; Bambos sikaktake Siebold; Bambusa sikaktake Zoll.; Chimonobambusa quadrangularis f. albostriata (Muroi & H.Okamura) T.H.Wen; Chimonobambusa quadrangularis f. aureostriata (Muroi & H.Okamura) T.H.Wen; Chimonobambusa quadrangularis f. cyrano-bergeraca T.H.Wen; Chimonobambusa quadrangularis f. nagaminea (H.Okamura) T.H.Wen; Chimonobambusa quadrangularis f. purpureiculma T.H.Wen; Chimonobambusa quadrangularis f. sotaroana (Muroi) T.H.Wen; Chimonobambusa quadrangularis f. suow T.H.Wen; Tetragonocalamus quadrangularis f. albostriatus Muroi & H.Okamura; Tetragonocalamus quadrangularis f. aureostriatus Muroi & H.Okamura; Tetragonocalamus quadrangularis f. castillonis Rifat ex Hirsch; Tetragonocalamus quadrangularis f. gimmei Kasahara & H.Okamura; Tetragonocalamus quadrangularis f. nagamineus H.Okamura; Tetragonocalamus quadrangularis var. sotaroanus Muroi; Tetragonocalamus quadrangularis f. sotaroanus (Muroi) Muroi; Tetragonocalamus quadrangularis f. suow Kasahara & H.Okamura; Tetragonocalamus quadrangularis f. tatejima Kasahara & H.Okamura; Thamnocalamus quadrangularis Recht. & Wetter

= Chimonobambusa quadrangularis =

Species of grass

Chimonobambusa quadrangularis, commonly called square bamboo or shidakudake, is a bamboo in the family Poaceae, native to mainland China and Taiwan, and naturalized to Japan. It is one of the very few monocots to have square stems. These stems, or culms are up to 9 m (30 ft) in height and 5 cm (2 in) thick.
