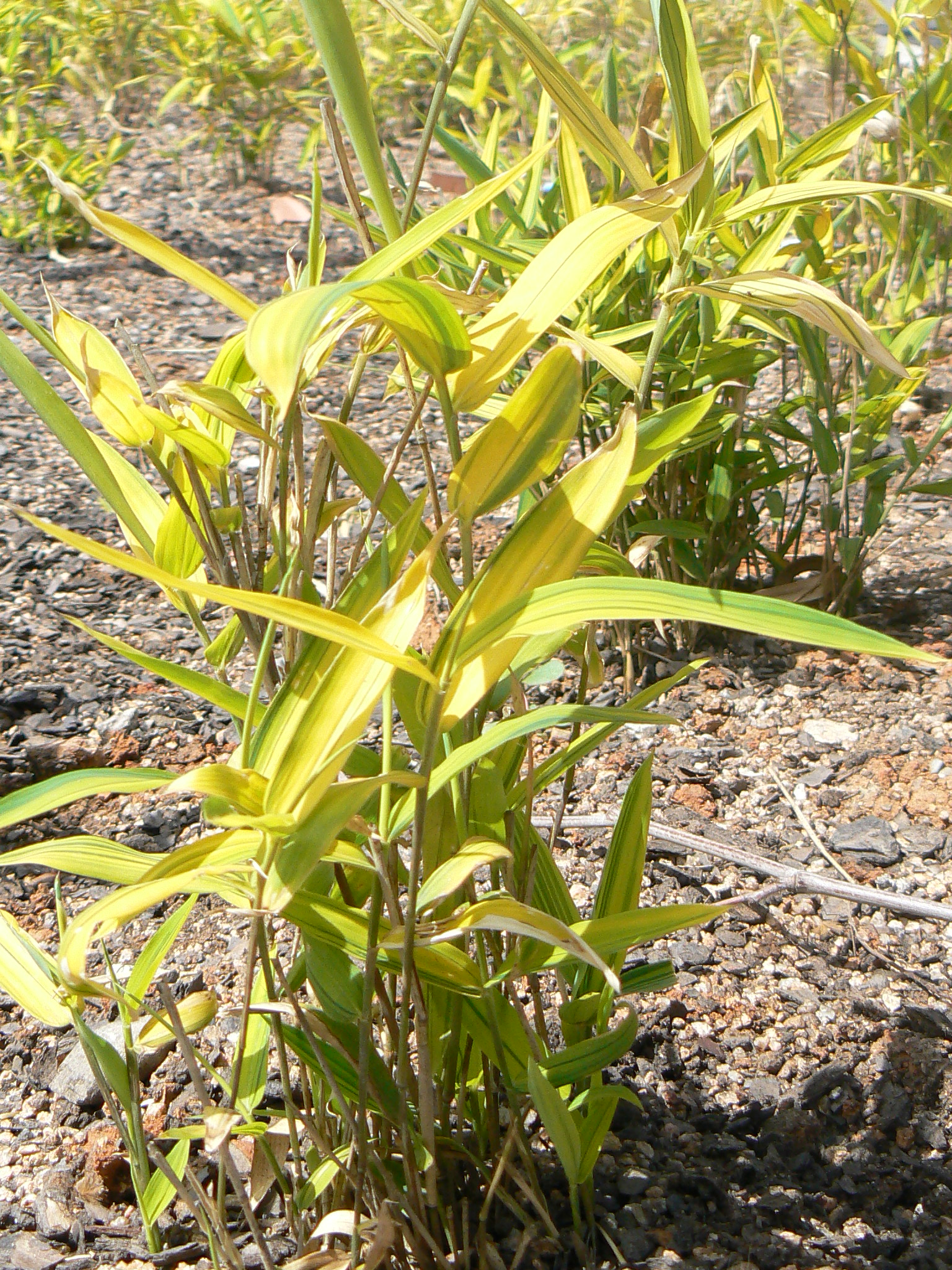

Scientific classification
- Kingdom: Plantae
- Clade: Tracheophytes
- Clade: Angiosperms
- Clade: Monocots
- Clade: Commelinids
- Order: Poales
- Family: Poaceae
- Genus: Pleioblastus
- Species: P. viridistriatus

Binomial name
- Pleioblastus viridistriatus (Regel) Makino

= Pleioblastus viridistriatus =

Species of grass

Pleioblastus viridistriatus, kamuro-zasa, is a species of bamboo in the grass family Poaceae, native to Japan. Growing to 2.5 m (8.2 ft), it is a compact bamboo with striking green and yellow striped leaves 25 cm (9.8 in) long, and darker vertical stems.

It is classified as a running bamboo, with underground rhizomes that spread rapidly in multiple directions, forming thickets. In a garden situation it can be invasive. However, its ornamental qualities make it a desirable subject for gardens, and it has received the Royal Horticultural Society's Award of Garden Merit.

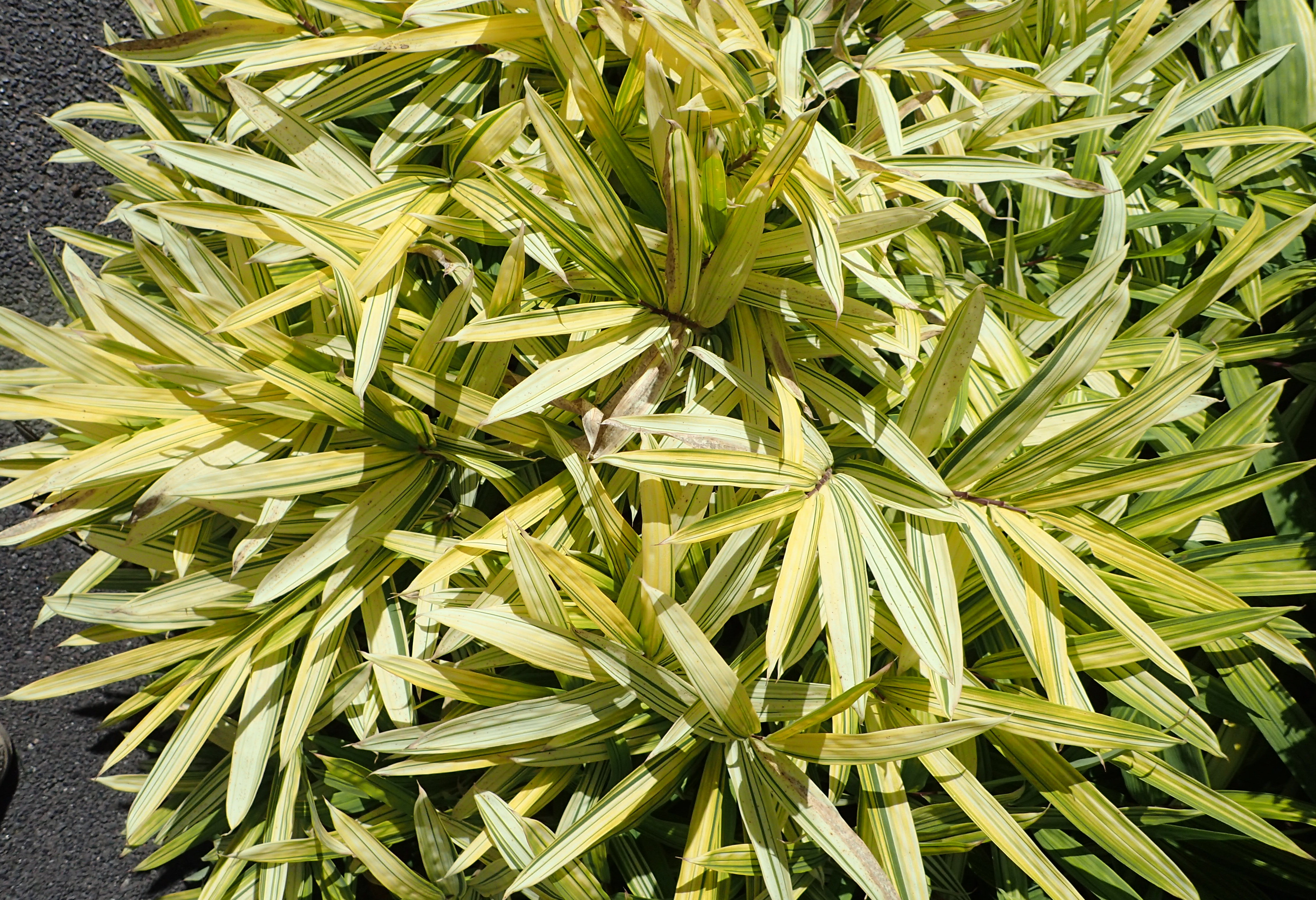

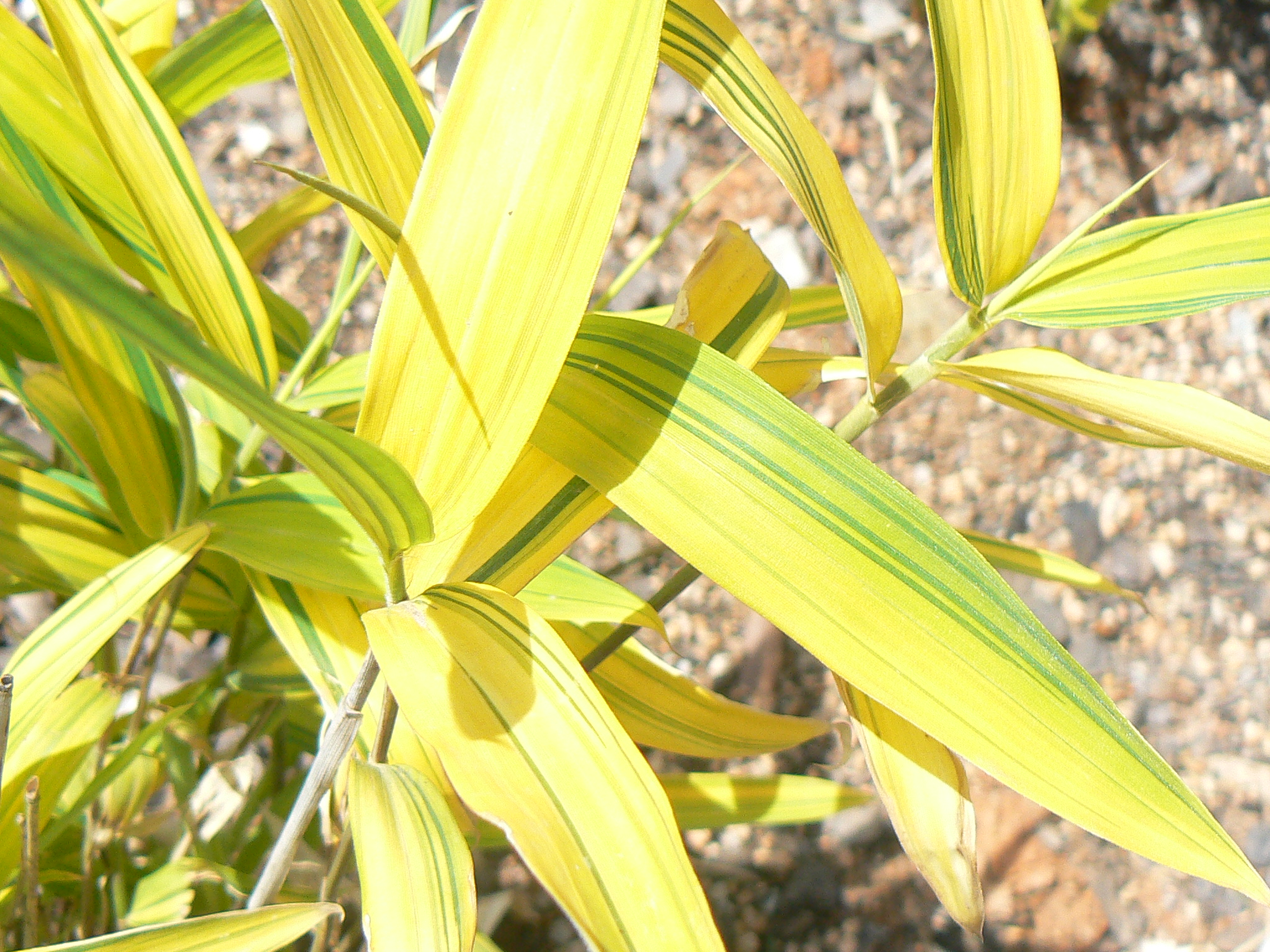
