= Tongpeia =

Scientific classification
- Kingdom: Plantae
- Clade: Tracheophytes
- Clade: Angiosperms
- Clade: Monocots
- Clade: Commelinids
- Order: Poales
- Family: Poaceae
- Subfamily: Bambusoideae
- Tribe: Arundinarieae
- Subtribe: Arundinariinae
- Genus: Tongpeia; Stapleton

Genus of bamboo

Tongpeia is a genus of bamboo. It includes three species native to south-central China.

- Tongpeia arachnoides Stapleton
- Tongpeia fungosa (T.P.Yi) Stapleton
- Tongpeia syrinx Stapleton
