= Gelidocalamus =

Scientific classification
- Kingdom: Plantae
- Clade: Tracheophytes
- Clade: Angiosperms
- Clade: Monocots
- Clade: Commelinids
- Order: Poales
- Family: Poaceae
- Subfamily: Bambusoideae
- Tribe: Arundinarieae
- Subtribe: Arundinariinae
- Genus: Gelidocalamus; T.H.Wen

Genus of grasses

Gelidocalamus is a genus of small to medium-sized bamboos in the grass family, native primarily to the mountains of eastern China, although one species (G. kunishii) is native to Taiwan and to the Nansei-shoto (Ryukyu Islands) region in Japan.

Species

1. Gelidocalamus albopubescens W.T.Lin & Z.J.Feng
2. Gelidocalamus annulatus T.H.Wen
3. Gelidocalamus fangianus (A.Camus) Keng f. & Wen
4. Gelidocalamus kunishii (Hayata) Keng f. & Wen
5. Gelidocalamus latifolius Q. H. Dai & T. Chen
6. Gelidocalamus longiinternodus T.H.Wen & S.C.Chen
7. Gelidocalamus multifolius B.M.Yang
8. Gelidocalamus rutilans T.H.Wen
9. Gelidocalamus solidus C.D.Chu & C.S.Chao
10. Gelidocalamus stellatus T.H.Wen
11. Gelidocalamus subsolidus W.T.Lin & Z.J.Feng
12. Gelidocalamus tessellatus T.H.Wen & C.C.Chang
13. Gelidocalamus velutinus W.T.Lin

Formerly included

see Sarocalamus

- Gelidocalamus fangianus – Sarocalamus faberi
