= Sarocalamus =

Scientific classification
- Kingdom: Plantae
- Clade: Tracheophytes
- Clade: Angiosperms
- Clade: Monocots
- Clade: Commelinids
- Order: Poales
- Family: Poaceae
- Subfamily: Bambusoideae
- Tribe: Arundinarieae
- Subtribe: Arundinariinae
- Genus: Sarocalamus; Stapleton

Type species
- Sarocalamus racemosus (Munro) Stapleton

Genus of grasses

Sarocalamus is a genus of Asian bamboo in the grass family.

Species

1. Sarocalamus faberi (Rendle) Stapleton – Sichuan, Yunnan, Guizhou
2. Sarocalamus racemosus (Munro) Stapleton – Tibet, Assam, Arunachal Pradesh, Myanmar, Bhutan, Sikkim, Nepal
3. Sarocalamus spanostachyus (T.P.Yi) Stapleton – Sichuan
