= Drepanostachyum falcatum =

Scientific classification
- Kingdom: Plantae
- Clade: Tracheophytes
- Clade: Angiosperms
- Clade: Monocots
- Clade: Commelinids
- Order: Poales
- Family: Poaceae
- Genus: Drepanostachyum
- Species: D. falcatum

Binomial name
- Drepanostachyum falcatum (Nees) Keng f.

Synonyms
- Synonymy: Arundinaria falcata Nees; Arundinaria falcata var. glomerata Gamble; Arundinaria gracilis (Rivière & C.Rivière) Blanch.; Arundinaria interrupta Trin.; Arundinaria utilis Cleghorn; Bambusa falcata (Nees) Rob.; Bambusa gracilis Rivière & C.Rivière; Chimonobambusa falcata (Nees) Nakai; Drepanostachyum falcatum var. glomeratum (Gamble) Pandey ex D.N.Tewari; Drepanostachyum falcatum var. sengteeanum Stapleton; Drepanostachyum gracile (Rivière & C.Rivière) S.Kumar; Fargesia falcata (Nees) T.P.Yi; Ludolfia falcata (Nees) Nees ex Munro; Phyllostachys falcata (Nees) D.L.Fu; Pleioblastus falcatus (Nees) T.Q.Nguyen; Sinarundinaria falcata (Nees) C.S.Chao & Renvoize; Thamnocalamus falcatus D.C.McClint., pro syn.; Thamnocalamus ringala Falc. ex Munro, pro syn.

Species of bamboo

Drepanostachyum falcatum is a species of bamboo from the Drepanostachyum genus that occur in the forested regions of the Himalayas and parts of Indochina in temperate and subtropical biomes.

== Description ==
It is a gregarious shrub with annual culms reaching between 2 to 3.5 metres high and 7 to 15 mm in diameter, culm sheaths are of straw color and are as long or longer than the internodes being up to 30 cm long and 7.5 cm wide at the base. Internode length is 15 to 30 cm long; leaf blades are 7.5 to 10 cm long and 5 to 8 mm wide. The caryopsis is linear and measures 12 mm long.

== Distribution ==
They occur from the Himalayas eastwards from the Western Himalayas through Pakistan, India, Nepal, the Eastern Himalayas and down to Indochina in Cambodia, Laos and Vietnam. They are found in shaded ravines under oaks, firs and mixed forests.
