= Ampelocalamus =

Scientific classification
- Kingdom: Plantae
- Clade: Tracheophytes
- Clade: Angiosperms
- Clade: Monocots
- Clade: Commelinids
- Order: Poales
- Family: Poaceae
- Subfamily: Bambusoideae
- Tribe: Arundinarieae
- Subtribe: Arundinariinae
- Genus: Ampelocalamus; S.L.Chen., T.H.Wen & G.Y.Sheng

Type species
- Ampelocalamus actinotrichus (Merr. & Chun) S.L.Chen., T.H.Wen & G.Y.Sheng

Synonyms
- Patellocalamus W.T.Lin

Genus of grasses

Ampelocalamus is a genus of Asian bamboo in the grass family. It is found mostly in Southern China, with some species in the eastern Himalayas and northern Indochina.

Species

1. Ampelocalamus actinotrichus
2. Ampelocalamus breviligulatus
3. Ampelocalamus calcareus
4. Ampelocalamus hirsutissimus
5. Ampelocalamus luodianensis
6. Ampelocalamus melicoideus
7. Ampelocalamus mianningensis
8. Ampelocalamus microphyllus
9. Ampelocalamus naibunensis
10. Ampelocalamus patellaris
11. Ampelocalamus saxatilis
12. Ampelocalamus scandens
13. Ampelocalamus yongshanensis
