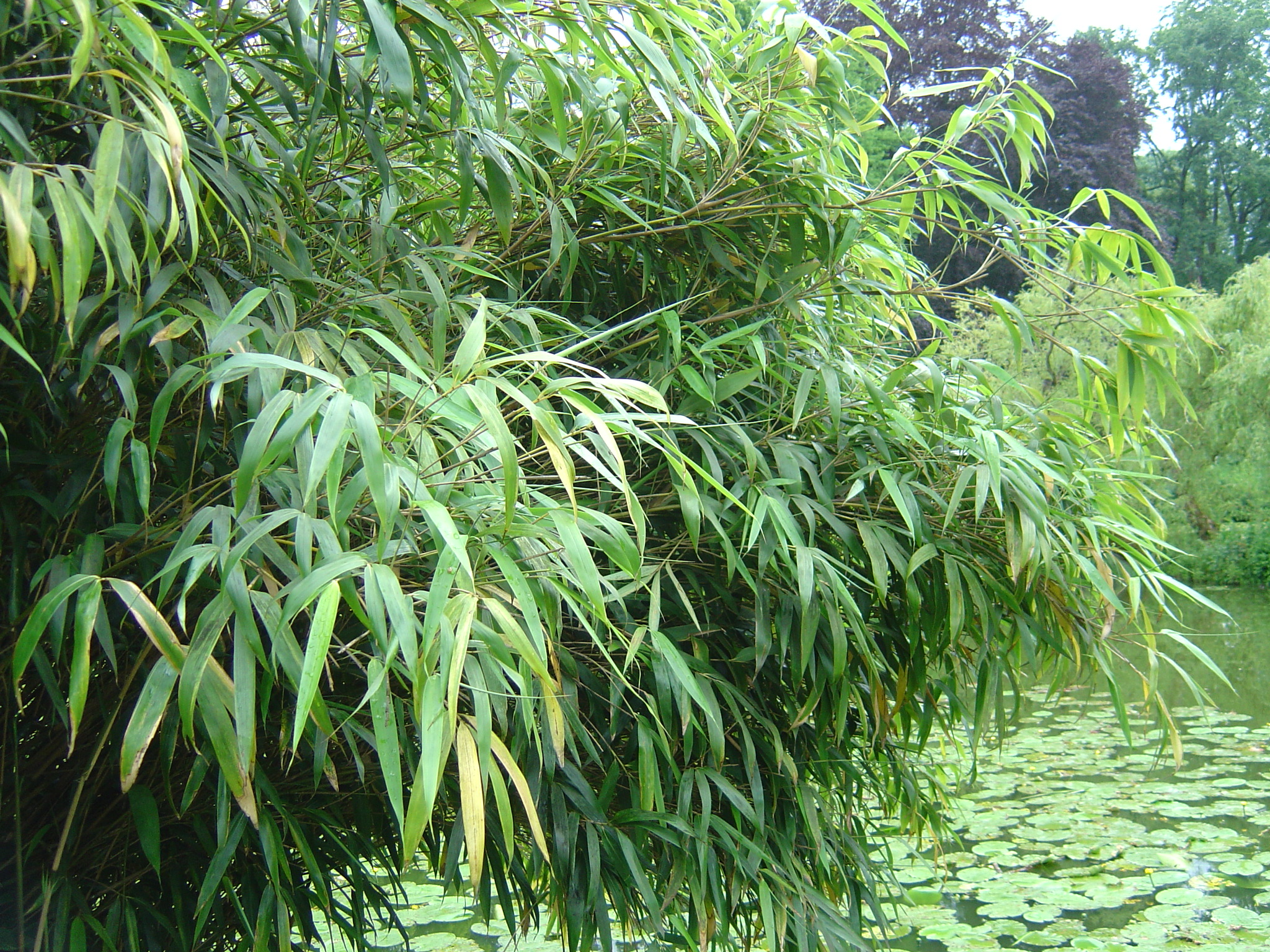
- At Münster Botanical Garden, Germany

Scientific classification
- Kingdom: Plantae
- Clade: Embryophytes
- Clade: Tracheophytes
- Clade: Spermatophytes
- Clade: Angiosperms
- Clade: Monocots
- Clade: Commelinids
- Order: Poales
- Family: Poaceae
- Subfamily: Bambusoideae
- Tribe: Arundinarieae
- Subtribe: Arundinariinae
- Genus: Fargesia; Franch.

Type species
- Fargesia spathacea Franch.

Synonyms
- Sinarundinaria Nakai

= Fargesia =

Genus of grasses

Fargesia is a genus of flowering plants in the grass family. These bamboos are native primarily to China, with a few species in Vietnam and in the eastern Himalayas. Some species are cultivated as ornamentals, with common names including umbrella bamboo and fountain bamboo.

They are medium to small mountain clumping bamboos, native to alpine conifer forests of East Asia, from China south to Vietnam and west to the eastern slopes of the Himalayas. They are known in Chinese as jian zhu (Chinese: 箭竹; pinyin: jiànzhú), meaning "arrow bamboo".

The scientific name was given in honour of the French missionary and amateur botanist Père Paul Guillaume Farges (1844–1912).

Fargesias are some of the world's hardiest bamboos, but they do not spread vigorously. Common bamboos in the genus Fargesia are essential foods for giant pandas, and large-scale flowering of its species has had a devastating effect on panda populations. Giant panda habitat will therefore need at least two species of Fargesia, to ensure food supply during flowering events.

== Taxonomy ==
The genus currently includes 49 accepted species. Many species previously included here were transferred to the genera Borinda, Thamnocalamus, and Yushania based on morphological and genetic analyses. As of May 2025, Plants of the World Online accepts the following species:

- Fargesia alatovaginata T.P.Yi & J.Y.Shi
- Fargesia apicirubens Stapleton
- Fargesia brevipes (McClure) T.P.Yi
- Fargesia brevissima T.P.Yi
- Fargesia caduca T.P.Yi
- Fargesia canaliculata T.P.Yi
- Fargesia circinata Hsueh & T.P.Yi
- Fargesia concinna T.P.Yi
- Fargesia conferta T.P.Yi
- Fargesia cuspidata (Keng) Z.P.Wang & G.H.Ye
- Fargesia daminiu T.P.Yi & J.Y.Shi
- Fargesia decurvata J.L.Lu
- Fargesia denudata T.P.Yi
- Fargesia dracocephala T.P.Yi
- Fargesia dulcicula T.P.Yi
- Fargesia exposita T.P.Yi
- Fargesia funiushanensis T.P.Yi
- Fargesia glabrifolia T.P.Yi
- Fargesia gongshanensis T.P.Yi
- Fargesia hackelii Ohrnb.
- Fargesia hainanensis T.P.Yi
- Fargesia jiulongensis T.P.Yi
- Fargesia lincangensis T.P.Yi
- Fargesia longiuscula (Hsueh f. & Y.Y.Dai) Ohrnb.
- Fargesia mali T.P.Yi
- Fargesia melanostachys (Hand.-Mazz.) T.P.Yi
- Fargesia microauriculata M.S.Sun, D.Z.Li & H.Q.Yang
- Fargesia murielae (Gamble) T.P.Yi
- Fargesia nitida (Mitford) Keng f. ex T.P.Yi
- Fargesia obliqua T.P.Yi
- Fargesia orbiculata T.P.Yi
- Fargesia pauciflora (Keng) T.P.Yi
- Fargesia plurisetosa T.H.Wen
- Fargesia porphyrea T.P.Yi
- Fargesia purpurea D.Z.Li & X.Y.Ye
- Fargesia qinlingensis T.P.Yi & J.X.Shao
- Fargesia robusta T.P.Yi
- Fargesia rufa T.P.Yi
- Fargesia sapaensis N.H.Xia & You Y.Zhang
- Fargesia scabrida T.P.Yi
- Fargesia semicoriacea T.P.Yi
- Fargesia spathacea Franch.
- Fargesia stenoclada T.P.Yi
- Fargesia tenuilignea T.P.Yi
- Fargesia ungulata T.H.Wen
- Fargesia vicina (Keng) T.P.Yi
- Fargesia weiningensis T.P.Yi & Lin Yang
- Fargesia wuliangshanensis T.P.Yi
- Fargesia yuanjiangensis Hsueh & T.P.Yi
- Fargesia yunnanensis Hsueh & T.P.Yi
