= Takenoshin Nakai =

Japanese botanist (1882–1952)

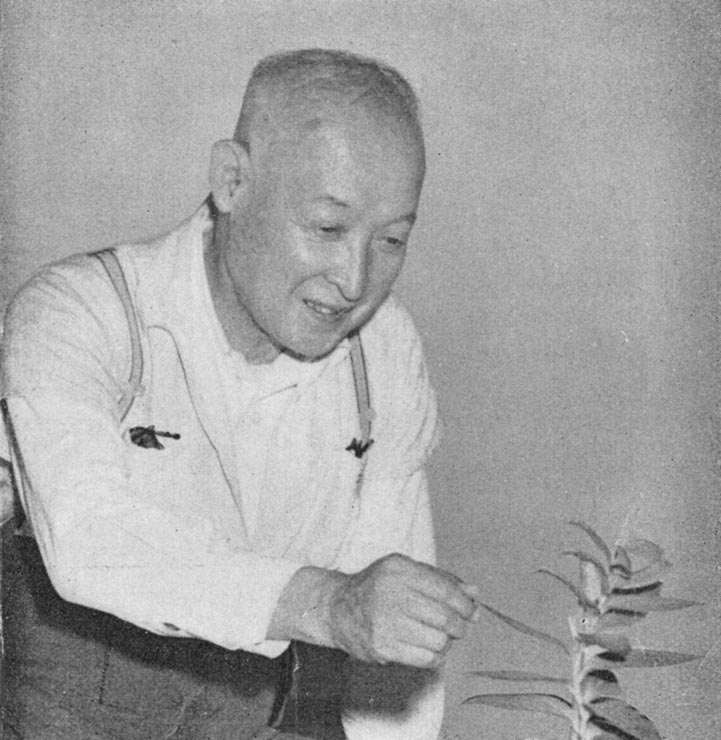
Takenoshin Nakai in Kagoshima, July 1952.

Takenoshin Nakai (中井 猛之進, Nakai Takenoshin; November 27, 1882, Gifu Prefecture – December 6, 1952) was a Japanese botanist. In 1919 and 1930, he published papers on the plants of Japan and Korea, including the genus Cephalotaxus. Between 1943 and 1945, during the Japanese occupation of the Dutch East Indies (now Indonesia), Takenoshin Nakai was the director of 's Lands Plantentuin in Batavia (now Bogor Botanical Gardens in Bogor).

== Taxonomist ==
The International Plant Names Index lists 4,733 records of plant names of which Nakai is an author or co-author.
