= Bambouseraie de Prafrance =

Botanical garden in France

Coordinates: 44°4′16″N 3°58′40″E

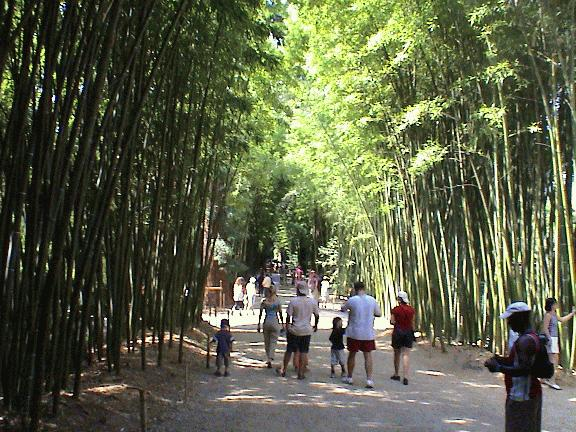
Bambouseraie de Prafrance

The Bambouseraie de Prafrance (34 hectares, 84 acres) is a private botanical garden specializing in bamboos, located in Générargues, near Anduze, Gard, Languedoc-Roussillon, France. It is open daily in the warmer months; an admission fee is charged.

The garden contains one of Europe's oldest bamboo collections, established in 1856 by amateur botanist Eugène Mazel (1828-1890), who had made his fortune in the spice trade, and who continued to build the collection until he encountered financial problems in 1890. Although the garden subsequently changed ownership several times, it has continued to be a showcase for bamboos, and today contains around 300 bamboo species and cultivars, as well as other plantings of Asiatic shrubs and trees, Ginkgo biloba, sequoia, Trachycarpus fortunei, a replica of a Laotian village, and some 5 km of water canals.

== Bamboo collections ==
- Miniature bamboos (10–15 cm.) - Pleioblastus distichus, Pleioblastus fortunei, Pleioblastus pumilus, Pleioblastus pygmaeus, Pleioblastus viridistriatus, Pleioblastus viridistriatus "Chrysophyllus", Pleioblastus viridistriatuss "Vagans", Sasa admirabilis, Sasa masamuneana "Albostriata", Sasa masamuneana "Aureostriata", and Shibataea Kumasaca.
- Small bamboos (1–3 meters) - Bambusa multiplex "Elegans", Chimonobambusa marmorea, Chimonobambusa marmorea "Variegata", Fargesia murielae, Fargesia murielae "Harewood", Fargesia murielae "Jumbo", F. murielae "Simba", Fargesia nitida, Fargesia robusta, Hibanobambusa tranquillans "Shiroshima", Pleioblastus chino "Elegantissimus", Pleioblastus shibuyanus "Tsuboï", Sasa latifolia, Sasa palmata "Nebulosa", Sasa tessellata, Sasa tsuboiana, Sasa veitchii, and Sinobambusa rubroligula.
- Medium bamboos (3–8 meters) - Arundinaria kunishii, Arundinaria anceps, Bambusa multiplex, Bambusa multiplex "Alphonse Karr", Bambusa multiplex "Golden goddess", Bambusa ventricosa, Bambusa ventricosa "Kimmei", Chimonobambusa quadrangularis, Chimonobambusa quadrangularis "Tatejima", Chimonobambusa tumidissinoda, Chusquea coronalis, Hibanobambusa tranquillans, Himalayacalamus asper, Otatea acuminata, Phyllostachys arcana "Luteosulcata", Phyllostachys aurea, Phyllostachys aurea "Flavescens inversa", Phyllostachys aurea "Holochrysa", Phyllostachys aurea "Koi", Phyllostachys aureosulcata, Phyllostachys aureosulcata "Aureocaulis", Phyllostachys aureosulcata "Spectabilis", Phyllostachys bambusoides "Marliacea", Phyllostachys bambusoides "Subvariegata", Phyllostachys bissetii, Phyllostachys dulcis, Phyllostachys flexuosa, Phyllostachys glauca, Phyllostachys heteroclada, Phyllostachys humilis, Phyllostachys manii, Phyllostachys meyeri, Phyllostachys nidularia, Phyllostachys nigra, Phyllostachys nuda, Phyllostachys nuda "Localis", Phyllostachys pubescens "Heterocycla", Phyllostachys praecox, Phyllostachys praecox "Viridisulcata", Phyllostachys proprinqua, Phyllostachys rubromarginata, Pleioblastus gramineus, Pleioblastus hindsii, Pleioblastus linearis, Pseudosasa amabilis, Pseudosasa japonica, Pseudosasa japonica "Variegata", Pseudosasa japonica "Tsutsumiana", Semiarundinaria fastuosa, Semiarundinaria makinoi, Semiarundinaria okuboi, Semiarundinaria yashadake "Kimmei", Sinobambusa tootsik, Sinobambusa tootsik "Albovariegata", and Thamnocalamus tessellatus.
- Giant bamboos (8–28 meters) - Bambusa arundinacea, Bambusa oldhamii, Bambusa textilis, Bambusa vulgaris "Striata", Phyllostachys bambusoides, Phyllostachys bambusoides "Castillonis", Phyllostachys bambusoides "Castilloni inversa", Phyllostachys bambusoides "Holocrysa", Phyllostachys bambusoides "Tanakae", Phyllostachys edulis "Moso",Phyllostachys makinoi, Phyllostachys nigra "Boryana", Phyllostachys nigra "Henonis", Phyllostachys pubescens, Phyllostachys pubescens "Bicolor", Phyllostachys viridis "Mitis", Phyllostachys viridis "Sulfurea", Phyllostachys vivax, Phyllostachys vivax "Aureocaulis", Phyllostachys vivax "Huanvenzhu", Phyllostachys violascens, and Phyllostachys viridiglaucescens.

== See also ==
- List of botanical gardens in France
