= Phyllostachys virella =

Scientific classification
- Kingdom: Plantae
- Clade: Tracheophytes
- Clade: Angiosperms
- Clade: Monocots
- Clade: Commelinids
- Order: Poales
- Family: Poaceae
- Genus: Phyllostachys
- Species: P. virella

Binomial name
- Phyllostachys virella T.H.Wen

Species of grass

Phyllostachys virella
- Traditional Chinese: 東陽青皮竹
- Simplified Chinese: 东阳青皮竹
Transcriptions
Standard Mandarin
- Hanyu Pinyin: Dōng yáng qīng pí zhú

Phyllostachys virella is a hardy running bamboo with culms that grow thick relative to its height with a subtle scent suggestive of sandalwood.

== Description ==
This bamboo grows with an expected height to 9 m (30 ft) with a culm diameter to 5 cm (2 in). New culms are green, paling with age, with all green internodes that later develop white powdery rings at maturity. Culm sheath colors appear grey-green with burgundy or purple margins with larger sheaths sparsely strewn with small spots. Similar to Phyllostachys atrovaginata, rubbing the culms of this bamboo may release an aroma reminiscent of sandalwood.

== Distribution ==
This bamboo grows in areas ranging from subtropical to temperate and tolerates winter low temperatures better than most bamboos. Its natural distribution in China is found in Zhejiang Province.

== Name ==
Its common name of "green skin bamboo" or "Dongyang green skin bamboo" translates directly from the Chinese name, Dongyang being a city-level county in the central area of Zhejiang Province.
