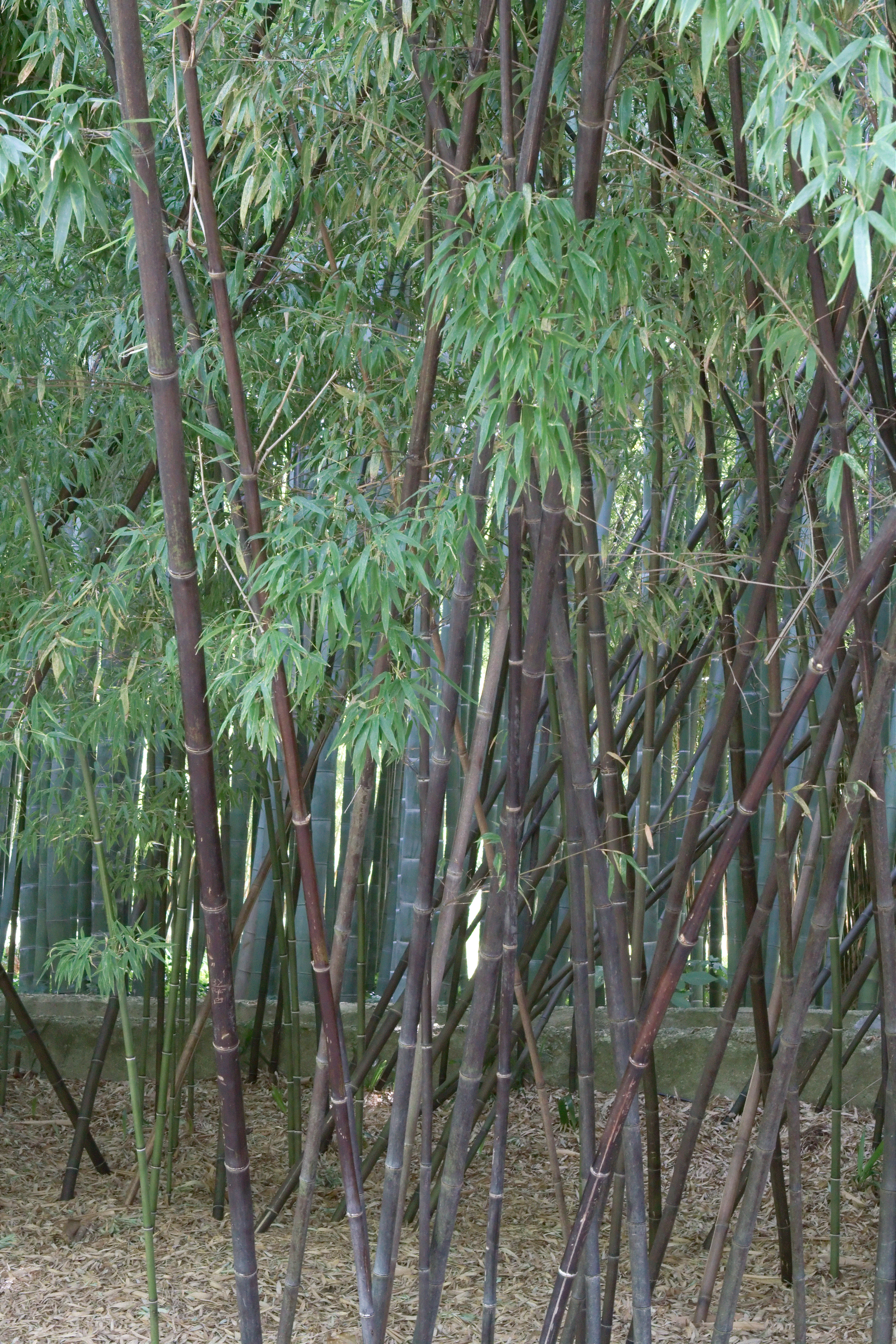
- Black bamboo in Bambouseraie de Prafrance at Générargues, Gard, Languedoc-Roussillon, France

Scientific classification
- Kingdom: Plantae
- Clade: Embryophytes
- Clade: Tracheophytes
- Clade: Spermatophytes
- Clade: Angiosperms
- Clade: Monocots
- Clade: Commelinids
- Order: Poales
- Family: Poaceae
- Genus: Phyllostachys
- Species: P. nigra

Binomial name
- Phyllostachys nigra (Lodd. ex Lindl.) Munro

Synonyms
- Arundinaria stolonifera Kurz; Bambos kurotake Siebold nom. inval.; Bambusa boryana Bean nom. inval.; Bambusa dichotoma Donn nom. inval.; Bambusa nigra Lodd. ex Lindl.; Bambusa nigricans Steud. nom. inval.; Bambusa nigropunctata Bean nom. inval.; Phyllostachys boryana Mitford; Phyllostachys filifera McClure; Phyllostachys fulva Mitford; Phyllostachys nana Rendle; Phyllostachys nigripes Hayata; Phyllostachys nigropunctata Mitford; Phyllostachys punctata (Bean) A.H.Lawson; Phyllostachys stolonifera Kurz ex Munro nom. inval.; Sinarundinaria nigra A.H.Lawson nom. inval.; Sinoarundinaria nigra (Lodd. ex Lindl.) Ohwi ex Mayeb.

= Phyllostachys nigra =

Species of grass

Phyllostachys nigra, commonly known as black bamboo or purple bamboo (Chinese: 紫竹), is a species of bamboo, native to Hunan Province of China, and is widely cultivated elsewhere.

Growing up to 10 meters (35 ft) tall by 5cm (2 in) wide, it forms clumps of slender arching canes which turn black after two or three seasons. The abundant lance-shaped leaves are 4–13 cm (2–5 in) long.

Numerous forms and cultivars are available for garden use. The species and the form P. nigra f. henonis have both gained the Royal Horticultural Society's Award of Garden Merit. The form henonis is also known as Henon bamboo and as cultivar 'Henon'.

== Life cycle ==
Like many species of bamboo, black bamboo synchronizes its flowering, with flowering events happening every 40-120 years. According to one source, it has bloomed every 120 years "since records have been kept". It is monocarpic, that is, after flowering, the plants die.

Henon bamboo flowers every 120 years and is predicted to flower in the 2020s. Since it is widely distributed in Japan, dieback of its stands may cause serious social and environmental problems. Moreover, Henon bamboo rarely sets fertile seeds, so it is not clear how this species has survived over long periods in Japan.

== Uses ==
It is used for lumber (timber), food, and musical instruments, among other things, in areas of China where it is native and also worldwide.

== Phytochemistry ==
A 2008 study from Zhejiang University, in China, isolated several flavone C-glycosides on black bamboo leaves, including orientin, homoorientin, vitexin and isovitexin.
