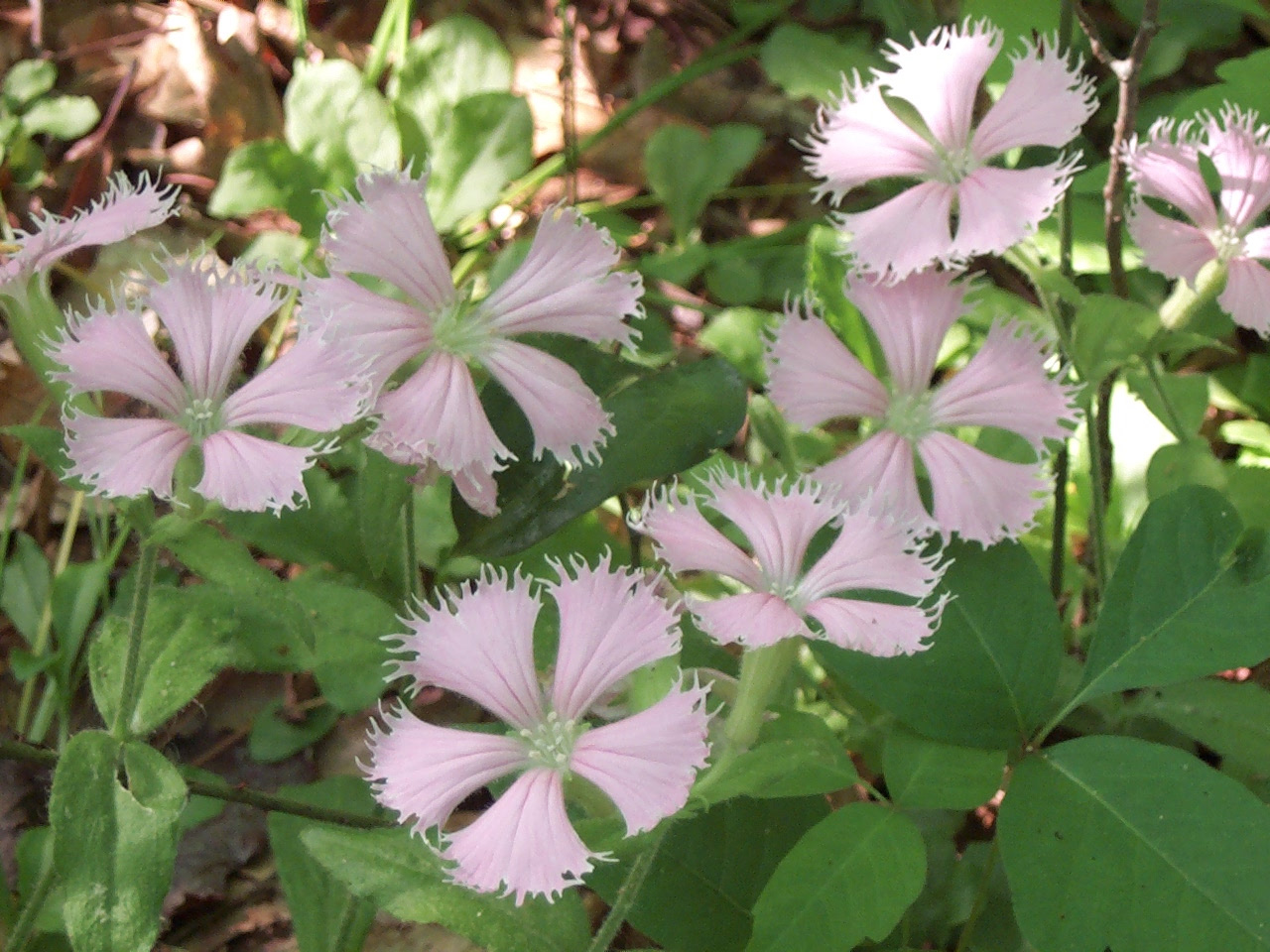

Conservation status
- Imperiled (NatureServe)

- Endangered (ESA)

Scientific classification
- Kingdom: Plantae
- Clade: Tracheophytes
- Clade: Angiosperms
- Clade: Eudicots
- Order: Caryophyllales
- Family: Caryophyllaceae
- Genus: Silene
- Species: S. polypetala

Binomial name
- Silene polypetala (Walter) Fernald & B.G.Schub.

Synonyms
- Silene catesbaei Walter; Silene baldwinii Nutt.; Silene fimbriata Baldwin ex Elliott; Melandrium baldwinii (Nutt.) Rohrb.; Cucubalus polypetalus Walter

= Silene polypetala =

Species of flowering plant

Silene polypetala (syn. Silene catesbaei) is a rare species of flowering plant in the family Caryophyllaceae known by the common names eastern fringed catchfly and fringed campion. It is native to Georgia and northern Florida in the United States. It is threatened by the loss and degradation of suitable habitat. It is a federally listed endangered species of the United States.

This plant is a rhizomatous perennial herb growing from a thick taproot topped with a woody, branching caudex. There are several stems and shoots measuring up to 40 centimeters in length. The lance-shaped leaves are each up to 9 centimeters long by 25 wide and grow in pairs along the stem. The inflorescence usually has three flowers. Each flower has five pink or white fan-shaped petals with fringed tips, each measuring 1.5 to 2.5 centimeters long. The base of the flower is encased in a papery 10-veined calyx of sepals. The plant can reproduce vegetatively by resprouting from its rhizome, so what appears to be several plants may be one plant with genetically identical clones.

This plant grows in soils of sandy, calcareous loam, often in moist habitat in forests and woods. One population resides in hardwood forests of the Georgia Piedmont region, while a geographically disjunct population predominantly found in wooded ravines occurs at the Georgia–Florida border.

The main threat to the species is the loss of its habitat. In Georgia, some populations have been endangered by logging and excavation activities, resulting in habitat fragmentation. The introduced species Common ivy (Hedera helix) has invaded one population. Other invasive plant species in the area include Japanese honeysuckle (Lonicera japonica), Chinese privet (Ligustrum sinense), spiceberry (Ardisia crenata), heavenly bamboo (Nandina domestica), and golden bamboo (Phyllostachys aurea). Though some populations have been destroyed, some new ones have been discovered in the meantime.
