= Botanical Garden of the University of Vienna =

Botanical garden in Vienna, Austria

Coordinates: 48°11′30″N 16°23′02″E

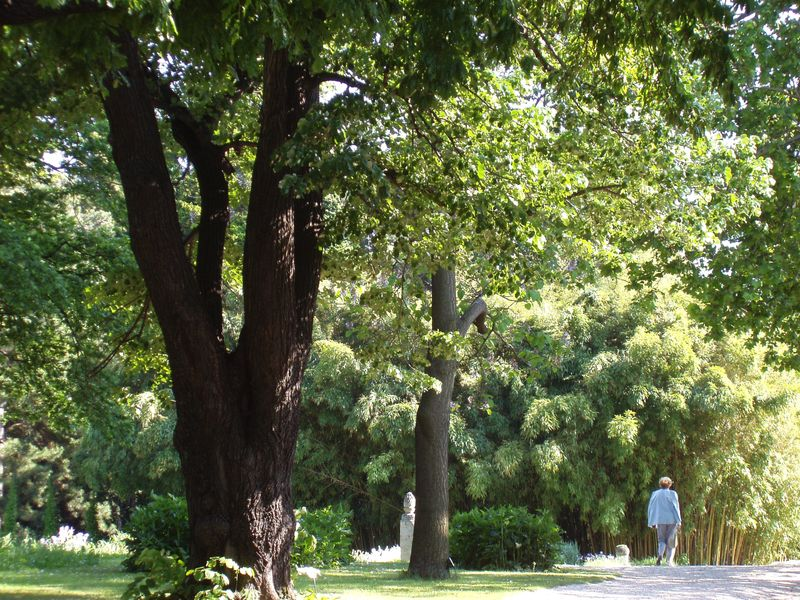
The Botanical Garden of the University of Vienna

The Botanical Garden of the University of Vienna is a botanical garden in Vienna, Austria. It covers 8 hectares and is immediately adjacent to the Belvedere gardens. It is a part of the University of Vienna.

== History ==
The gardens date back to 1754 when Empress Maria Theresa founded the Hortus Botanicus Vindobonensis with renowned botanist Nikolaus von Jacquin as one of its first directors. His son, Joseph von Jacquin, succeeded him as director, as did a number of other leading botanists in turn, including Stefan Endlicher, Eduard Fenzl, Anton Kerner von Marilaun, Richard von Wettstein, Fritz Knoll, Karl von Frisch, and Lothar Geitler. The Institute of Botany building was opened in 1905. However, at the end of the Second World War, the institute, all the greenhouses, and the entire garden area were bombed and severely damaged, and thus required major repair work.

In 1994, Wollemia (Wollemia nobilis) was discovered in Australia, previously known only from fossils. On the occasion of the 250th anniversary of the Botanical Garden of the University of Vienna in 2004, the garden received a Wollemia as a gift from Australia, this was the first Wollemia to be shown on the European mainland. This plant is now on permanent loan to the Schönbrunn Palm House. In the garden, the non-hardy plant is part of the cold house group. On May 29, 2022, 2:30 p.m., the titanwort has reached "full bloom". The top heats up in the process and emits an unpleasant odor. The opening hours of the two following days are extended to 11 p.m.

== Flora ==
The gardens currently contain more than 11,500 species of plants, including well-documented tropical plants, particularly of such families as Annonaceae, Rubiaceae, Gesneriaceae, Bromeliaceae or Orchidaceae. Its greenhouses (c. 1,500 m^{2}) were originally built between 1890 and 1893, but were damaged during the Second World War; they were renovated or rebuilt between 1970 and 1995. Only the tropical greenhouse in the centre of the complex is open for the public.

There are several old trees in the Botanical Garden, but one of the oldest is now no longer on the garden grounds. The Jacquin or Mozart plane tree (Platanus orientalis) is a Viennese natural monument and grows in front of the Department of Botany and Biodiversity Research. Due to property shifts, it now stands on the sidewalk in front of the department.

The garden collections include:

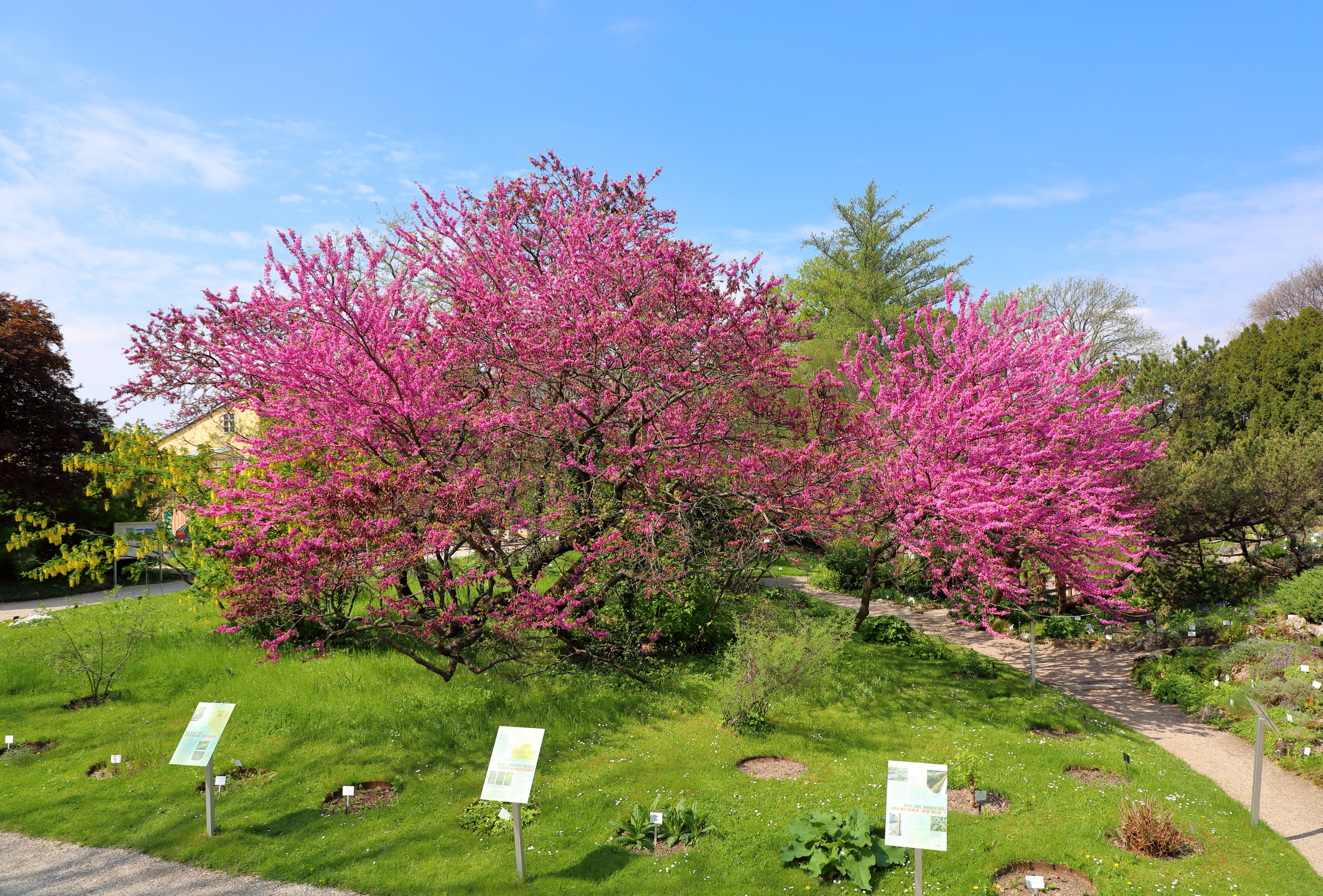
Blooming Judas trees (Cercis siliquastrum) next to the main entrance

- Abies pinsapo
- Aesculus pavia
- Asimina triloba
- Cephalotaxus harringtonii
- Diospyros lotus
- Elaeagnus angustifolia
- Ephedra
- Ficus carica
- Ginkgo biloba
- Gunnera chilensis
- +Laburnocytisus adamii
- Liriodendron tulipifera
- Magnolia
- Metasequoia glyptostroboides

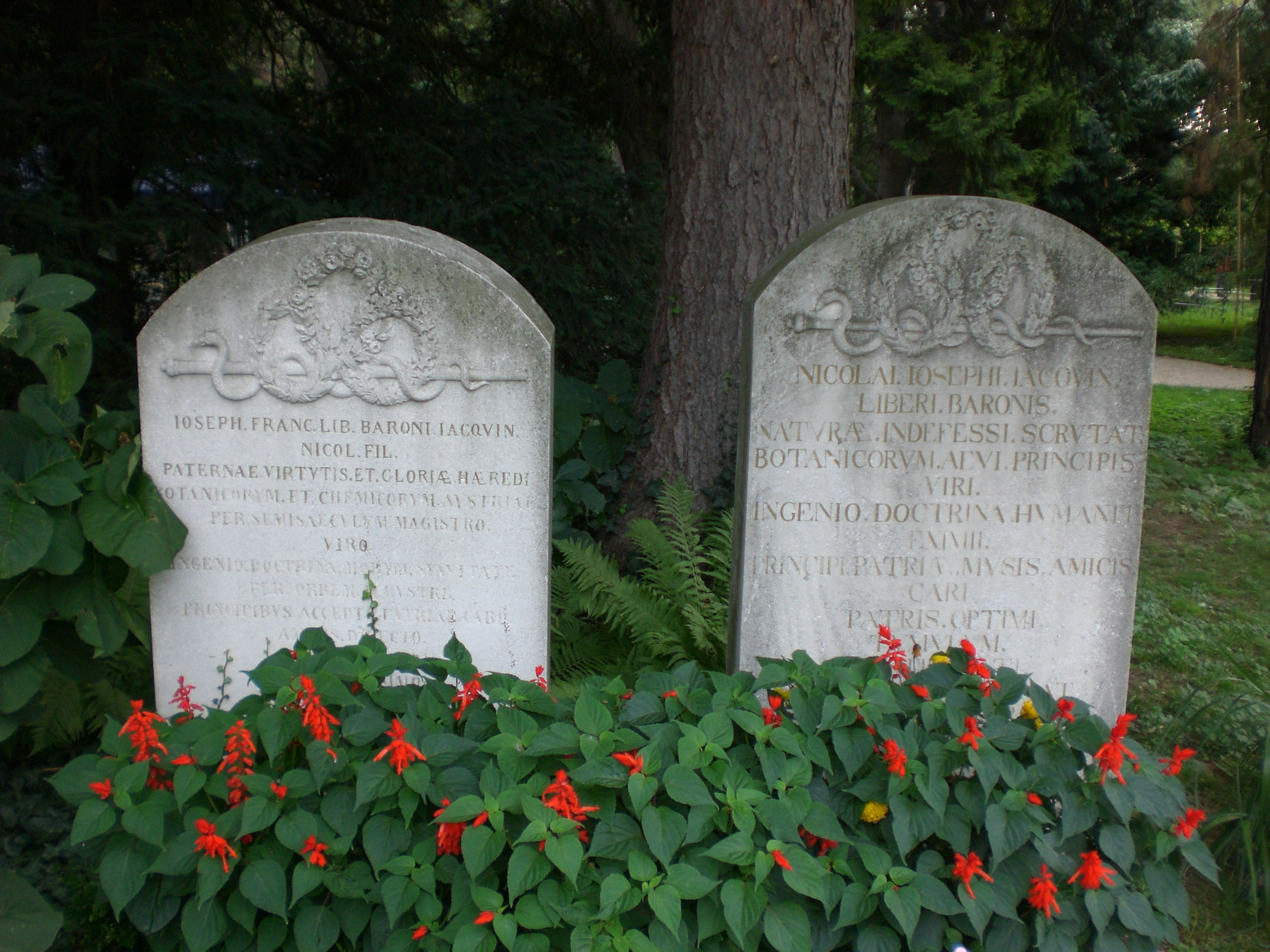
Tombstones of Nikolaus Joseph von Jacquin and Joseph Franz von Jacquin in the garden; old position

- Nothofagus antarctica
- Ostrya carpinifolia
- Paeonia
- Parrotia persica
- Paulownia tomentosa
- Phyllostachys viridiglaucescens
- Pinus aristata
- Platanus orientalis
- Poncirus trifoliata
- Prunus tenella
- Rhododendron
- Salvia
- Sequoiadendron giganteum
- Syringa
- Viburnum
- Vitis riparia
