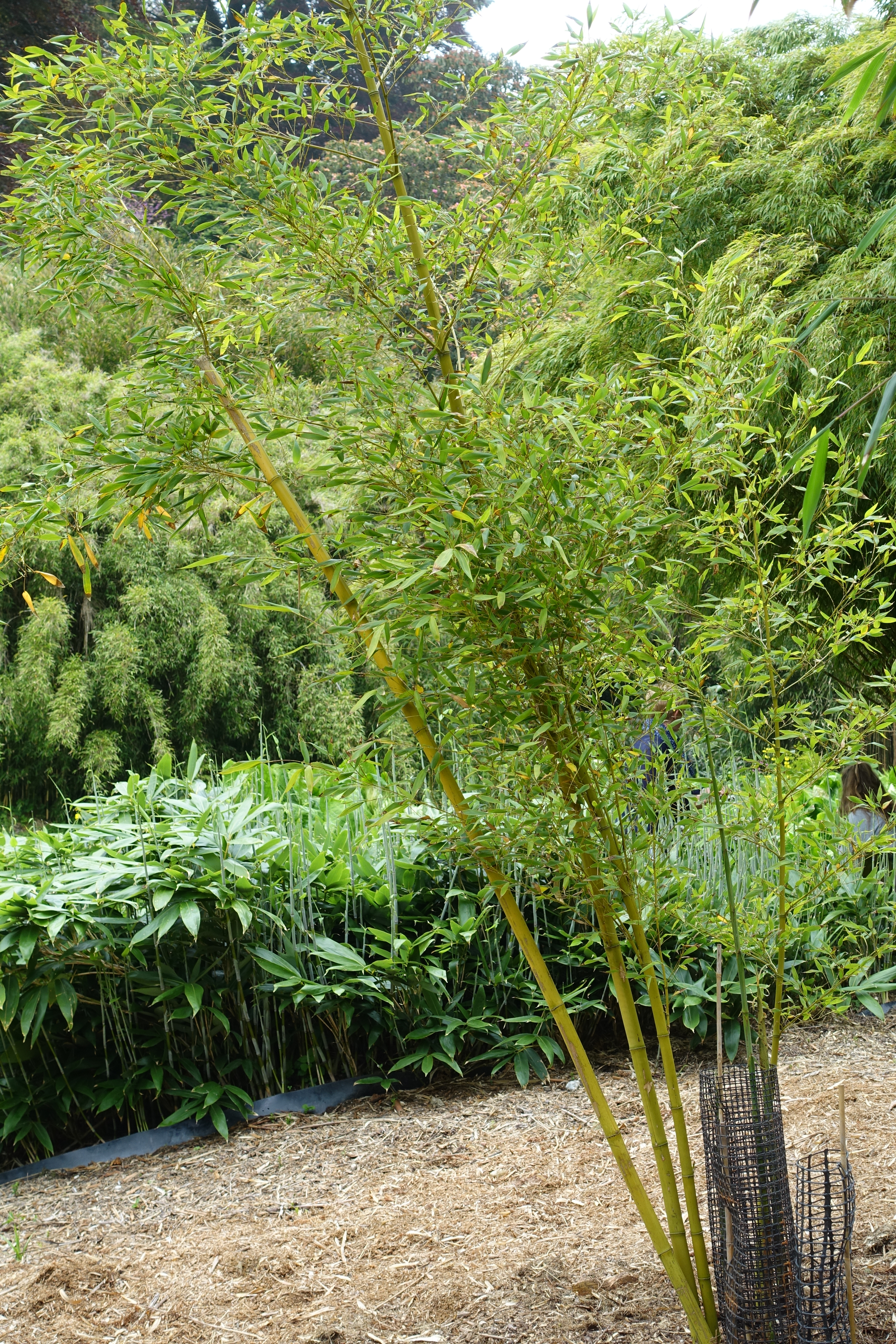

Scientific classification
- Kingdom: Plantae
- Clade: Tracheophytes
- Clade: Angiosperms
- Clade: Monocots
- Clade: Commelinids
- Order: Poales
- Family: Poaceae
- Genus: Phyllostachys
- Species: P. sulphurea

Binomial name
- Phyllostachys sulphurea (Carrière) Rivière & C.Rivière 1878

= Phyllostachys sulphurea =

Species of grass

Phyllostachys sulphurea is a species of bamboo found in Anhui, Fujian, Henan, Hunan, Jiangsu, Jiangxi, Shaanxi, Shandong, Zhejiang provinces of China
