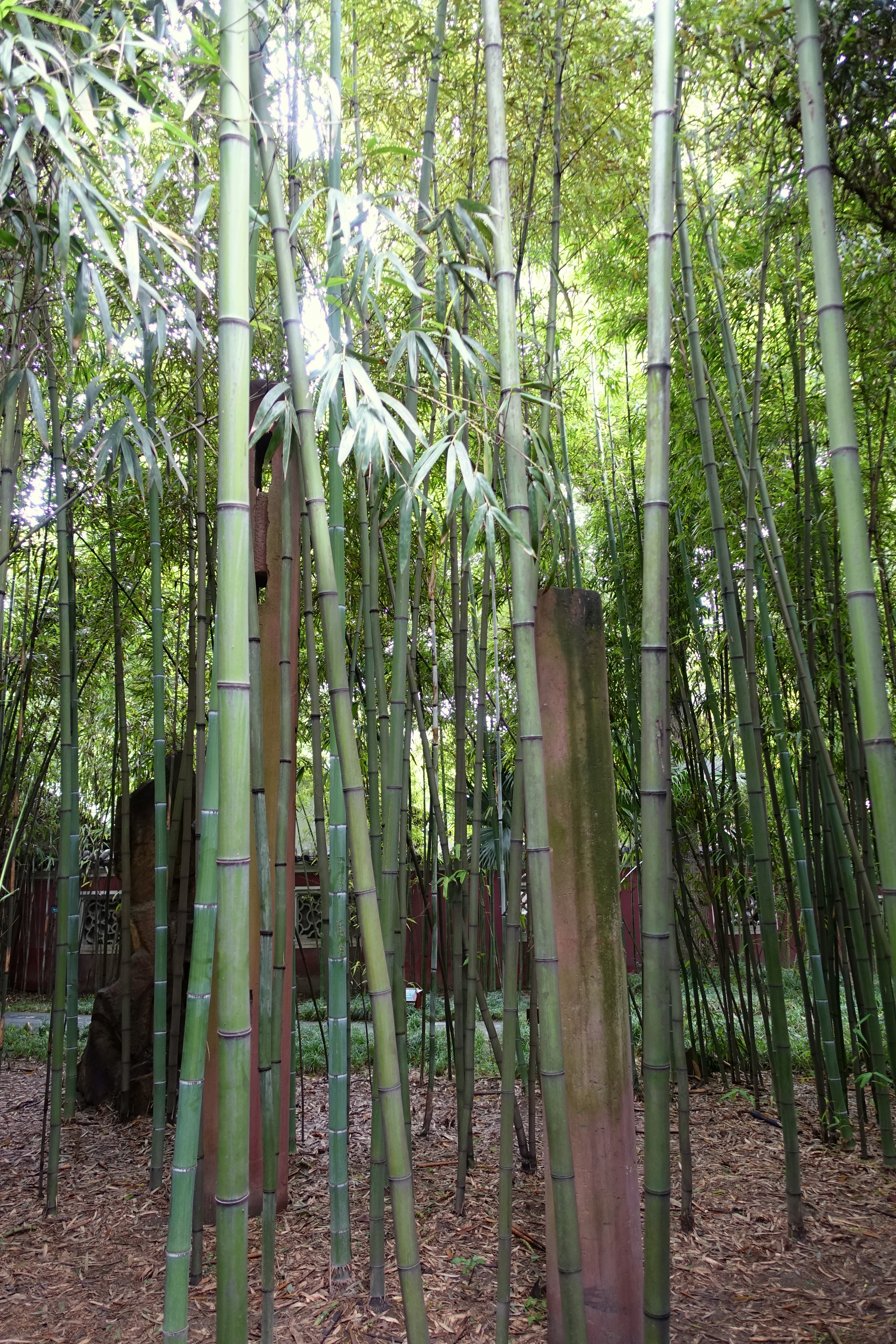

Scientific classification
- Kingdom: Plantae
- Clade: Tracheophytes
- Clade: Angiosperms
- Clade: Monocots
- Clade: Commelinids
- Order: Poales
- Family: Poaceae
- Genus: Phyllostachys
- Species: P. angusta

Binomial name
- Phyllostachys angusta McClure

Synonyms
- Phyllostachys angusta f. flavosulcata G.H.Lai

= Phyllostachys angusta =

Species of grass

Phyllostachys angusta is a species of bamboo in the family Poaceae. It is native to Anhui, Fujian, Henan, Jiangsu, Zhejiang provinces of China.
