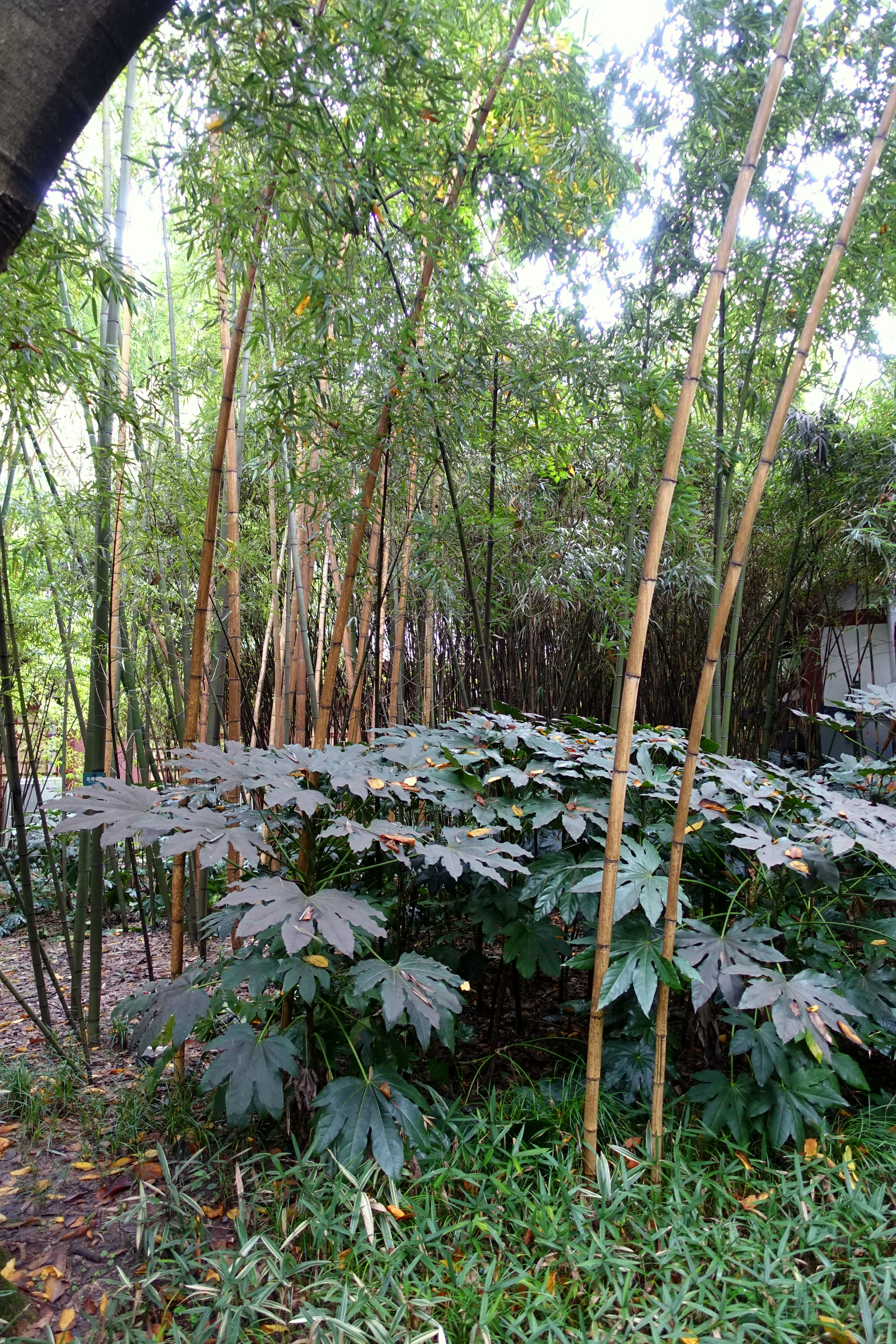

Scientific classification
- Kingdom: Plantae
- Clade: Tracheophytes
- Clade: Angiosperms
- Clade: Monocots
- Clade: Commelinids
- Order: Poales
- Family: Poaceae
- Genus: Phyllostachys
- Species: P. arcana

Binomial name
- Phyllostachys arcana McClure

Synonyms
- Phyllostachys sapida T.P. Yi; Phyllostachys arcana fo. luteosulcata C.D. Chu & C.S. Chao

= Phyllostachys arcana =

Species of grass

Phyllostachys arcana is a species of bamboo in the family Poaceae. It is native to Anhui, Gansu, Jiangsu, Shaanxi, Sichuan, Yunnan, Zhejiang provinces of China at elevations of 700 – 1800 meters
