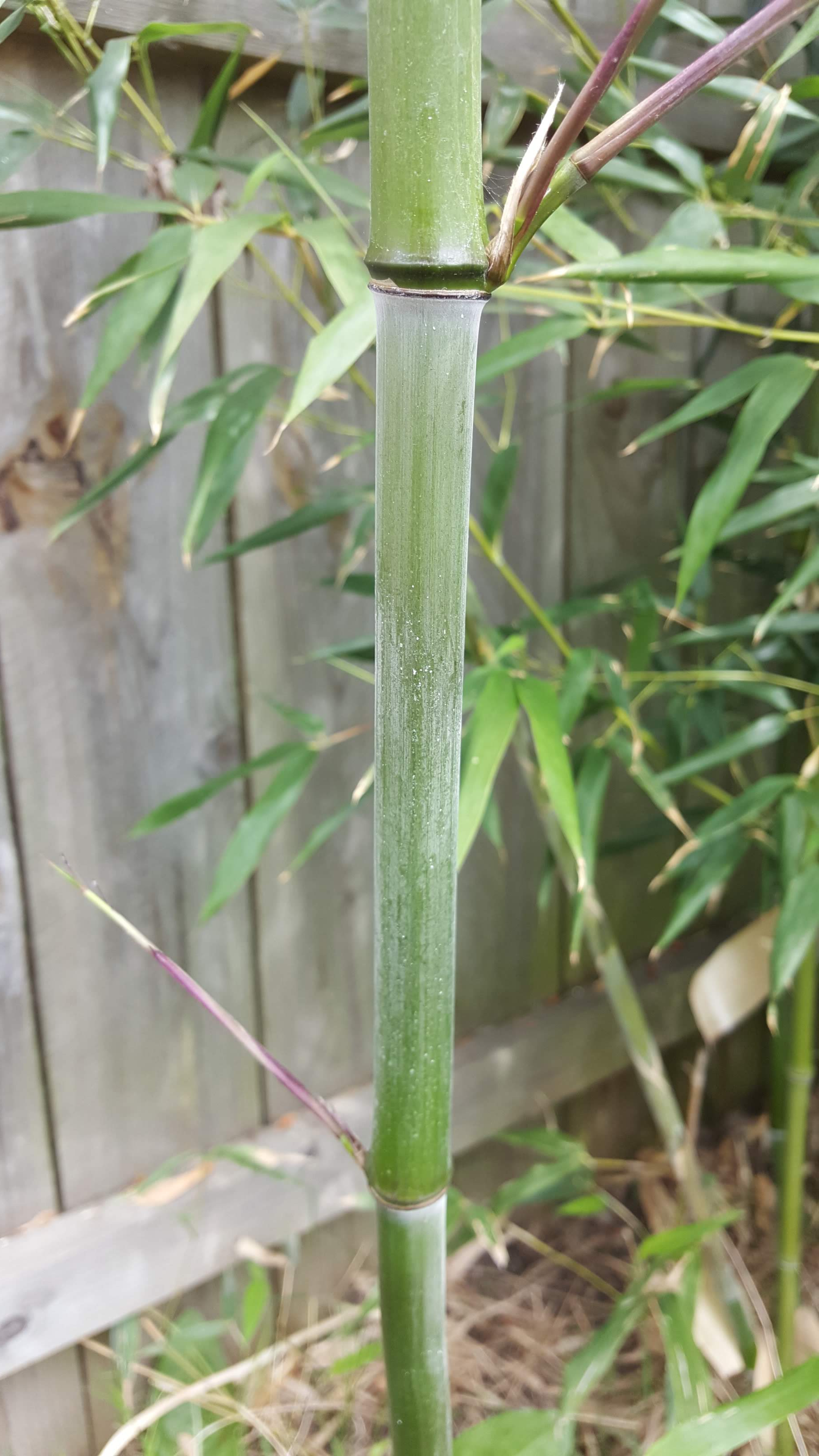

Scientific classification
- Kingdom: Plantae
- Clade: Tracheophytes
- Clade: Angiosperms
- Clade: Monocots
- Clade: Commelinids
- Order: Poales
- Family: Poaceae
- Genus: Phyllostachys
- Species: P. atrovaginata

Binomial name
- Phyllostachys atrovaginata C.S.Chao & H.Y.Chou

= Phyllostachys atrovaginata =

Species of grass

Phyllostachys atrovaginata
- Traditional Chinese: 烏芽竹
- Simplified Chinese: 乌芽竹
Transcriptions
Standard Mandarin
- Hanyu Pinyin: wū yá zhú

Phyllostachys atrovaginata is a running bamboo with strongly tapered, stiff, upright culms. It may reveal a fragrant scent during warm weather or when vigorously rubbed. The common name of "Incense bamboo" comes from the unique aroma. Its culms grow large in diameter relative to height. Maximum height can reach 10 m (33 ft) with a maximum culm diameter of 7.0 cm (2.7 in). This bamboo grows in areas ranging from subtropical to temperate and tolerates winter temperatures down to -23 °C (-10 °F), being a more cold-hardy bamboo. Like water bamboo, the rhizomes and roots of this species also have air canals as an adaptation for living in wet soil. The specific epithet atrovaginata or "dark-sheathed" is inspired from the dark green and deep red wine colors of the culm sheaths. P. atrovaginata has formerly been called Phyllostachys congesta.

Edible shoots can be harvested in spring from this cultivated species, while the culms can be used split or unsplit for weaving or crafting bamboo articles.
