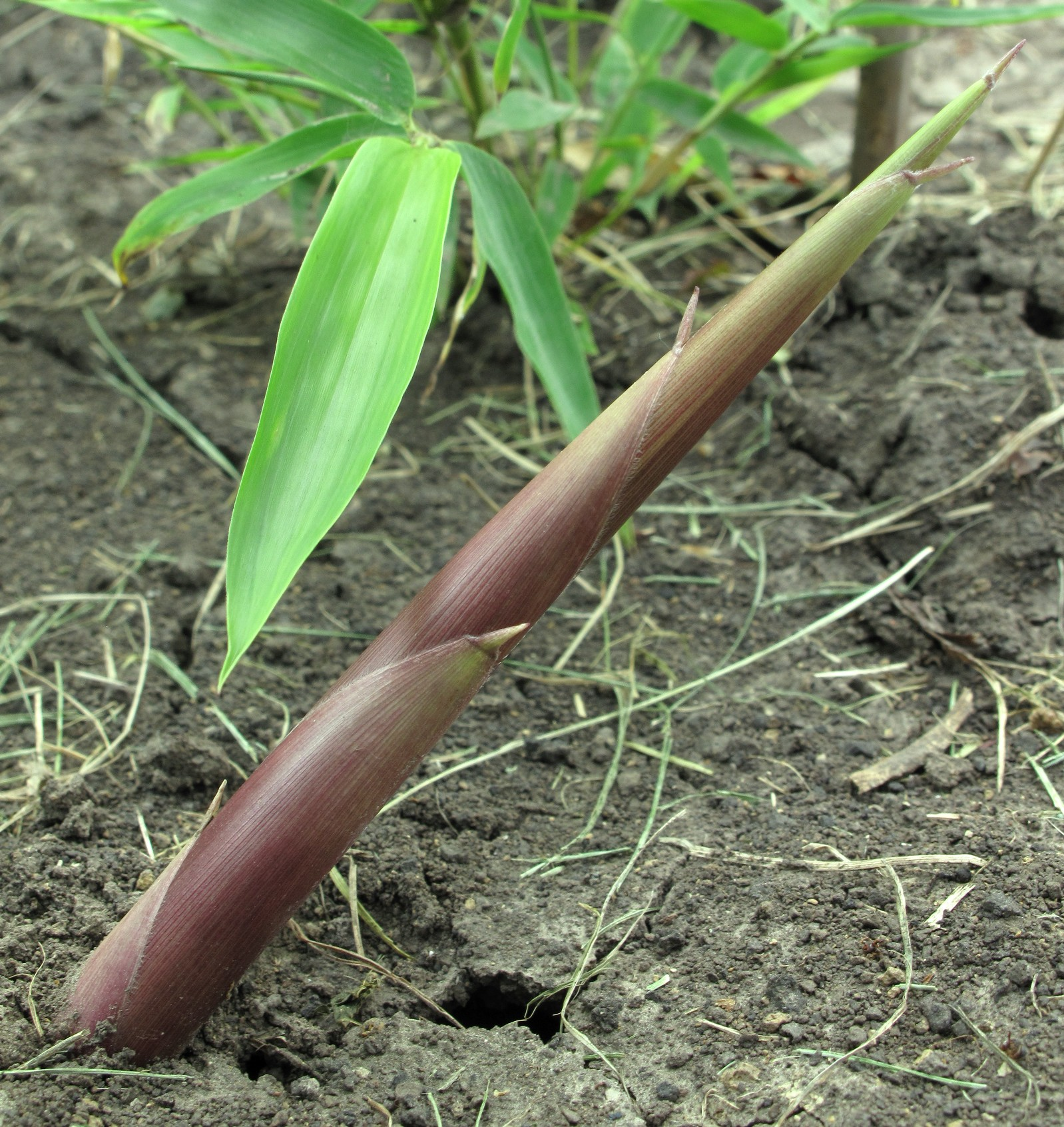

Scientific classification
- Kingdom: Plantae
- Clade: Tracheophytes
- Clade: Angiosperms
- Clade: Monocots
- Clade: Commelinids
- Order: Poales
- Family: Poaceae
- Genus: Phyllostachys
- Species: P. parvifolia

Binomial name
- Phyllostachys parvifolia C.D.Chu & H.Y.Chou

= Phyllostachys parvifolia =

Species of grass

Phyllostachys parvifolia
- Traditional Chinese: 安吉金竹
- Simplified Chinese: 安吉金竹
Transcriptions
Standard Mandarin
- Hanyu Pinyin: Ān jí jīn zhú

Phyllostachys parvifolia is a running bamboo with thick culms that grow tall for a bamboo that endures cold weather.

== Description ==
A potential giant even in cooler areas, this bamboo grows with an average height of 7 m (23 ft) reaching up to 12 m (39 ft) or more with a maximum culm diameter of 10 cm (3.9 in). New culms are dark green, paling with age, with a white ring appearing under each node. Branches are short and leaves are small for a bamboo of the genus Phyllostachys. Culm sheath colors of purple-red or brown fade or stripe into light colors of tan or yellow-white further up. Like water bamboo, the rhizomes and roots of this species have air canals as an adaptation for living in wet soil.

== Distribution ==
This bamboo grows in areas ranging from subtropical to temperate and tolerates winter temperatures down to −21 to −26 °C (−6 to −15 °F) being a more cold hardy bamboo. Its natural distribution in Asia is limited primarily to Zhejiang Province of China, where it is cultivated. Due to difficulties in propagation, availability in cultivation is limited.

== Name ==
Its common name Anji golden bamboo refers to Anji County of Zhejiang Province. The specific epithet parvifolia means "small-leaved".

== Usage ==
This species is grown mainly for edible shoots, while the culms have general purpose uses. Harvested moderately early, the shoots are of excellent flavor.
