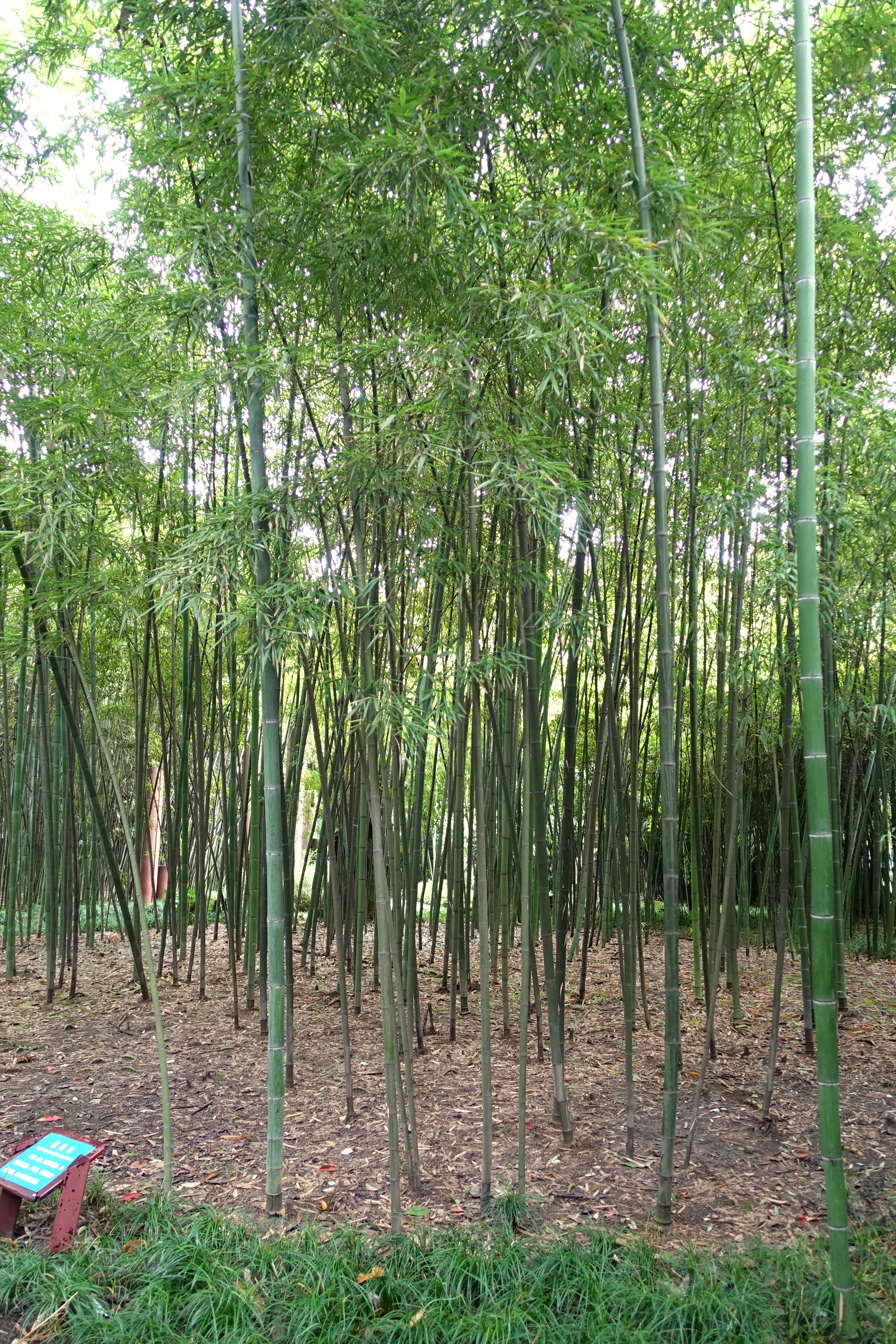

Scientific classification
- Kingdom: Plantae
- Clade: Tracheophytes
- Clade: Angiosperms
- Clade: Monocots
- Clade: Commelinids
- Order: Poales
- Family: Poaceae
- Genus: Phyllostachys
- Species: P. kwangsiensis

Binomial name
- Phyllostachys kwangsiensis W. Y. Hsiung 1980

= Phyllostachys kwangsiensis =

Species of grass

Phyllostachys kwangsiensis is a species of bamboo found in Guangxi, China
