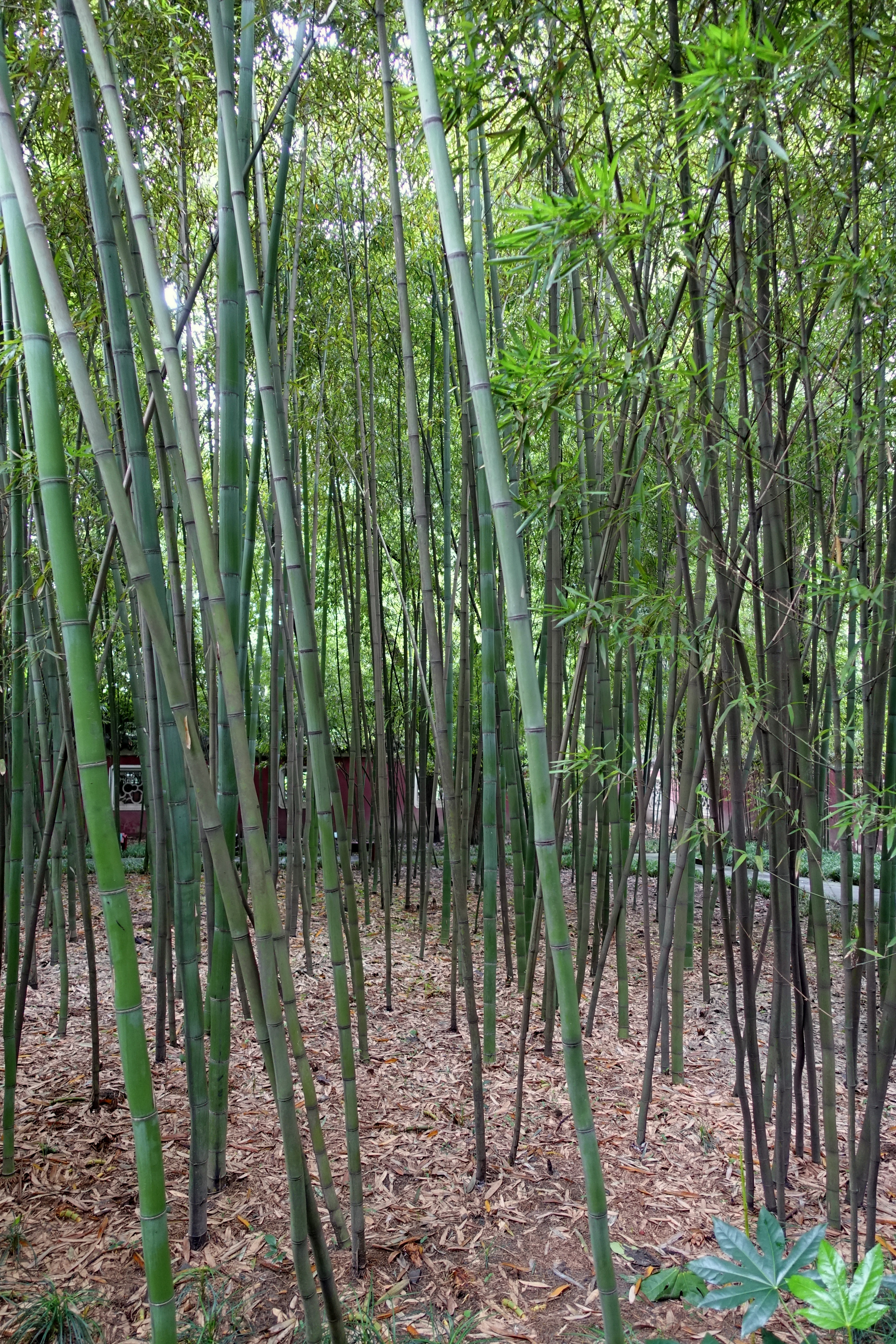

Scientific classification
- Kingdom: Plantae
- Clade: Embryophytes
- Clade: Tracheophytes
- Clade: Angiosperms
- Clade: Monocots
- Clade: Commelinids
- Order: Poales
- Family: Poaceae
- Genus: Phyllostachys
- Species: P. tianmuensis

Binomial name
- Phyllostachys tianmuensis Z. P. Wang & N. X. Ma 1983

= Phyllostachys tianmuensis =

Species of bamboo found in Anhui, Zhejiang provinces of China

Phyllostachys tianmuensis is a species of bamboo found in Anhui, Zhejiang provinces of China
