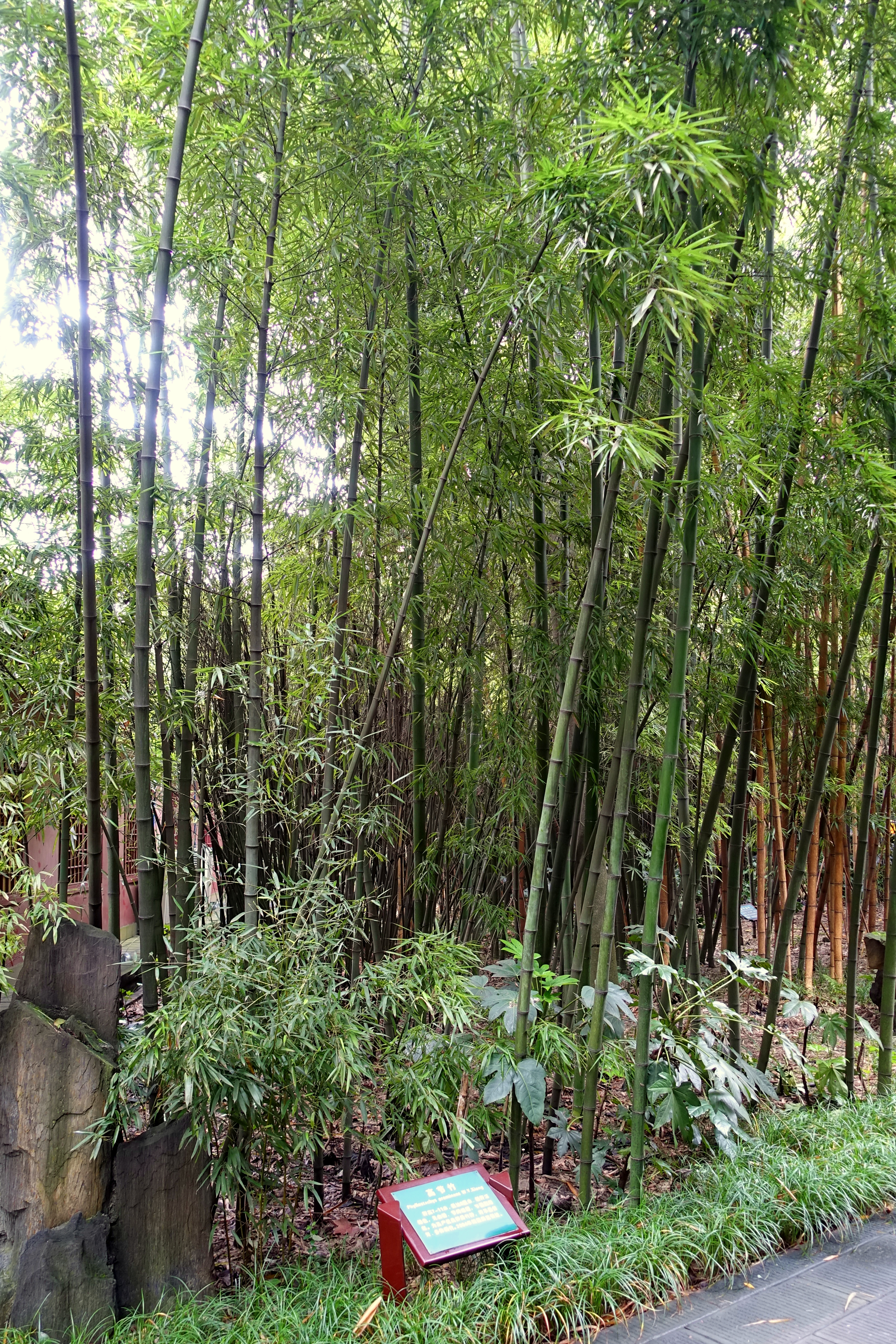

Scientific classification
- Kingdom: Plantae
- Clade: Tracheophytes
- Clade: Angiosperms
- Clade: Monocots
- Clade: Commelinids
- Order: Poales
- Family: Poaceae
- Genus: Phyllostachys
- Species: P. prominens

Binomial name
- Phyllostachys prominens W. Y. Xiong ex C. P. Wang et al. 1980

= Phyllostachys prominens =

Species of grass

Phyllostachys prominens is a species of bamboo found in Jiangsu, Zhejiang provinces of China
