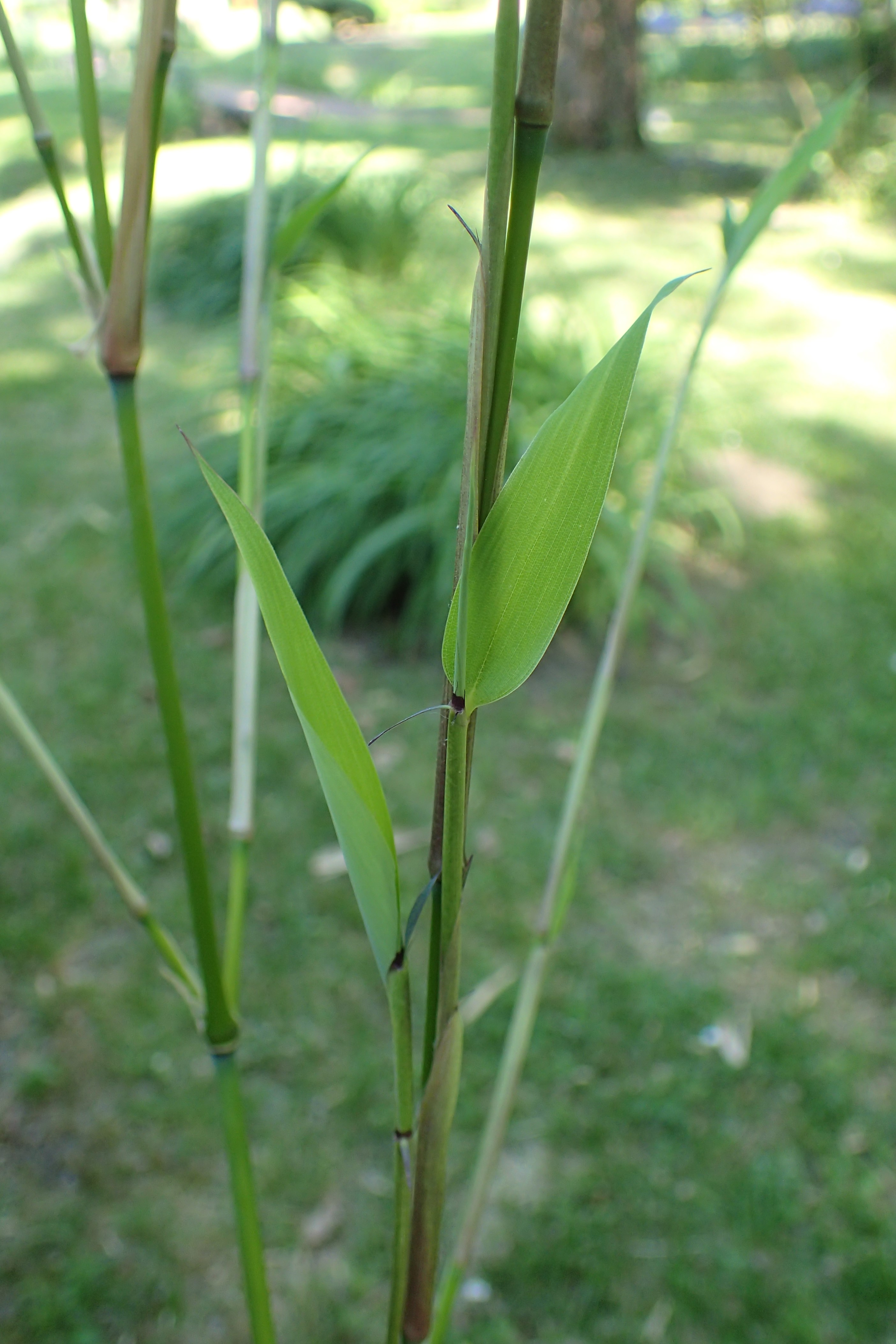

Scientific classification
- Kingdom: Plantae
- Clade: Tracheophytes
- Clade: Angiosperms
- Clade: Monocots
- Clade: Commelinids
- Order: Poales
- Family: Poaceae
- Genus: Phyllostachys
- Species: P. propinqua

Binomial name
- Phyllostachys propinqua McClure

Synonyms
- Phyllostachys propinqua f. lanuginosa T.H.Wen

= Phyllostachys propinqua =

Species of grass

Phyllostachys propinqua is a species of bamboo in the family Poaceae. It is native to the Chinese provinces of Anhui, Fujian, Guangxi, Guizhou, Henan, Hubei, Jiangsu, Jiangxi, Yunnan, and Zhejiang.
