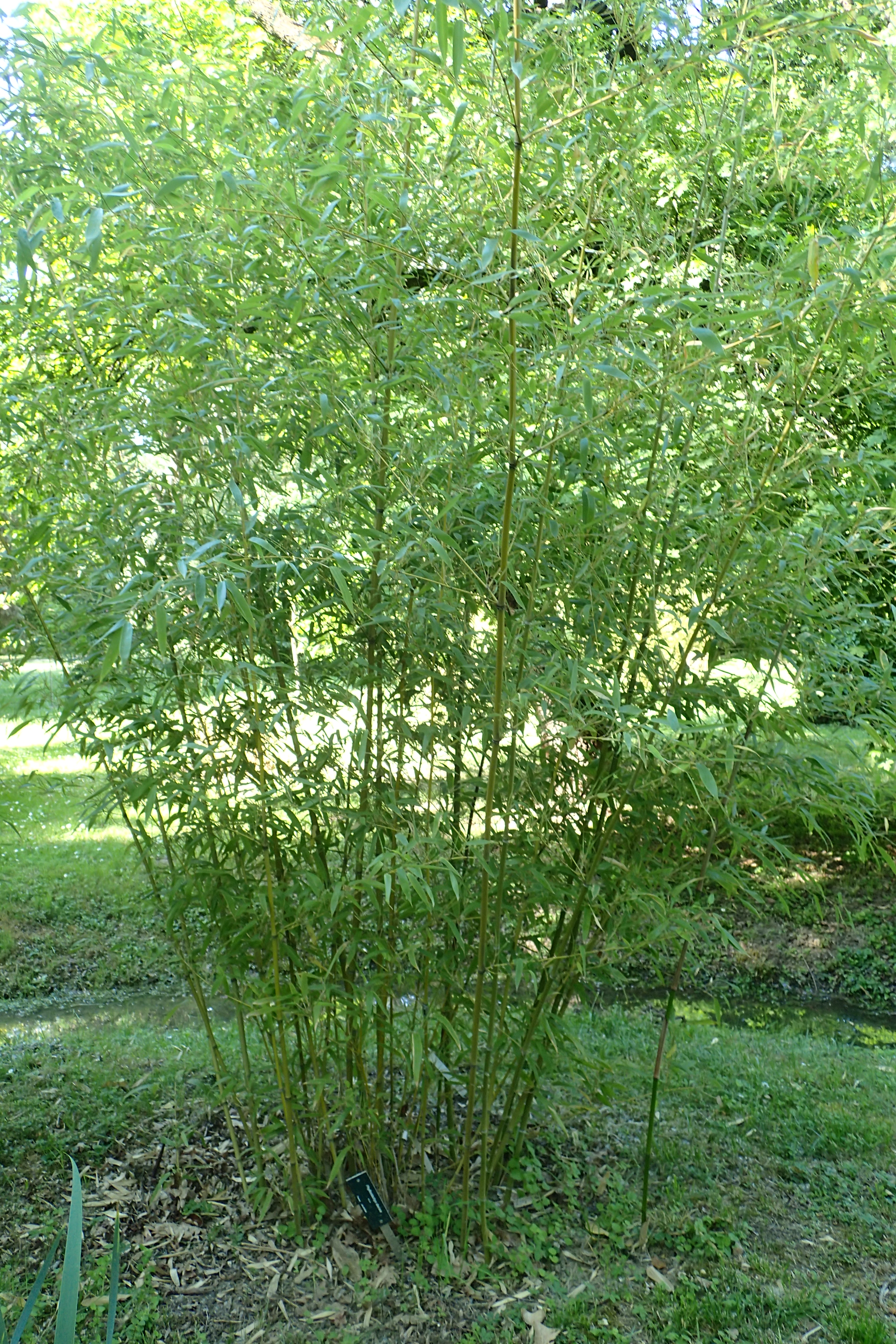

Scientific classification
- Kingdom: Plantae
- Clade: Tracheophytes
- Clade: Angiosperms
- Clade: Monocots
- Clade: Commelinids
- Order: Poales
- Family: Poaceae
- Genus: Phyllostachys
- Species: P. mannii

Binomial name
- Phyllostachys mannii Gamble

Synonyms
- Phyllostachys assamica Gamble; Phyllostachys bawa E.G.Camus; Phyllostachys decora McClure; Phyllostachys helva T.H.Wen; Phyllostachys sedan E.G.Camus

= Phyllostachys mannii =

Species of grass

Phyllostachys mannii is a species of flowering plant in the family Poaceae. It is a species of bamboo found in Guizhou, Henan, Jiangsu, Shaanxi, Sichuan, Xizang, Yunnan, Zhejiang provinces of China, Myanmar, and India.
