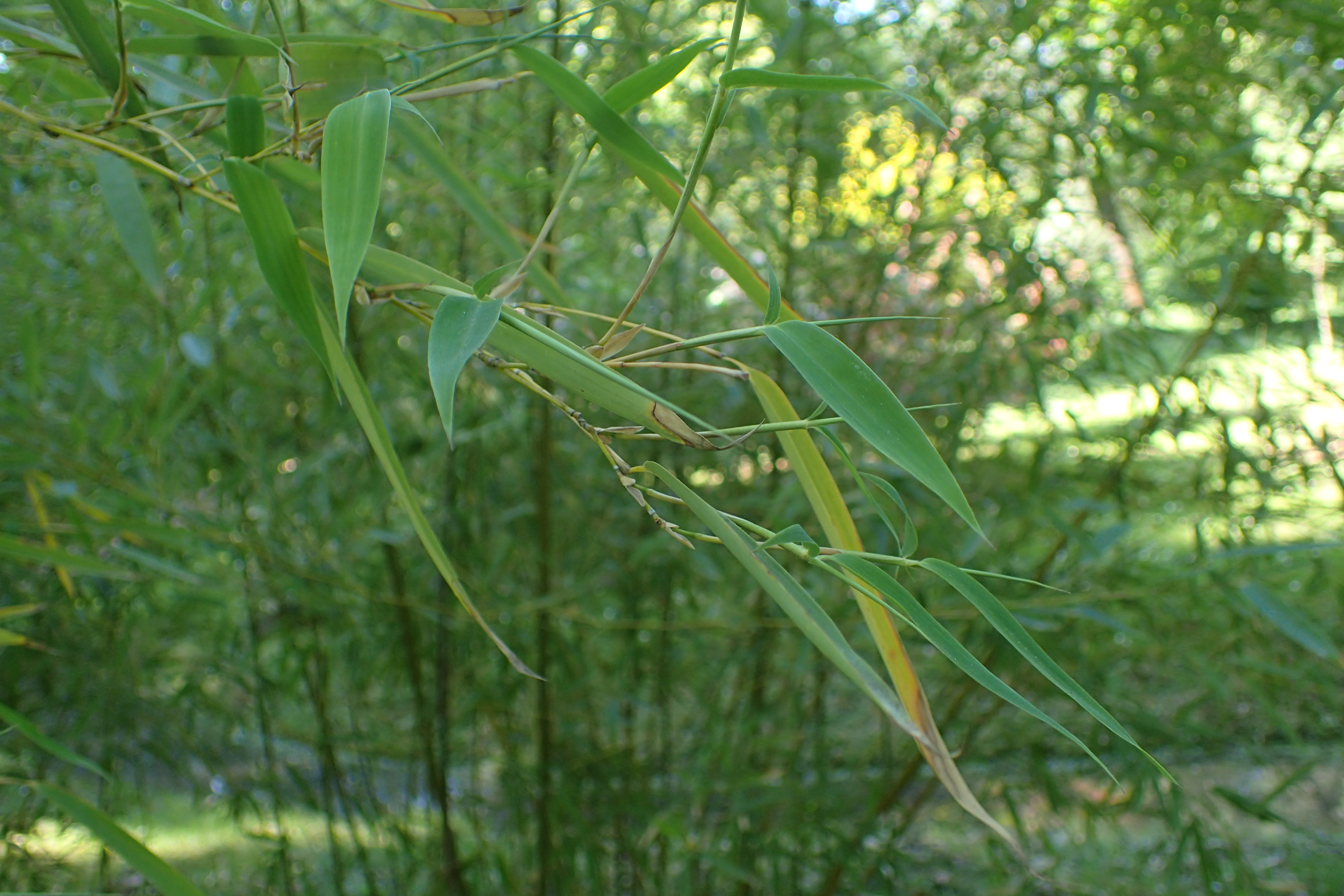

Scientific classification
- Kingdom: Plantae
- Clade: Tracheophytes
- Clade: Angiosperms
- Clade: Monocots
- Clade: Commelinids
- Order: Poales
- Family: Poaceae
- Genus: Phyllostachys
- Species: P. platyglossa

Binomial name
- Phyllostachys platyglossa Z. P. Wang & Z. H. Yu 1980

= Phyllostachys platyglossa =

Species of grass

Phyllostachys platyglossa is a species of bamboo found in Jiangsu, Zhejiang provinces of China
