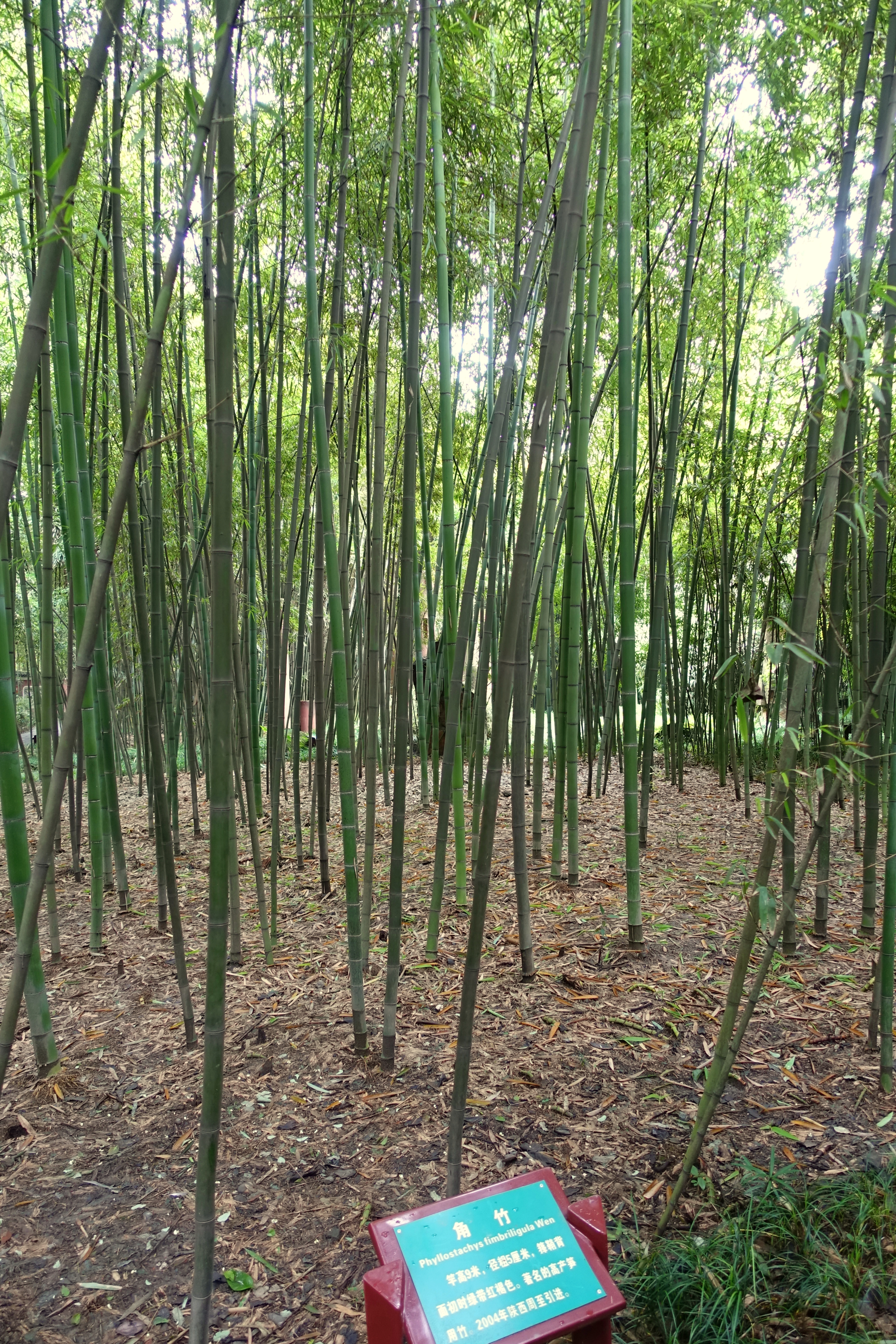

Scientific classification
- Kingdom: Plantae
- Clade: Tracheophytes
- Clade: Angiosperms
- Clade: Monocots
- Clade: Commelinids
- Order: Poales
- Family: Poaceae
- Genus: Phyllostachys
- Species: P. fimbriligula

Binomial name
- Phyllostachys fimbriligula T.H.Wen 1983

= Phyllostachys fimbriligula =

Species of grass

Phyllostachys fimbriligula is a species of bamboo found in Hunan, Jiangsu, Jiangxi, Zhejiang provinces of China.
