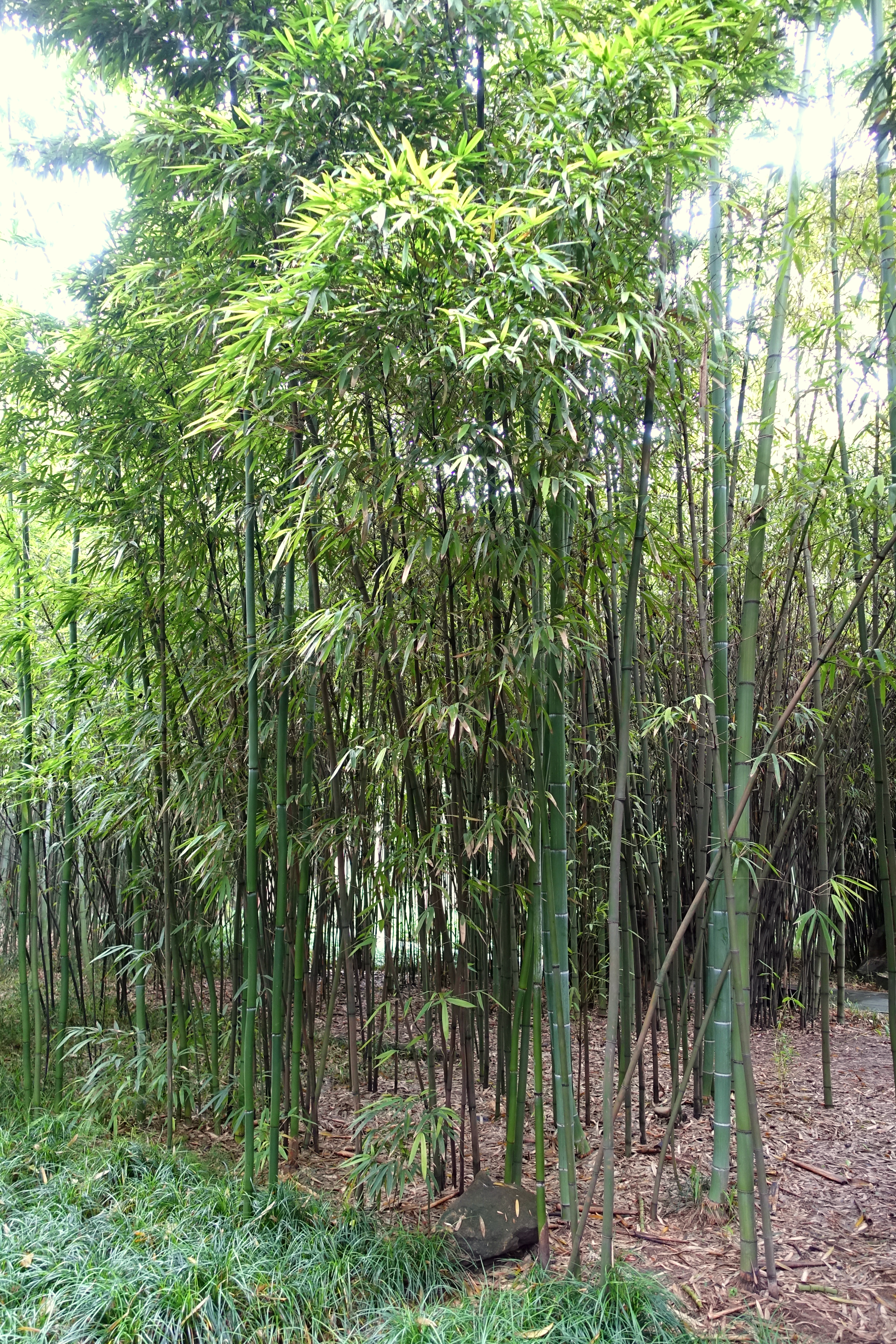

Scientific classification
- Kingdom: Plantae
- Clade: Tracheophytes
- Clade: Angiosperms
- Clade: Monocots
- Clade: Commelinids
- Order: Poales
- Family: Poaceae
- Genus: Phyllostachys
- Species: P. iridescens

Binomial name
- Phyllostachys iridescens C.Y.Yao & S.Y.Chen 1980

= Phyllostachys iridescens =

Species of grass

Phyllostachys iridescens is a species of bamboo found in Anhui, Jiangsu, Zhejiang provinces of China.
