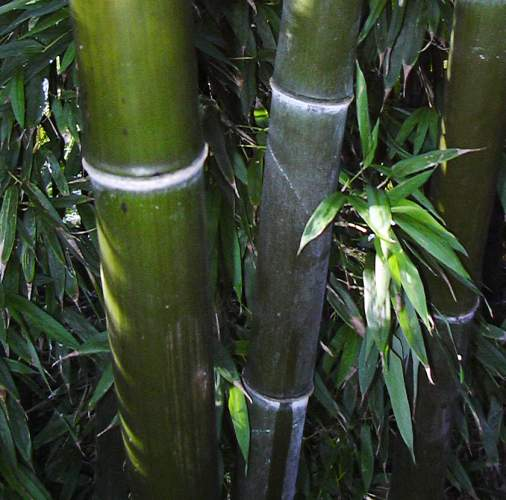
- Phyllostachys nigra

Scientific classification
- Kingdom: Plantae
- Clade: Tracheophytes
- Clade: Angiosperms
- Clade: Monocots
- Clade: Commelinids
- Order: Poales
- Family: Poaceae
- Subfamily: Bambusoideae
- Tribe: Arundinarieae
- Subtribe: Arundinariinae
- Genus: Phyllostachys; Siebold & Zucc.

Synonyms
- Sinoarundinaria Ohwi

= Phyllostachys =

Genus of grasses

Phyllostachys (/fɪˈlɒstəkɪs, faɪ-/) is a genus of Asian bamboo in the grass family. Many of the species are found in central and southern China, with a few species in northern Indochina and in the Himalayas. Some of the species have become naturalized in parts of Asia, South America, Australia, and southern Europe.

The stem or culm has a prominent groove, called a sulcus, that runs along the length of each segment (or internode). Because of this, it is one of the most easily identifiable genera of bamboo. Most of the species spread aggressively by underground rhizomes. Being pioneer plants, phyllostachys species will not spread quickly or achieve mature height without access to direct sunlight throughout most of the day.

Some species of Phyllostachys grow to 100 ft (30 m) tall in optimum conditions. Some of the larger species, sometimes known as "timber bamboo", are used as construction timber and for making furniture. Several species are cultivated as ornamental plants, though they can become invasive and troublesome in gardens, unless artificially restricted or grown in containers.

The name Phyllostachys means "leaf spike" and refers to the inflorescences.

== Taxonomy ==
Species

1. Phyllostachys acuta
2. Phyllostachys angusta
3. Phyllostachys arcana
4. Phyllostachys atrovaginata
5. Phyllostachys aurea
6. Phyllostachys aureosulcata
7. Phyllostachys bambusoides
8. Phyllostachys bissetii
9. Phyllostachys carnea
10. Phyllostachys circumpilis
11. Phyllostachys dulcis
12. Phyllostachys edulis
13. Phyllostachys elegans
14. Phyllostachys fimbriligula
15. Phyllostachys flexuosa
16. Phyllostachys glabrata
17. Phyllostachys glauca
18. Phyllostachys guizhouensis
19. Phyllostachys heteroclada
20. Phyllostachys incarnata
21. Phyllostachys iridescens
22. Phyllostachys kwangsiensis
23. Phyllostachys lofushanensis
24. Phyllostachys mannii
25. Phyllostachys meyeri
26. Phyllostachys nidularia
27. Phyllostachys nigella
28. Phyllostachys nigra
29. Phyllostachys nuda
30. Phyllostachys parvifolia
31. Phyllostachys platyglossa
32. Phyllostachys prominens
33. Phyllostachys propinqua
34. Phyllostachys rivalis
35. Phyllostachys robustiramea
36. Phyllostachys rubicunda
37. Phyllostachys rubromarginata
38. Phyllostachys rutila
39. Phyllostachys shuchengensis
40. Phyllostachys stimulosa
41. Phyllostachys sulphurea
42. Phyllostachys tianmuensis
43. Phyllostachys varioauriculata
44. Phyllostachys veitchiana
45. Phyllostachys verrucosa
46. Phyllostachys violascens
47. Phyllostachys virella
48. Phyllostachys viridiglaucescens
49. Phyllostachys vivax

Formerly included

species now considered better suited to other genera: Bambusa Chimonobambusa Pseudosasa Semiarundinaria Shibataea

- Phyllostachys fastuosa – Semiarundinaria fastuosa
- Phyllostachys kumasasa – Shibataea kumasasa
- Phyllostachys marmorea – Chimonobambusa marmorea
- Phyllostachys maudiae – Pseudosasa hindsii
- Phyllostachys mitis – Bambusa vulgaris
- Phyllostachys quadrangularis – Chimonobambusa quadrangularis
- Phyllostachys ruscifolia – Shibataea kumasasa

== Ecology ==
Fungi and pathogens growing specifically on Phyllostachys have phyllostachydis or phyllostachydicola species epithets.

== Regulations ==
Connecticut property owners are liable for the cost of removing Phyllostachys bamboo that grows onto neighboring property, any resulting damages, and fines of $100 per day for growing this bamboo within 40 ft of any adjoining property or public way.

New York has regulations listing P. aurea and P. aureosulcata as prohibited invasive species.
