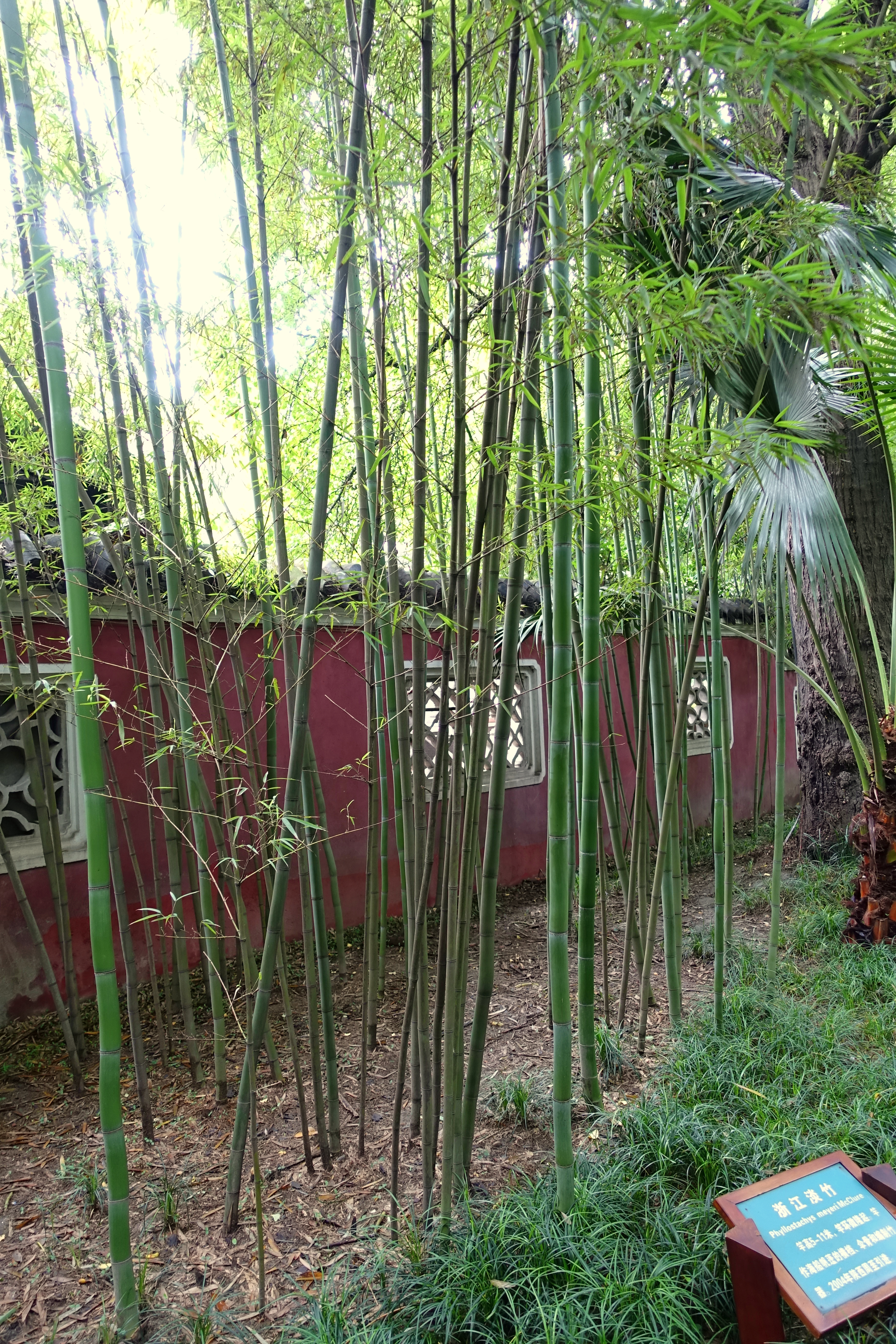

Scientific classification
- Kingdom: Plantae
- Clade: Tracheophytes
- Clade: Angiosperms
- Clade: Monocots
- Clade: Commelinids
- Order: Poales
- Family: Poaceae
- Genus: Phyllostachys
- Species: P. meyeri

Binomial name
- Phyllostachys meyeri McClure

Synonyms
- Phyllostachys meyeri f. sphaeroidea T.H.Wen

= Phyllostachys meyeri =

Species of grass

Phyllostachys meyeri is a species of bamboo in the family Poaceae. It is native to Hunan, China in open forest at elevations around 600 meters
