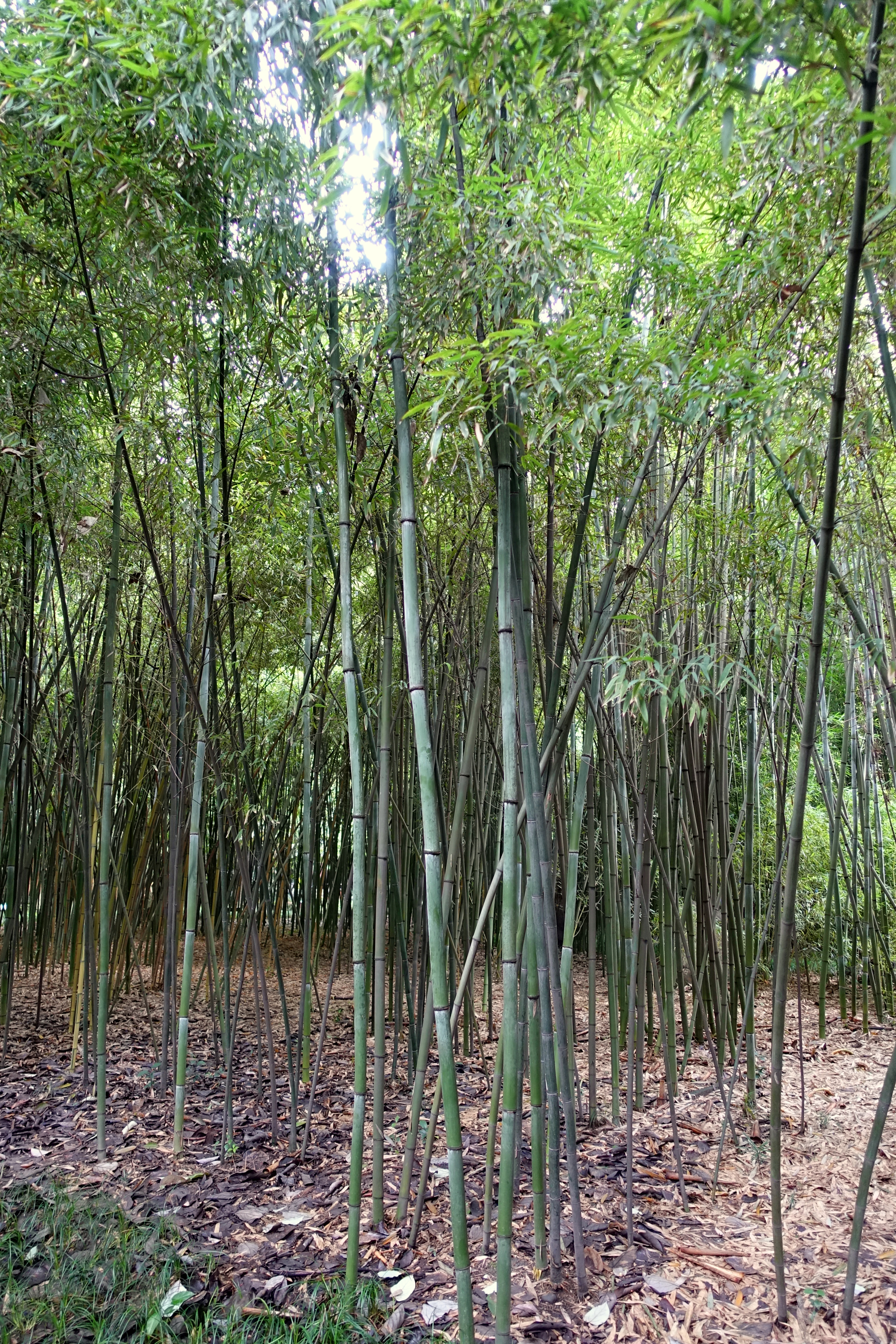

Scientific classification
- Kingdom: Plantae
- Clade: Tracheophytes
- Clade: Angiosperms
- Clade: Monocots
- Clade: Commelinids
- Order: Poales
- Family: Poaceae
- Genus: Phyllostachys
- Species: P. nuda

Binomial name
- Phyllostachys nuda McClure

Synonyms
- Heterotypic Synonyms: Phyllostachys nuda f. localis C.P.Wang & Z.H.Yu; Phyllostachys nuda f. lucida T.H.Wen; Phyllostachys nuda f. purpurascens C.S.Chao & H.Y.Chou

= Phyllostachys nuda =

Species of grass

Phyllostachys nuda (also known as Nude sheath bamboo or Snow bamboo) is a species of bamboo in the family Poaceae. It is native to Anhui, Fujian, Hunan, Jiangsu, Jiangxi, Shaanxi, Zhejiang provinces of China and in Taiwan. It can survive temperatures down to −10 °F (−23 °C) and requires full sun to thrive.
