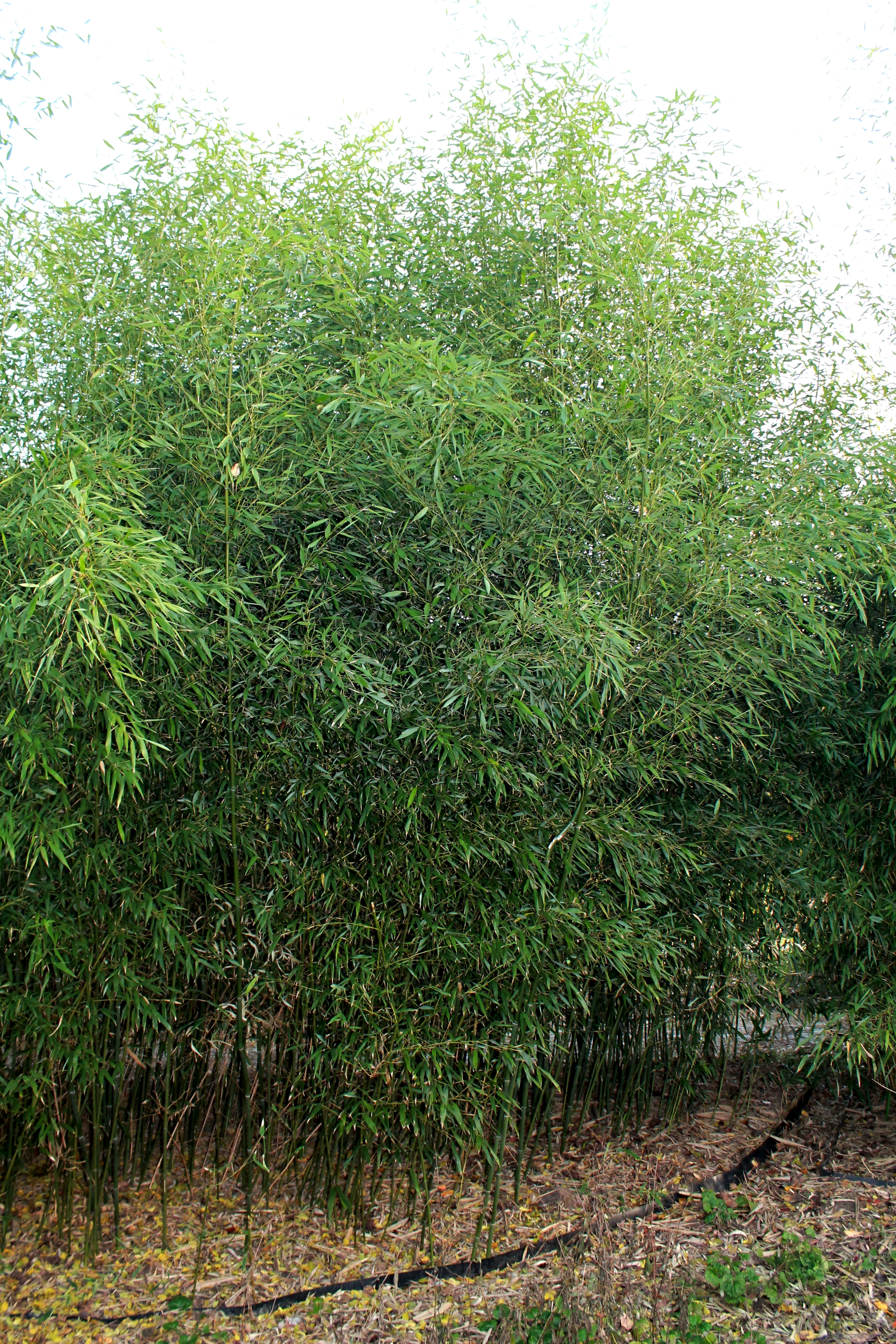

Scientific classification
- Kingdom: Plantae
- Clade: Tracheophytes
- Clade: Angiosperms
- Clade: Monocots
- Clade: Commelinids
- Order: Poales
- Family: Poaceae
- Genus: Phyllostachys
- Species: P. bissetii

Binomial name
- Phyllostachys bissetii McClure

= Phyllostachys bissetii =

Species of grass

Phyllostachys bissetii is a species of bamboo in the family Poaceae. It is native to Sichuan, Zhejiang provinces of China and introduced elsewhere. It is among the most cold-hardy bamboos. Its culms are relatively thin for its height in comparison to other running bamboo species.
