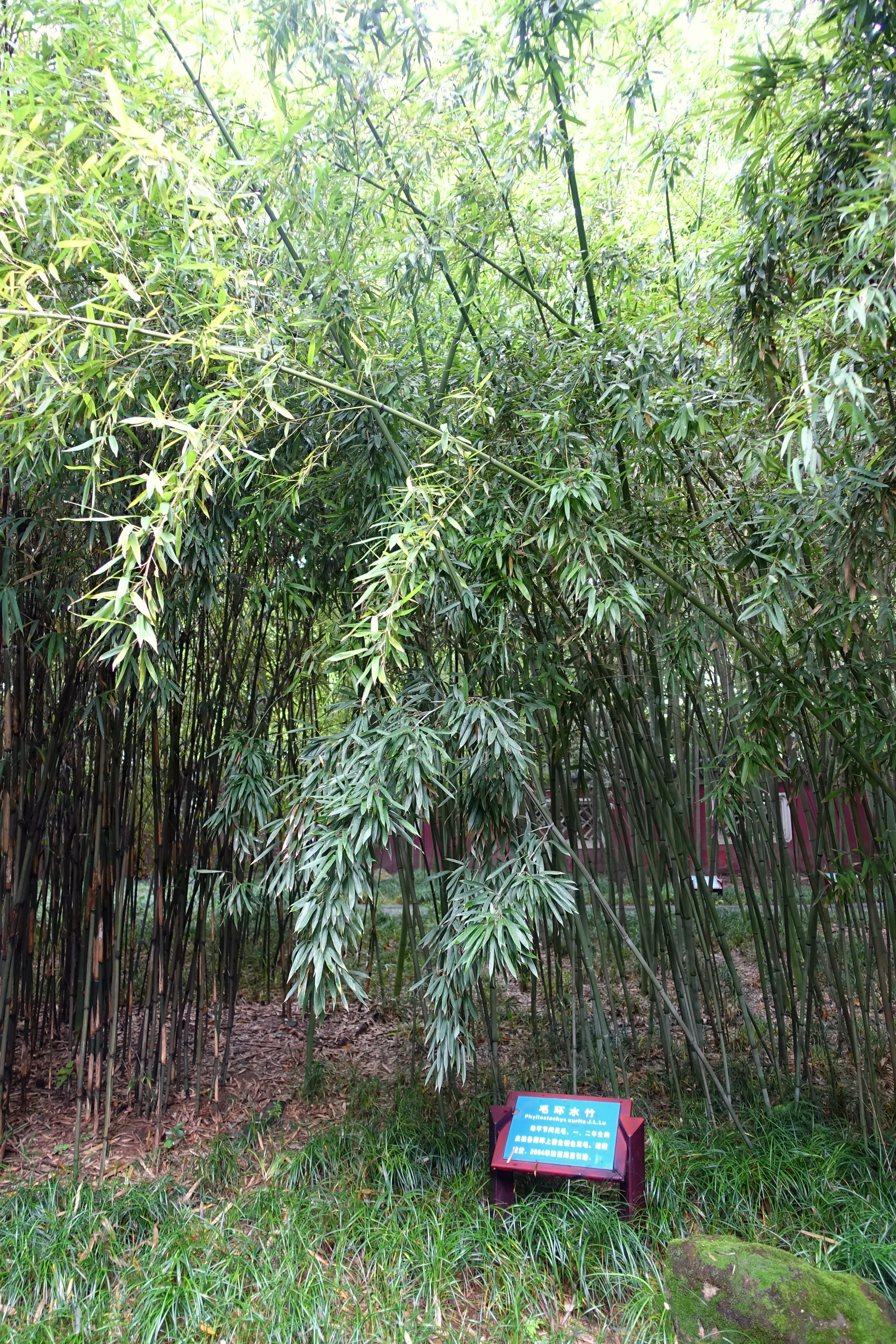

Scientific classification
- Kingdom: Plantae
- Clade: Tracheophytes
- Clade: Angiosperms
- Clade: Monocots
- Clade: Commelinids
- Order: Poales
- Family: Poaceae
- Genus: Phyllostachys
- Species: P. rubromarginata

Binomial name
- Phyllostachys rubromarginata McClure

Synonyms
- Heterotypic Synonyms: Phyllostachys aristata W.T.Lin; Phyllostachys aurita J.L.Lu; Sinobambusa fimbriata T.H.Wen

= Phyllostachys rubromarginata =

Species of grass

Phyllostachys rubromarginata, the reddish bamboo or red margin bamboo, is a species of bamboo in the family Poaceae. It is native to Central China, specifically Guangxi and Guizhou.

== Name ==
Its common name comes from the colorization of the margins of the newly sprouted culm sheaths, exhibiting a reddish stripe. It was classified by the Smithsonian's Floyd McClure in 1940. In China, it is named hongbian zhu or nuer zhu (maiden's bamboo).

== Description ==
Red margin bamboo is a cold-hardy, temperate mountain bamboo which grows and spreads quickly, creating a tall screen, and reproducing by running underground rhizomes.

Phyllostachys rubromarginata culms may reach as high as 4 to 9 m (13 to 30 ft), while in China, it is reported as high as 16 m (52 ft). Mature culms grow from 2.5 to 6 cm (0.98 to 2.36 in)diameter with dark green internodes 22–31 cm (8.5–12 in) apart. It is cold tolerant to between −16 and −24 °C (3 and −11 °F).

== Usage and distribution ==
Its high-quality timber is used in basket making, and has become a popular ornamental plant in North America. The shoots are edible. It grows wild in Guangxi and Guizhou as scrub and along banks of gullies. It is commonly cultivated in Henan, China.
