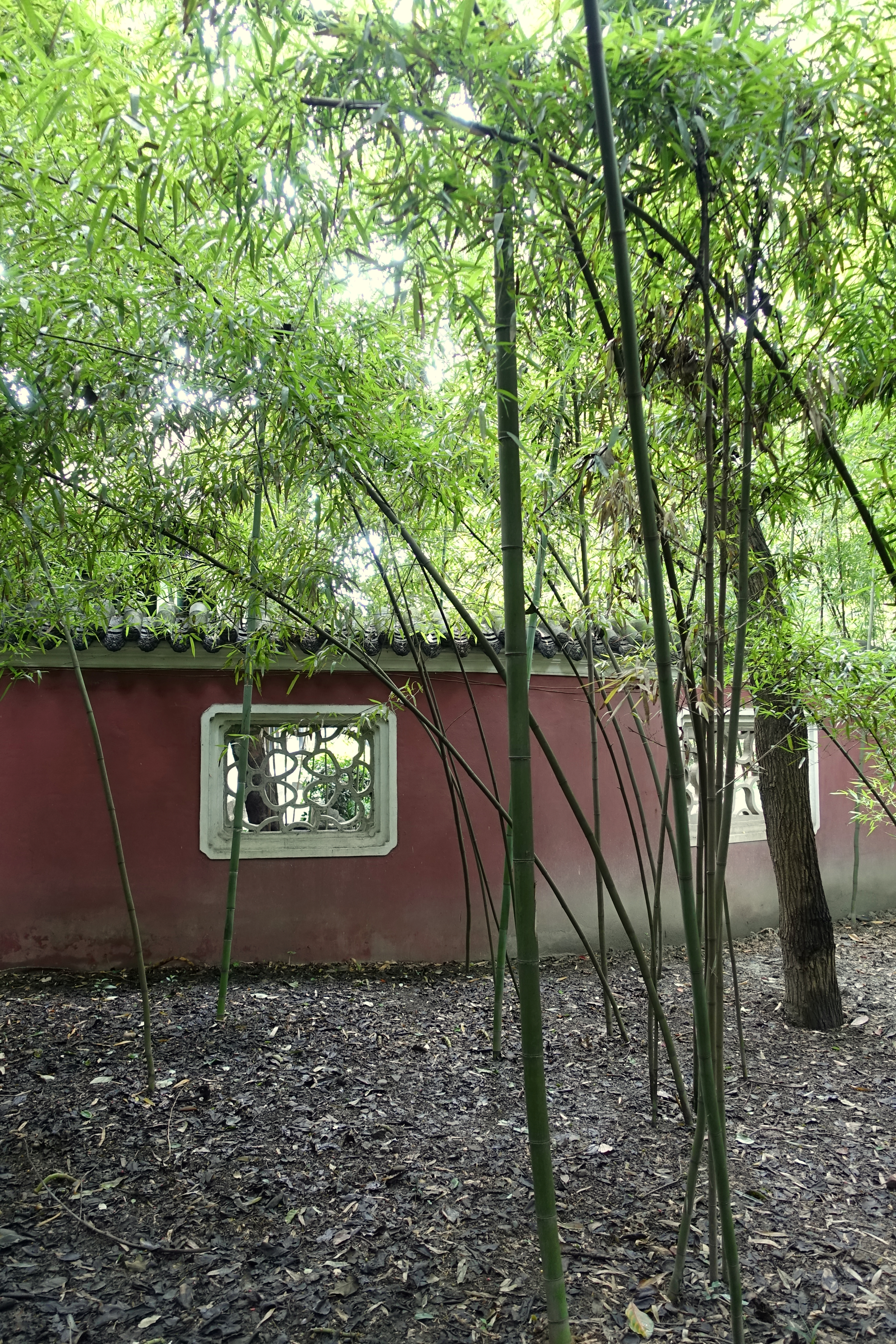

Scientific classification
- Kingdom: Plantae
- Clade: Tracheophytes
- Clade: Angiosperms
- Clade: Monocots
- Clade: Commelinids
- Order: Poales
- Family: Poaceae
- Genus: Phyllostachys
- Species: P. nidularia

Binomial name
- Phyllostachys nidularia Munro 1876

Synonyms
- Phyllostachys cantoniensis W. T. Lin; Phyllostachys subulata W. T. Lin & Z. M. Wu.

= Phyllostachys nidularia =

Species of grass

Phyllostachys nidularia is a species of bamboo found in Guangdong, Guangxi, Henan, Hubei, Jiangxi, Shaanxi, Yunnan, Zhejiang province of China at elevations below 1300 meters
