= Générargues =

- Commune
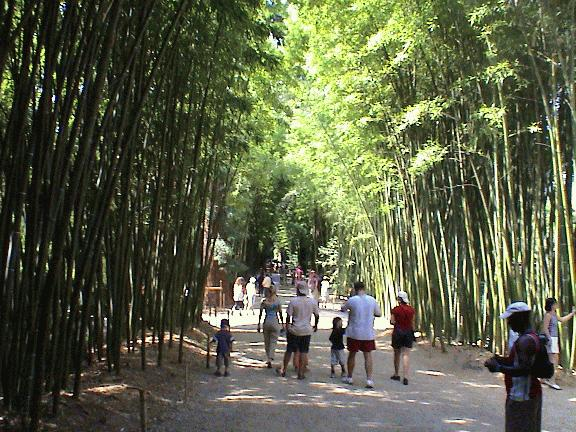
- Bambouseraie d'Anduze

- Coat of arms
- Location of Générargues
- Location within France Location within Occitanie
- Coordinates: 44°04′58″N 3°59′03″E
- Country: France
- Region: Occitania
- Department: Gard
- Arrondissement: Alès
- Canton: Alès-1
- Intercommunality: Alès Agglomération

Government
  - Mayor (2020–2026): Thierry Jacot
- Area^{1}: 10.24 km^{2} (3.95 sq mi)
- Elevation: 152 m (499 ft)
- Highest elevation: 420 m (1,380 ft)
- Lowest elevation: 128 m (420 ft)
- Population (2023): 727
  - Density: 71.0/km^{2} (184/sq mi)
- Time zone: UTC+01:00 (CET)
  - Summer (DST): UTC+02:00 (CEST)
- INSEE/Postal code: 30129 /30140
- ^{1} French Land Register data, which excludes lakes, ponds, glaciers > 1 km^{2} (0.386 sq mi or 247 acres) and river estuaries.

Générargues (French pronunciation: [ʒeneʁaʁɡ]; Occitan: Generargues) is a commune in the Gard department in southern France, around 10 km southwest of Alès.

== Geography ==
=== Climate ===
Générargues has a hot-summer Mediterranean climate (Köppen climate classification Csa). The average annual temperature in Générargues is 14.2 °C (57.6 °F). The average annual rainfall is 1,239.7 mm (48.81 in) with October as the wettest month. The temperatures are highest on average in July, at around 23.6 °C (74.5 °F), and lowest in January, at around 6.0 °C (42.8 °F). The highest temperature ever recorded in Générargues was 43.3 °C (109.9 °F) on 28 June 2019; the coldest temperature ever recorded was −17.0 °C (1.4 °F) on 4 February 1963.

Climate data for Générargues (1991−2020 normals, extremes 1949−present)
Month	Jan	Feb	Mar	Apr	May	Jun	Jul	Aug	Sep	Oct	Nov	Dec	Year
Record high °C (°F)	21.6 (70.9)	24.5 (76.1)	28.3 (82.9)	30.5 (86.9)	37.0 (98.6)	43.3 (109.9)	41.0 (105.8)	42.1 (107.8)	37.2 (99.0)	32.9 (91.2)	26.0 (78.8)	21.8 (71.2)	43.3 (109.9)
Mean daily maximum °C (°F)	11.2 (52.2)	12.8 (55.0)	16.7 (62.1)	19.5 (67.1)	23.7 (74.7)	28.2 (82.8)	31.4 (88.5)	31.1 (88.0)	25.8 (78.4)	20.2 (68.4)	14.9 (58.8)	11.5 (52.7)	20.6 (69.1)
Daily mean °C (°F)	6.0 (42.8)	6.7 (44.1)	10.1 (50.2)	12.9 (55.2)	16.9 (62.4)	21.0 (69.8)	23.6 (74.5)	23.3 (73.9)	19.0 (66.2)	14.8 (58.6)	9.8 (49.6)	6.5 (43.7)	14.2 (57.6)
Mean daily minimum °C (°F)	0.8 (33.4)	0.7 (33.3)	3.5 (38.3)	6.4 (43.5)	10.0 (50.0)	13.7 (56.7)	15.9 (60.6)	15.6 (60.1)	12.1 (53.8)	9.3 (48.7)	4.7 (40.5)	1.5 (34.7)	7.8 (46.0)
Record low °C (°F)	−14.0 (6.8)	−17.0 (1.4)	−10.4 (13.3)	−4.0 (24.8)	−1.0 (30.2)	3.0 (37.4)	7.0 (44.6)	7.0 (44.6)	1.0 (33.8)	−3.0 (26.6)	−9.5 (14.9)	−13.0 (8.6)	−17.0 (1.4)
Average precipitation mm (inches)	99.0 (3.90)	70.4 (2.77)	91.8 (3.61)	99.8 (3.93)	101.5 (4.00)	49.1 (1.93)	41.0 (1.61)	56.1 (2.21)	171.7 (6.76)	178.2 (7.02)	162.3 (6.39)	118.8 (4.68)	1,239.7 (48.81)
Average precipitation days (≥ 1.0 mm)	7.8	5.8	5.9	7.6	7.9	5.3	4.3	4.8	6.1	9.6	9.0	7.9	82.1
Source: Météo-France

== Population ==
Historical population
Year	Pop.	±% p.a.
1968	377	—
1975	406	+1.06%
1982	491	+2.75%
1990	546	+1.34%
1999	639	+1.76%
2007	690	+0.96%
2012	709	+0.54%
2017	699	−0.28%
2023	727	+0.66%
Source: INSEE

== See also ==
- Bambouseraie de Prafrance
- Communes of the Gard department
