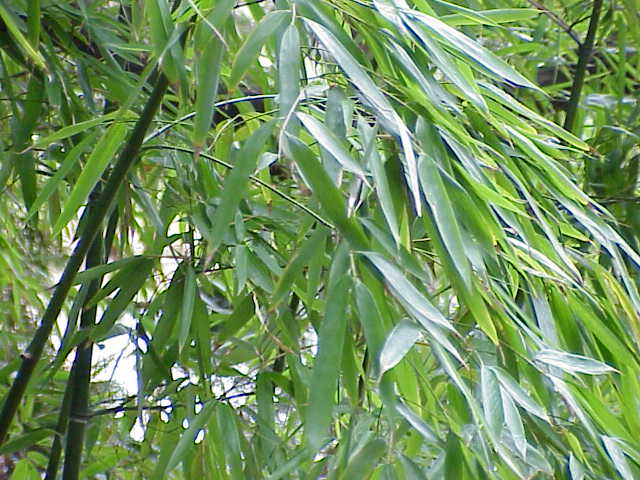

Scientific classification
- Kingdom: Plantae
- Clade: Tracheophytes
- Clade: Angiosperms
- Clade: Monocots
- Clade: Commelinids
- Order: Poales
- Family: Poaceae
- Genus: Phyllostachys
- Species: P. aurea

Binomial name
- Phyllostachys aurea Rivière & C.Rivière; Bull. Soc. Natl. Acclim. France sér. 3, 5:716, fig. 36. 1878

Synonyms
- Bambos koteisik Siebold; Bambusa aurea Carrière; Bambusa koteisik Zoll.; P. breviligula W.T.Lin & Z.M.Wu; P. formosana Hayata; P. takemurae Muroi; Sinoarundinaria formosa (Hayata) Ohwi ex Mayeb.

= Phyllostachys aurea =

Fishpole bamboo

Species of grass

Phyllostachys aurea is a species of bamboo, and is of the 'running bamboo' type, belonging to the diverse Bambuseae tribe. It is native to Fujian and Zhejiang in China. It is commonly known by the names fishpole bamboo, golden bamboo, monk's belly bamboo, and fairyland bamboo (Australia).

== Cultivation ==
Phyllostachys aurea is cultivated as an ornamental plant for gardens. In the United States, Australia, South Africa and Italy, it is considered an invasive species that crowds out native species and becomes a monoculture that is difficult to remove. It is a cold-hardy bamboo, performing well in USDA zones 6 to 10, (Connecticut to Florida). In the UK it has gained the Royal Horticultural Society's Award of Garden Merit. It is a tall evergreen species growing to 8 m (26 ft) tall by 4 m (13 ft) broad. Like most bamboos it can become invasive if kept in warm, moist conditions in good quality soil with access to full sunlight. It is a prohibited species in New York.

=== Cultivars ===
Cultivars include:

- P. aurea 'Flavescens Inversa' – some lower culms may show a pale yellow stripe on the sulcus
- P. aurea 'Holochrysa' – common name "golden golden", culms turn yellow/gold sooner than the type form, random leaves have a yellow stripe
- P. aurea 'Koi' – culms turn yellow, but sulcus stays green, random leaves have a yellow stripe
- P. aurea 'Takemurai' – culms grow taller and lack the compressed internodes of the type form

== Uses ==
P. aurea's lush foliage makes it desirable for ornamental purposes and privacy hedges, and its characteristic 'knotty' compressed lower internodes render it desirable among collectors. It is well-suited to the making of bamboo pipes.

== Identification and growth habit ==
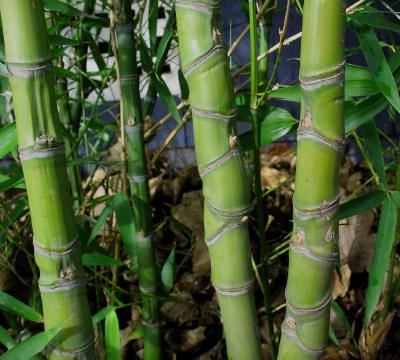
Compressed internodes with tortoiseshell-like appearance

The common forms of P. aurea are easily identified by their characteristic compressed internodes in the lower part of the canes which have a tortoise shell-like appearance. This internodal compression result in shorter heights (25 ft) and thicker cane diameters (relative to height) than many other Phyllostachys species.

The canes turn yellow in full or partial sun, and deepen into a gold-orange color as the plant matures. Branching and foliage tend to start lower to the ground than many other Phyllostachys species, but some prefer to cut off lower branches to show off the interesting 'tortoise shell' lower part of the canes.
