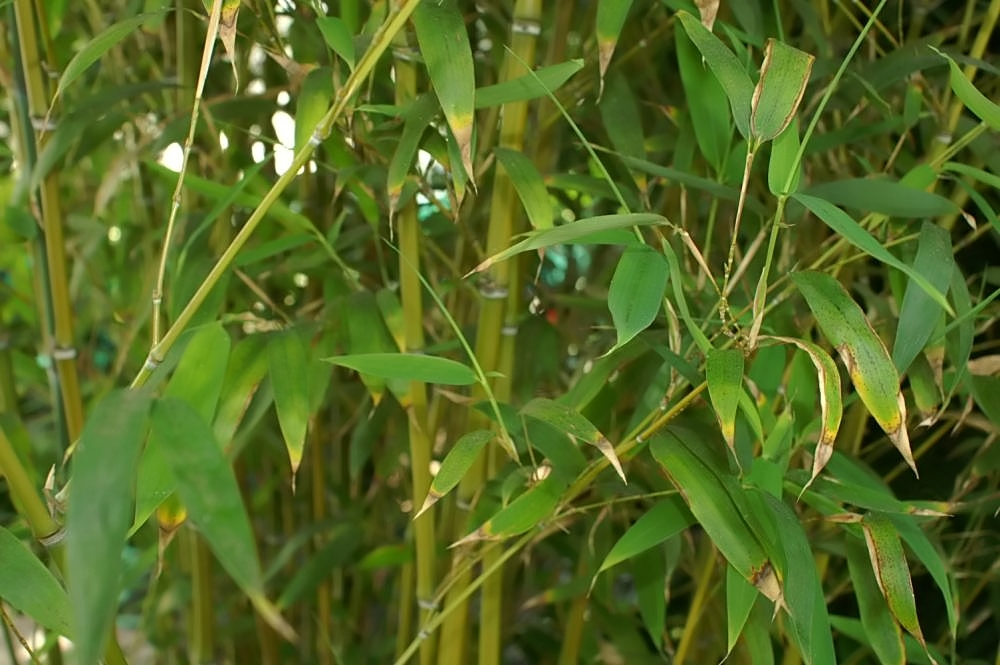

Scientific classification
- Kingdom: Plantae
- Clade: Tracheophytes
- Clade: Angiosperms
- Clade: Monocots
- Clade: Commelinids
- Order: Poales
- Family: Poaceae
- Genus: Phyllostachys
- Species: P. dulcis

Binomial name
- Phyllostachys dulcis McClure

= Phyllostachys dulcis =

Species of grass

Phyllostachys dulcis is a species of bamboo in the family Poaceae. It is native to Fujian, Jiangsu, Zhejiang provinces of China. This species is cultivated for its edible shoots.
