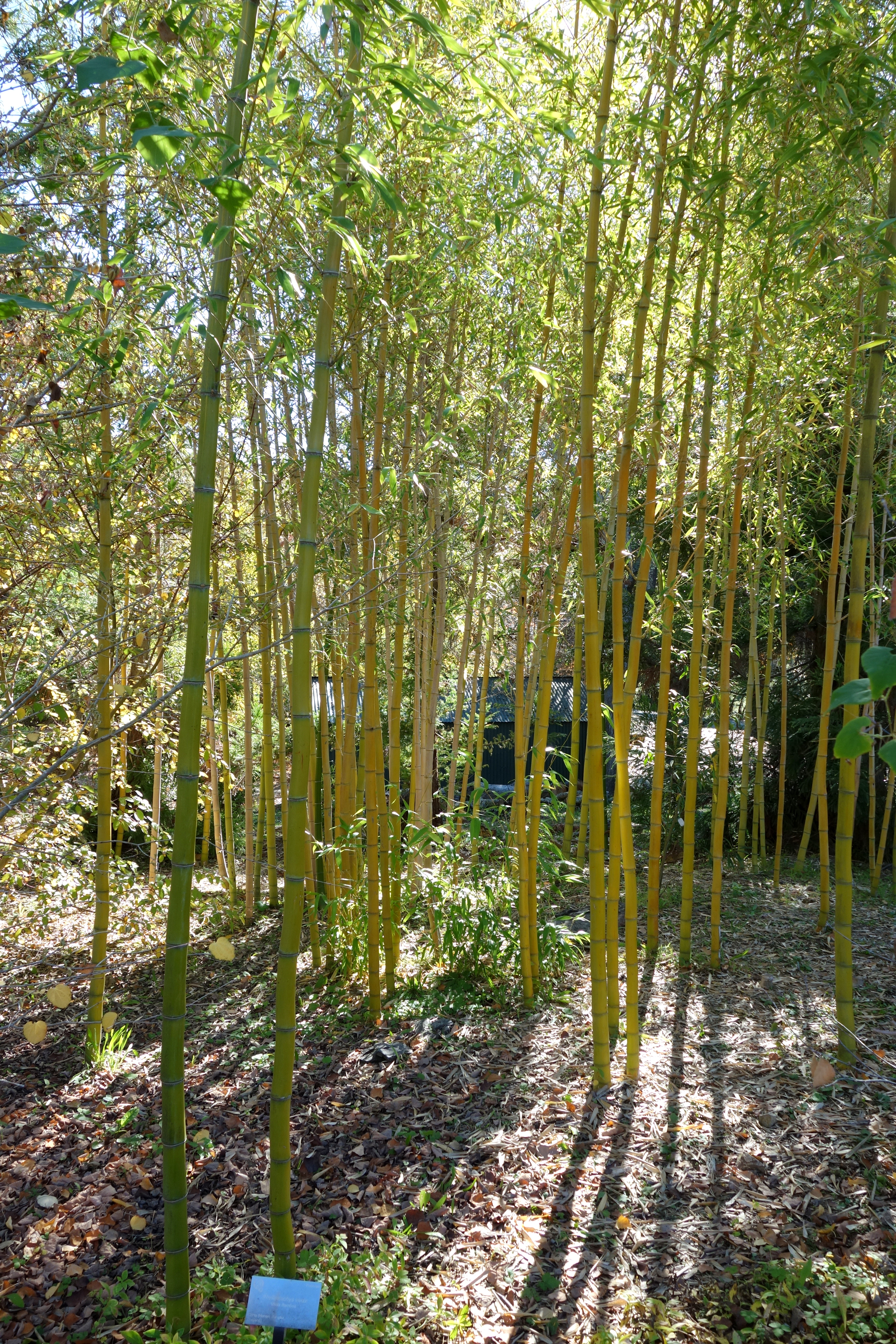

Scientific classification
- Kingdom: Plantae
- Clade: Embryophytes
- Clade: Tracheophytes
- Clade: Spermatophytes
- Clade: Angiosperms
- Clade: Monocots
- Clade: Commelinids
- Order: Poales
- Family: Poaceae
- Genus: Phyllostachys
- Species: P. vivax

Binomial name
- Phyllostachys vivax McClure

Synonyms
- Heterotypic Synonyms: Phyllostachys vivax f. aureocaulis N.X.Ma; Phyllostachys vivax f. huanguenzhu S.Y.Wang; Phyllostachys vivax f. viridivittata P.X.Zhang & G.H.Lai; Phyllostachys vivax f. vittata T.H.Wen

= Phyllostachys vivax =

Species of grass

Phyllostachys vivax, the Chinese timber bamboo, is a species of flowering plant in the bamboo subfamily of the grass family Poaceae, native to China.

It is a tall, robust evergreen plant growing quickly to 8 m (26 ft) or more, with strong green canes to 12 cm (4.7 in) in diameter, and topped by drooping leaves. Sources vary as to the maximum size, with one source quoting 21 m (69 ft). Mature canes turn yellow.

Initially forming clumps, the plants will eventually establish large thickets via underground running rhizomes, unless artificially restricted. The form P. vivax f. aureocaulis from eastern China is frequently found in cultivation, and has more vivid yellow canes striped with green. It is suitable for parks or large gardens, and is hardy down to at least −15 °C (5 °F). It has been given the Royal Horticultural Society's Award of Garden Merit.

The Latin specific epithet vivax means "long-lived".

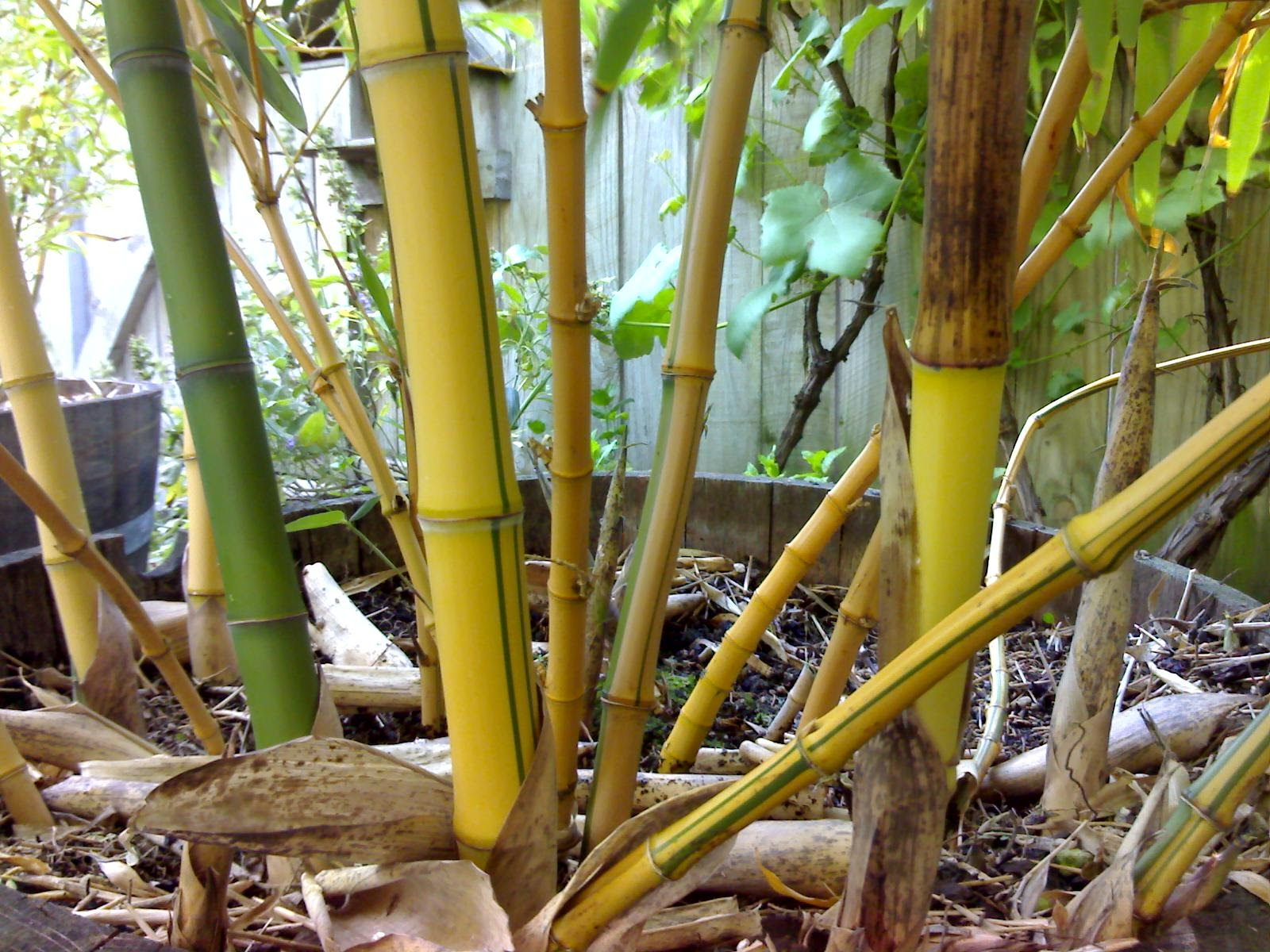
Phyllostachys vivax f. aureocaulis - variety of culm colour
