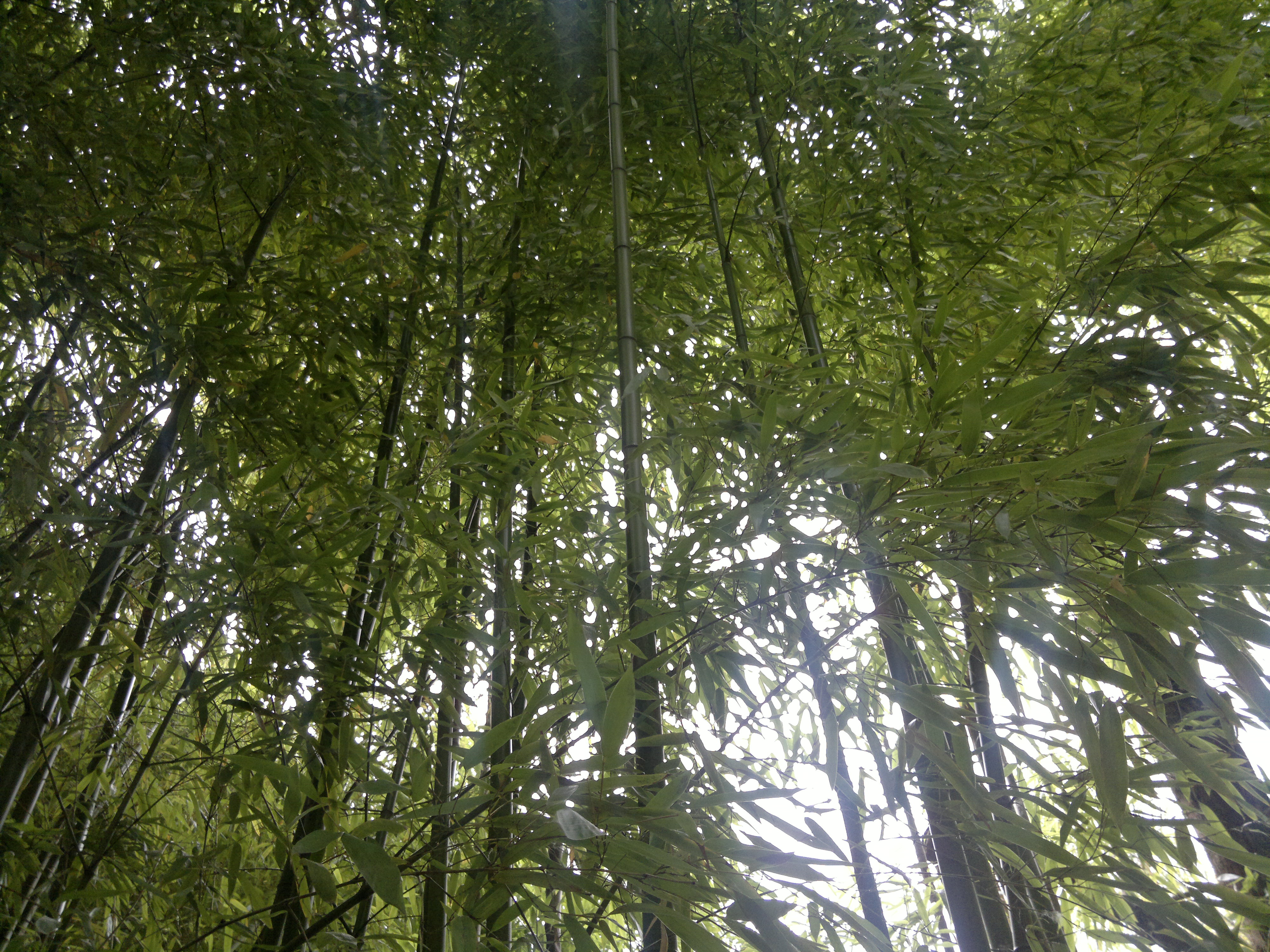

Scientific classification
- Kingdom: Plantae
- Clade: Tracheophytes
- Clade: Angiosperms
- Clade: Monocots
- Clade: Commelinids
- Order: Poales
- Family: Poaceae
- Genus: Phyllostachys
- Species: P. viridiglaucescens

Binomial name
- Phyllostachys viridiglaucescens (Carrière) Rivière & C. Rivière 1878

Synonyms
- Bambusa viridiglaucescens Carrière, Rev. Hort. 146. 1861 ["viridi-glaucescens"]: 146. 1861; Phyllostachys altiligulata G. G. Tang & Y. L. Xu; Phyllostachys nigrivagina T. H. Wen.

= Phyllostachys viridiglaucescens =

Species of grass

Phyllostachys viridiglaucescens is a species of bamboo found in Fujian, Jiangsu, Jiangxi, Zhejiang provinces of China.
