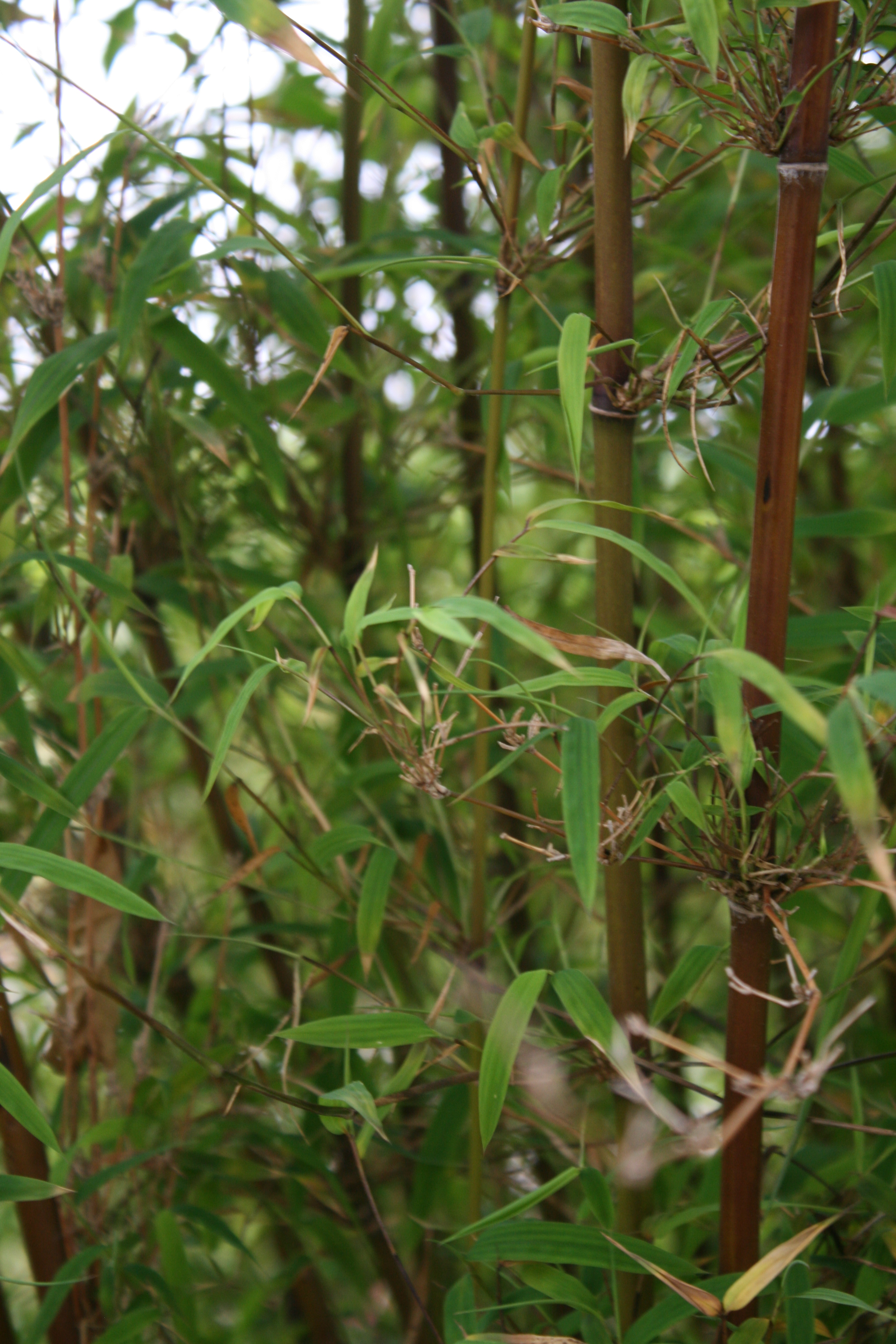

Scientific classification
- Kingdom: Plantae
- Clade: Tracheophytes
- Clade: Angiosperms
- Clade: Monocots
- Clade: Commelinids
- Order: Poales
- Family: Poaceae
- Genus: Himalayacalamus
- Species: H. asper

Binomial name
- Himalayacalamus asper Stapleton

= Himalayacalamus asper =

Species of grass

Himalayacalamus asper is a species of flowering plant in the family Poaceae found in Nepal. also called Malingo nigalo in common language.
