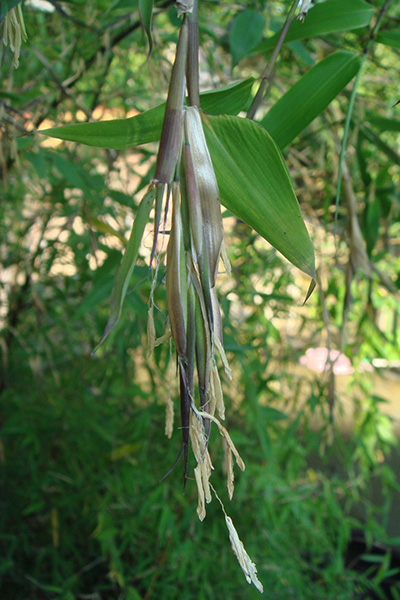
- Phyllostachys glauca 'Yunzhu' in flower

Scientific classification
- Kingdom: Plantae
- Clade: Tracheophytes
- Clade: Angiosperms
- Clade: Monocots
- Clade: Commelinids
- Order: Poales
- Family: Poaceae
- Genus: Phyllostachys
- Species: P. glauca

Binomial name
- Phyllostachys glauca McClure

Synonyms
- Heterotypic Synonyms: Phyllostachys glauca var. variabilis J.L.Lu; Phyllostachys glauca f. yuozhu J.L.Lu

= Phyllostachys glauca =

Species of grass

Phyllostachys glauca is a species of bamboo in the family Poaceae. It is native to Anhui, Henan, Hunan, Jiangsu, Shaanxi, Shandong, Shanxi, Yunnan, Zhejiang provinces of China.
