= Phyllostachys heteroclada =

Scientific classification
- Kingdom: Plantae
- Clade: Tracheophytes
- Clade: Angiosperms
- Clade: Monocots
- Clade: Commelinids
- Order: Poales
- Family: Poaceae
- Genus: Phyllostachys
- Species: P. heteroclada

Binomial name
- Phyllostachys heteroclada Oliv.

Species of grass

Phyllostachys heteroclada, the fishscale bamboo, also known as "water bamboo", is a running bamboo. The water bamboo name comes from the air canals in the rhizomes and roots that allow this bamboo to grow in more saturated conditions as compared to similar species. This species can also have abrupt kinks at the base of the culms. Maximum height can reach 35 ft with a diameter of 2 in. It is cold hardy to around -5 °F. It grows well in USDA zones 6b-10.

In 2019, a fungus Podonectria sichuanensis C.L. Yang & X.L. Xu (Podonectriaceae family) was found parasitic around the ascomata of another fungus Neostagonosporella sichuanensis C.L. Yang, X.L. Xu & K.D. Hyde (in the Phaeosphaeriaceae family) while found on Phyllostachys heteroclada, located in Sichuan Province in China.

== Other sources ==
- "Phyllostachys heteroclada Oliv.". Germplasm Resources Information Network. Agricultural Research Service, United States Department of Agriculture.
- "Phyllostachys heteroclada Oliv". Tropicos.org. Missouri Botanical Garden.
