= Auguste Rivière =

Auguste Rivière (8 January 1821 in Grenoble – 14 April 1877 in Paris) was a French horticulturalist and pomologist.

Born "Marie Auguste Rivière" into a family of horticulturalists, in 1859 he was appointed head gardener of the Jardin du Luxembourg in Paris. From 1868 he was a senior manager at the Jardin du Hamma, located near Algiers. Rivière's specialities included orchids, fruit trees, roses and vineyards.

== Selected publications ==
- Observations sur la fécondation et la germination des orchidées, à l'occasion d'un loelia hybride présenté en fleurs, le 24 août 1865, par M. Aug. Rivière, 1866 - Observations on the fecundation and germination of orchids.
- Les Fougères, 1867 (with other authors) - treatise on ferns.
- Catalogue des végétaux et graines disponibles et mis en vente au Jardin d'essai (au Hamma, près Alger, Algérie), 1869 - Catalog of plants and seeds available and ready for sale at the Jardin du Hamma.
- Le Jardin du Hamma et la Société générale algérienne, 1872.
- Les bambous : végétation, culture, multiplication en Europe, en Algérie et généralement dans tout le bassin méditerranéen nord de l'Afrique, Maroc, Tunisie, Egypte, 1878 - treatise on bamboo.
