= Aulonemia =

- Aulonemia robusta

Scientific classification
- Kingdom: Plantae
- Clade: Tracheophytes
- Clade: Angiosperms
- Clade: Monocots
- Clade: Commelinids
- Order: Poales
- Family: Poaceae
- Subfamily: Bambusoideae
- Tribe: Bambuseae
- Subtribe: Arthrostylidiinae
- Genus: Aulonemia; Goudot

Type species
- Aulonemia queko Goudot

Synonyms
- Matudacalamus F.Maek.

Genus of grasses

Aulonemia is a genus of bamboo in the grass family. It is native to southern Mexico, Central America, and tropical South America.

== Species ==
43 species are accepted:

- Aulonemia amplissima (Nees) McClure
- Aulonemia aristulata (Döll) McClure
- Aulonemia bogotensis L.G.Clark, Londoño & M.Kobay.
- Aulonemia boliviana Renvoize
- Aulonemia bromoides Judz. & Shea
- Aulonemia chimantaensis Judz. & Davidse
- Aulonemia cincta P.L.Viana & Filg.
- Aulonemia cochabambensis Judz. & L.G.Clark
- Aulonemia david-smithii Judz. & Waas
- Aulonemia deflexa (N.E.Br.) McClure
- Aulonemia dinirensis Judz. & Riina
- Aulonemia fuentesii Judz. & Geisth.
- Aulonemia goyazensis (Hack.) McClure
- Aulonemia haenkei (Rupr.) McClure
- Aulonemia herzogiana (Henrard) McClure
- Aulonemia hirtula (Pilg.) McClure
- Aulonemia humillima (Pilg.) McClure
- Aulonemia insignis Judz. & L.D.Gibbons
- Aulonemia jauaensis Judz. & Davidse
- Aulonemia laxa (F.Maek.) McClure
- Aulonemia longiaristata L.G.Clark & Londoño
- Aulonemia longipedicellata Renvoize
- Aulonemia madidiensis Judz., D.C.Ziegler & Zueger
- Aulonemia nitida Judz.
- Aulonemia notata McClure ex Judz., L.G.Clark & Londoño
- Aulonemia parviflora (J.Presl) McClure
- Aulonemia patriae R.W.Pohl
- Aulonemia patula (Pilg.) McClure – syn. Aulonemia sodiroana (Hack.) McClure
- Aulonemia pumila L.G.Clark & Londoño
- Aulonemia purpurata (McClure) McClure
- Aulonemia queko Goudot
- Aulonemia robusta L.G.Clark & Londoño
- Aulonemia rubraligulata Judz. & Geisth.
- Aulonemia scripta Judz. & Wayda
- Aulonemia soderstromii P.L.Viana, Filg. & Judz.
- Aulonemia subpectinata (Kuntze) McClure
- Aulonemia tremula Renvoize
- Aulonemia trianae (Munro) McClure
- Aulonemia verrucosa Londoño, Judz. & L.G.Clark
- Aulonemia viscosa (Hitchc.) McClure
- Aulonemia xerophylla P.L.Viana & Filg.
- Aulonemia ximenae L.G.Clark, Judz. & C.D.Tyrrell
- Aulonemia yanachagensis Judz. & C.D.Tyrrell

=== Formerly included ===
see Colanthelia Olmeca

- Aulonemia cingulata McClure & L.B.Sm. = Colanthelia cingulata (McClure & L.B.Sm.) McClure
- Aulonemia clarkiae Davidse & R.W.Pohl = Olmeca clarkiae (Davidse & R.W.Pohl) Ruiz-Sanchez, Sosa & Mejía-Saulés
- Aulonemia effusa (Hack.) McClure = Vianaea effusa (Hack.) C.D.Tyrrell, L.G.Clark, Santos-Gonç. & Afonso
- Aulonemia fimbriatifolia L.G.Clark = Quixiume radiata (Rupr.) C.D.Tyrrell, L.G.Clark, P.L.Viana & Santos-Gonç.
- Aulonemia fulgor Soderstr. = Olmeca fulgor (Soderstr.) Ruiz-Sanchez, Sosa & Mejía-Saulés
- Aulonemia glaziovii (Hack.) McClure = Quixiume radiata (Rupr.) C.D.Tyrrell, L.G.Clark, P.L.Viana & Santos-Gonç.
- Aulonemia intermedia McClure & L.B.Sm. = Colanthelia intermedia (McClure & L.B.Sm.) McClure
- Aulonemia lanciflora McClure & L.B.Sm. = Colanthelia lanciflora (McClure & L.B.Sm.) McClure
- Aulonemia radiata (Rupr.) McClure & L.B.Sm. = Quixiume radiata (Rupr.) C.D.Tyrrell, L.G.Clark, P.L.Viana & Santos-Gonç.
- Aulonemia ramosissima (Hack.) McClure = Quixiume radiata (Rupr.) C.D.Tyrrell, L.G.Clark, P.L.Viana & Santos-Gonç.
- Aulonemia setigera (Hack.) McClure = Stelanemia setigera (Hack.) C.D.Tyrrell, L.G.Clark, P.L.Viana & Santos-Gonç.
- Aulonemia ulei (Hack.) McClure & L.B.Sm. = Cambajuva ulei (Hack.) P.L.Viana, L.G.Clark & Filg.

== See also ==
- List of Poaceae genera
