= Aulonemia goyazensis =

Scientific classification
- Kingdom: Plantae
- Clade: Tracheophytes
- Clade: Angiosperms
- Clade: Monocots
- Clade: Commelinids
- Order: Poales
- Family: Poaceae
- Genus: Aulonemia
- Species: A. goyazensis

Binomial name
- Aulonemia goyazensis (Hack.) McClure

Synonyms
- Arundinaria goyazensis Hack.

Species of grass

Aulonemia goyazensis is a species of flowering plant in the family Poaceae. It is a bamboo endemic to Rio de Janeiro state in southeastern Brazil.

The species was first described as Arundinaria goyazensis by Eduard Hackel in 1903. In 1973 Floyd Alonzo McClure placed the species in genus Aulonemia as A. goyazensis.
