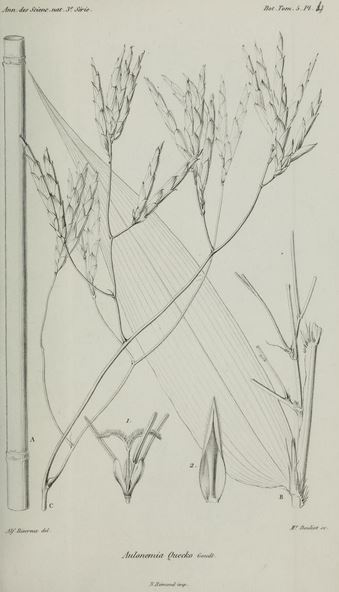

Scientific classification
- Kingdom: Plantae
- Clade: Tracheophytes
- Clade: Angiosperms
- Clade: Monocots
- Clade: Commelinids
- Order: Poales
- Family: Poaceae
- Genus: Aulonemia
- Species: A. queko

Binomial name
- Aulonemia queko Goudot

Synonyms
- Arthrostylidium queko (Goudot) Hack.; Arundinaria queko (Goudot) Hack.

= Aulonemia queko =

Species of grass

Aulonemia queko is a species of flowering plant in the family Poaceae. It is a bamboo native to Colombia, Ecuador, and Peru.

The species was first described by Justin Goudot in 1846.
