= Stelanemia setigera =

Scientific classification
- Kingdom: Plantae
- Clade: Tracheophytes
- Clade: Angiosperms
- Clade: Monocots
- Clade: Commelinids
- Order: Poales
- Family: Poaceae
- Genus: Stelanemia
- Species: S. setigera

Binomial name
- Stelanemia setigera (Hack.) C.D.Tyrrell, L.G.Clark, P.L.Viana & Santos-Gonç.

Synonyms
- Arthrostylidium aristatum Glaz. ex E.G.Camus; Arundinaria setigera Hack. (1903) (basionym); Aulonemia setigera (Hack.) McClure

Species of grass

Stelanemia setigera is a species of flowering plant of the family Poaceae. It is a bamboo native to Bahia and Rio de Janeiro states in eastern Brazil.

The species was first described as Arundinaria setigera by Eduard Hackel in 1903. In 1973 Floyd Alonzo McClure placed it in genus Aulonemia as A. setigera. In 2024 Christopher D. Tyrrell, Lynn G. Clark, Pedro Lage Viana, and Ana Paula Santos-Gonçalves placed the species in the newly-described genus Stelanemia as S. setigera.
