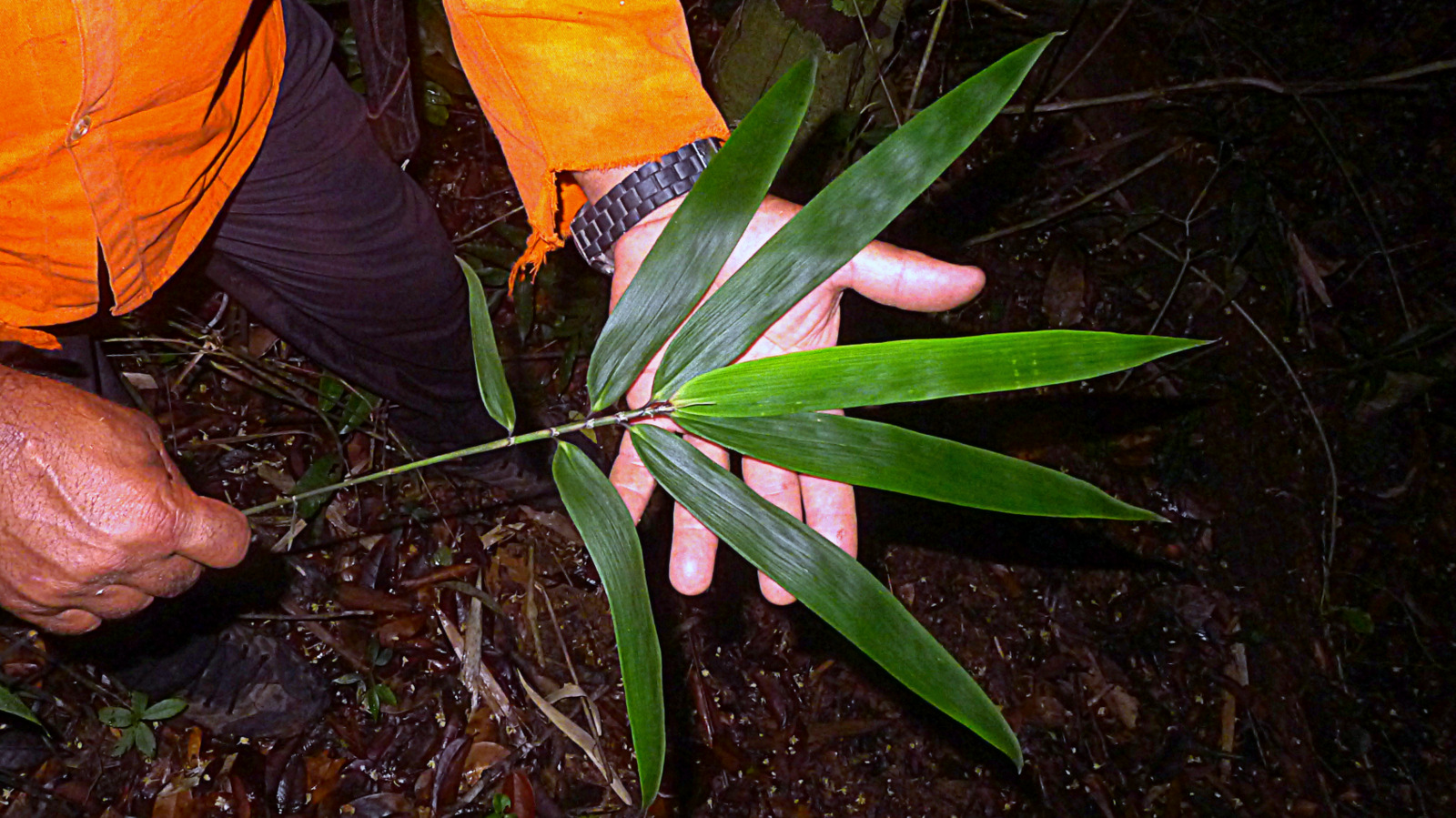
- Merostachys procerrima

Scientific classification
- Kingdom: Plantae
- Clade: Tracheophytes
- Clade: Angiosperms
- Clade: Monocots
- Clade: Commelinids
- Order: Poales
- Family: Poaceae
- Subfamily: Bambusoideae
- Tribe: Bambuseae
- Subtribe: Arthrostylidiinae
- Genus: Merostachys; Spreng. 1824 not Nakai 1935 (Crassulaceae)

Type species
- Merostachys speciosa Spreng.

Synonyms
- Brasilocalamus Nakai

= Merostachys =

Genus of grasses

Merostachys is a Neotropical genus of bamboo in the grass family. It is found in South America and Central America from Belize to Paraguay.

== Species ==
59 species are accepted.

- Merostachys abadiana Send.
- Merostachys annulifera Send.
- Merostachys argentea Send.
- Merostachys argyronema Lindm.
- Merostachys bifurcata Send.
- Merostachys brevigluma Send.
- Merostachys brevispica Munro
- Merostachys burmanii Send.
- Merostachys cachimboensis Lopes-Neto & P.L.Viana
- Merostachys calderoniana Send.
- Merostachys caucaiana Send.
- Merostachys ciliata McClure & L.B.Sm.
- Merostachys claussenii Munro
- Merostachys delicatula R.S.Andrade, Pianiss., Vinic.-Silva & R.P.Oliveira
- Merostachys espessae Vinic.-Silva, L.G.Clark & Santos-Gonç.
- Merostachys exserta Munro
- Merostachys filgueirasii Send.
- Merostachys fimbriata Send.
- Merostachys fimbriolaminata Vinic.-Silva, Cupert.-Eisenl. & Santos-Gonç.
- Merostachys fischeriana Rupr. ex Döll
- Merostachys fistulosa Döll
- Merostachys glauca McClure & L.B.Sm.
- Merostachys judziewiczii Vinic.-Silva, L.G.Clark & Santos-Gonç.
- Merostachys kleinii Send.
- Merostachys kunthii Rupr.
- Merostachys lage-vianae Vinic.-Silva, L.G.Clark & Santos-Gonç.
- Merostachys lanata Send.
- Merostachys latifolia R.W.Pohl
- Merostachys leptophylla Send.
- Merostachys magellanica Send.
- Merostachys magnispicula Send.
- Merostachys maguireorum McClure
- Merostachys medullosa Send.
- Merostachys mexicana Ruiz-Sanchez & L.G.Clark
- Merostachys multiramea Hack.
- Merostachys neesii Rupr.
- Merostachys nigricans I.Jiménez & Viníc.-Silva
- Merostachys pauciflora Swallen
- Merostachys petiolata Döll
- Merostachys pilifera Send.
- Merostachys pluriflora Munro ex E.G.Camus
- Merostachys polyantha McClure
- Merostachys ramosa Pianiss., Vinic.-Silva & L.G.Clark
- Merostachys procerrima Send.
- Merostachys ramosissima Send.
- Merostachys retrorsa McClure
- Merostachys riedeliana Rupr. ex Döll
- Merostachys rondoniensis Send.
- Merostachys scandens Send.
- Merostachys sellovii Munro
- Merostachys skvortzovii Send.
- Merostachys soderstromii Vinic.-Silva, L.G.Clark & Santos-Gonç.
- Merostachys sparsiflora Rupr.
- Merostachys speciosa Spreng.
- Merostachys tatianae Santos-Gonç., Carv.-Okano & Filg.
- Merostachys ternata Nees
- Merostachys vestita McClure & L.B.Sm.
- Merostachys ximenae Pianiss., Vinic.-Silva & L.G.Clark
- Merostachys yungasensis Lizarazu

Formerly included

see Athroostachys Rhipidocladum

- Merostachys capitata - Athroostachys capitata
- Merostachys racemiflora - Rhipidocladum racemiflorum
