= Aulonemia parviflora =

Scientific classification
- Kingdom: Plantae
- Clade: Tracheophytes
- Clade: Angiosperms
- Clade: Monocots
- Clade: Commelinids
- Order: Poales
- Family: Poaceae
- Genus: Aulonemia
- Species: A. parviflora

Binomial name
- Aulonemia parviflora (J.Presl) McClure

Synonyms
- Arthrostylidium maculatum Rupr.; Arundinaria maculata Hack.; Bambusa parviflora Schult.f.; Guadua parviflora J.Presl (1830) (basionym)

Species of grass

Aulonemia parviflora is a species of flowering plant in the family Poaceae. It is a bamboo endemic to Peru.

The species was first described as Guadua parviflora by Jan Svatopluk Presl in 1830. In 1973 Floyd Alonzo McClure placed the species in genus Aulonemia as A. parviflora.
