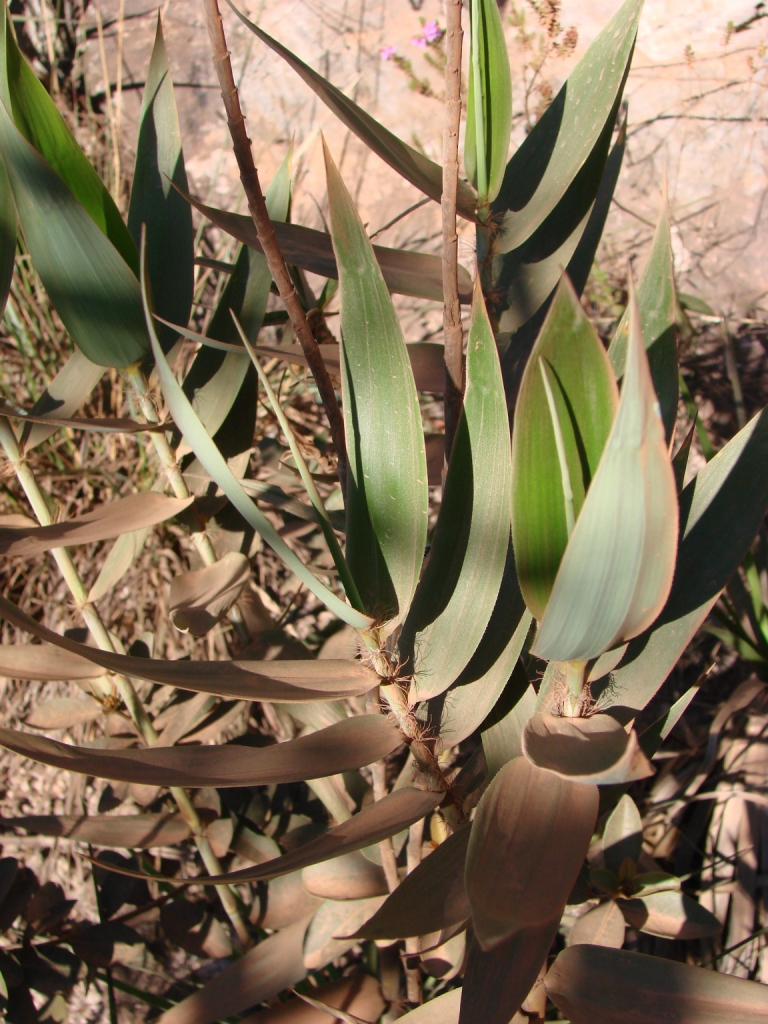

Scientific classification
- Kingdom: Plantae
- Clade: Tracheophytes
- Clade: Angiosperms
- Clade: Monocots
- Clade: Commelinids
- Order: Poales
- Family: Poaceae
- Genus: Vianaea; C.D.Tyrrell, L.G.Clark, Santos-Gonç. & Afonso
- Species: V. effusa

Binomial name
- Vianaea effusa (Hack.) C.D.Tyrrell, L.G.Clark, Santos-Gonç.

Synonyms
- Arthrostylidium effusum (Hack.) McClure; Arundinaria effusa Hack. (1903); Aulonemia effusa (Hack.) McClure

= Vianaea =

Species of grass

Vianaea is a genus of flowering plants in the family Poaceae. It includes a single species, Vianaea effusa, a bamboo endemic to eastern Brazil. It is common in open, rocky fields in the Serra do Espinhaço of Bahia and Minas Gerais states from 900 to 1550 meters elevation, and on quartzite formations in the Quadrilátero Ferrífero of Minas Gerais.

The species was first described as Arundinaria effusa by Eduard Hackel in 1903. In 1973 Floyd Alonzo McClure placed the species in genus Aulonemia as Aulonemia effusa. A phylogenetic analysis published by Jesus-Costa et al. concluded that Aulonemia was paraphyletic, and the authors placed the species in the newly-described monotypic genus Vianaea as V. effusa. The genus name Vianaea honors the Brazilian botanist Pedro Lage Viana, an authority on Brazilian Aulonemia who lived his early life in Minas Gerais state, in which type species primarily grows.
