= Aulonemia haenkei =

Scientific classification
- Kingdom: Plantae
- Clade: Tracheophytes
- Clade: Angiosperms
- Clade: Monocots
- Clade: Commelinids
- Order: Poales
- Family: Poaceae
- Genus: Aulonemia
- Species: A. haenkei

Binomial name
- Aulonemia haenkei (Rupr.) McClure

Synonyms
- Arthrostylidium haenkei Rupr.; Arundinaria haenkei (Rupr.) Hack.; Arundinaria setifera Pilg.

Species of grass

Aulonemia haenkei is a species of flowering plant in the family Poaceae. It is a bamboo native to Ecuador and Peru.

The species was first described as Arthrostylidium haenkei by Franz Josef Ruprecht in 1839. In 1973 Floyd Alonzo McClure placed the species in genus Aulonemia as A. haenkei.

== Description ==
Aulonemia haenkei has 3 lodicules, 3 stamen, and 2 stigmas. It is perennial and caespitose with short Rhizomes, making it a pachymorph. Its culms erect, allowing the plant to grow up to heights of 150–200 cm long, due to its woody s tem.
