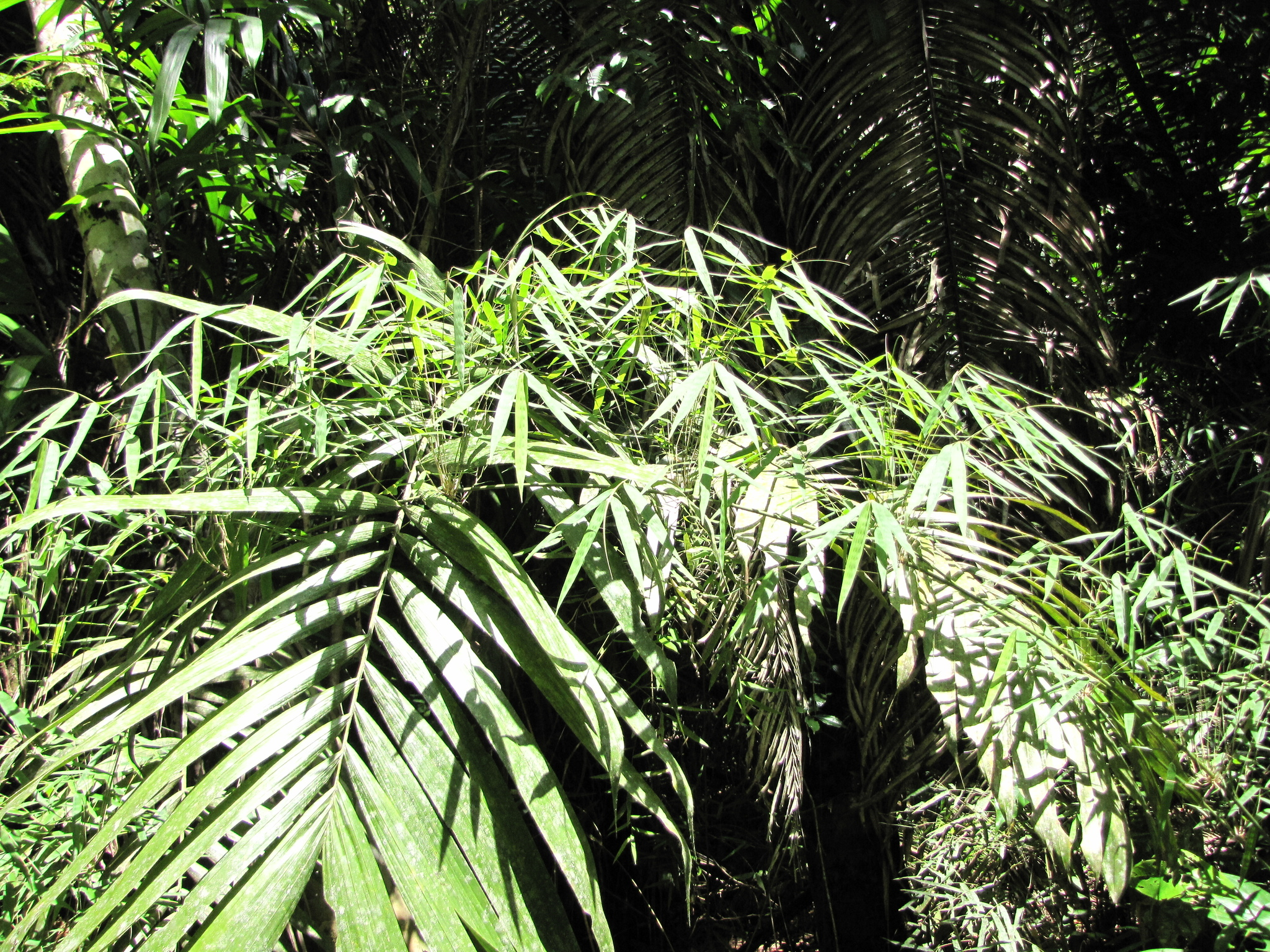
- Rhipidocladum bartlettii

Scientific classification
- Kingdom: Plantae
- Clade: Tracheophytes
- Clade: Angiosperms
- Clade: Monocots
- Clade: Commelinids
- Order: Poales
- Family: Poaceae
- Subfamily: Bambusoideae
- Tribe: Bambuseae
- Subtribe: Arthrostylidiinae
- Genus: Rhipidocladum; McClure

Type species
- Rhipidocladum harmonicum (Parodi) McClure

= Rhipidocladum =

Genus of grasses

Rhipidocladum is a genus of New World woody bamboo in the grass family. It is found in Mesoamerica, Trinidad, and South America. The genus is characterized by having erect, non-pseudopetiolate culm leaves, numerous branchlets arising in an aspidate (fan-like) array, and by having true caryopses as fruit. The name is derived from the Greek rhipid meaning "fanlike" and clad meaning "branch".

== Species ==
22 species are accepted.

- Rhipidocladum abregoense Londoño & L.G.Clark – Colombia (Norte de Santander)
- Rhipidocladum ampliflorum (McClure) McClure – Venezuela
- Rhipidocladum angustiflorum (Stapf) McClure – Colombia, Venezuela
- Rhipidocladum arenicola C.D.Tyrrell & L.G.Clark – Peru
- Rhipidocladum barbinode Ruiz-Sanchez, C.D.Tyrrell & Vigosa – Mexico (Nayarit to Guerrero)
- Rhipidocladum bartlettii (McClure) McClure – Mexico (Chiapas, Yucatán Peninsula), Belize, Guatemala, Honduras
- Rhipidocladum clarkiae R.W.Pohl – Costa Rica
- Rhipidocladum cordatum C.D.Tyrrell & L.G.Clark – Ecuador
- Rhipidocladum harmonicum (Parodi) McClure – from southern Mexico to Bolivia
- Rhipidocladum martinezii Davidse & R.W.Pohl – Mexico (Chiapas)
- Rhipidocladum maxonii (Hitchc.) McClure – Costa Rica, Guyana
- Rhipidocladum neumannii Sulekic, Rúgolo & L.G.Clark – Argentina (Salta, Tucumán), Bolivia (La Paz, Santa Cruz, Tarija)
- Rhipidocladum pacuarense R.W.Pohl – Nicaragua, Costa Rica
- Rhipidocladum panamense R.W.Pohl – Panamá
- Rhipidocladum parviflorum (Trin.) McClure – Venezuela, Colombia, Perú, Bolivia, Brazil, Panamá
- Rhipidocladum pittieri (Hack.) McClure – from Mexico (Michoacán) to Panamá
- Rhipidocladum prestoei (Munro) McClure – Trinidad
- Rhipidocladum racemiflorum (Steud.) McClure – Mexico from Tucumán to Tamaulipas
- Rhipidocladum rubrofimbriatum C.D.Tyrrell, L.G.Clark & Judz. – Venezuela
- Rhipidocladum sibilans Davidse, Judz. & L.G.Clark – Venezuela, Guyana
- Rhipidocladum singuliflorum Ruiz-Sanchez & C.D.Tyrrell – Mexico (Jalisco)
- Rhipidocladum zoqueorum Ruiz-Sanchez, C.D.Tyrrell & Sosa – Mexico (Chiapas)

=== Formerly included ===
See Actinocladum and Didymogonyx

- Rhipidocladum geminatum = Didymogonyx geminatum
- Rhipidocladum longispiculatum = Didymogonyx longispiculatum
- Rhipidocladum verticillatum = Actinocladum verticillatum
