= Aulonemia patriae =

Scientific classification
- Kingdom: Plantae
- Clade: Tracheophytes
- Clade: Angiosperms
- Clade: Monocots
- Clade: Commelinids
- Order: Poales
- Family: Poaceae
- Genus: Aulonemia
- Species: A. patriae

Binomial name
- Aulonemia patriae R.W.Pohl

Species of grass

Aulonemia patriae is a species of flowering plant in the family Poaceae. It is a bamboo native to Costa Rica and Panama.
