= N. nana =

N. nana may refer to:

- Neurolepis nana, a grass species found only in Ecuador
- Nycteris nana, the dwarf slit-faced bat, a bat species living in forest and savanna regions of Central Africa

== See also ==
- Nana (disambiguation)
