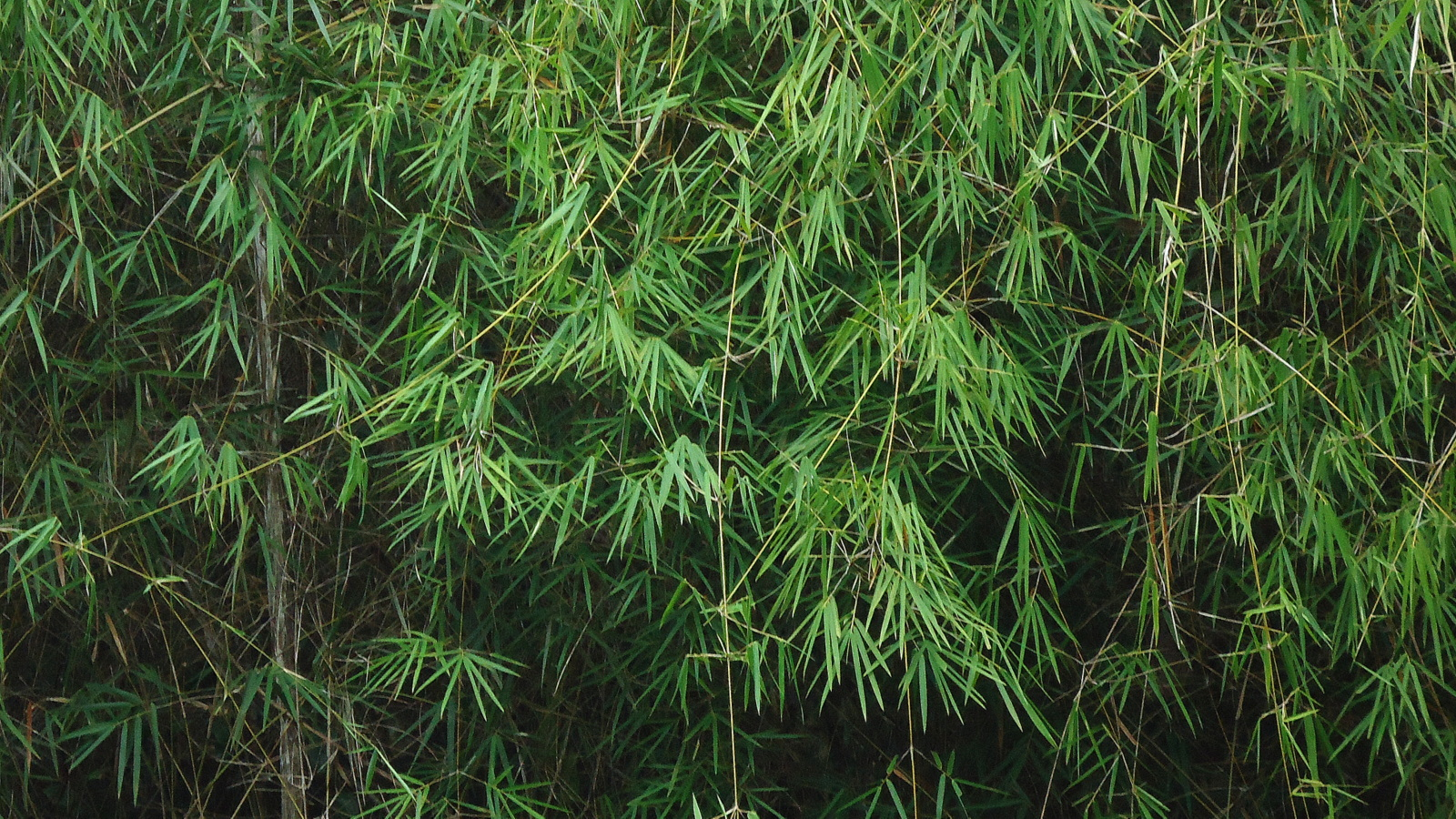
- Atractantha falcata

Scientific classification
- Kingdom: Plantae
- Clade: Embryophytes
- Clade: Tracheophytes
- Clade: Spermatophytes
- Clade: Angiosperms
- Clade: Monocots
- Clade: Commelinids
- Order: Poales
- Family: Poaceae
- Subfamily: Bambusoideae
- Tribe: Bambuseae
- Subtribe: Arthrostylidiinae
- Genus: Atractantha; McClure

Type species
- Atractantha radiata McClure

= Atractantha =

Genus of grasses

Atractantha is a South American genus of bamboo in the grass family, native to Brazil, Colombia, and Venezuela.

Species

1. Atractantha amazonica Judz. & L.G.Clark - Amazonas in Brazil, Amazonas in Venezuela, Vaupés in Colombia
2. Atractantha aureolanata Judz. - Espírito Santo, Bahia
3. Atractantha cardinalis Judz. - Bahia
4. Atractantha falcata McClure - Bahia
5. Atractantha radiata McClure - Bahia

Formerly included

1. Atractantha shepherdiana – Athroostachys shepherdiana

== See also ==
- List of Poaceae genera
