= Chusquea asymmetrica =

Conservation status
- Vulnerable (IUCN 3.1)

Scientific classification
- Kingdom: Plantae
- Clade: Tracheophytes
- Clade: Angiosperms
- Clade: Monocots
- Clade: Commelinids
- Order: Poales
- Family: Poaceae
- Genus: Chusquea
- Species: C. asymmetrica

Binomial name
- Chusquea asymmetrica (L.G.Clark) L.G.Clark

Synonyms
- Neurolepis asymmetrica L.G.Clark

Species of grass

Chusquea asymmetrica is a species of grass in the family Poaceae. It is found only in Ecuador.

== Conservation status ==
Chusquea asymmetrica is recorded to be vulnerable to becoming an endangered species. Six subpopulations are known to be found in Ecuador. These subpopulations are common to Parque Nacional Podocarpus. It has also been recorded that this species can be found in Bolivia.
