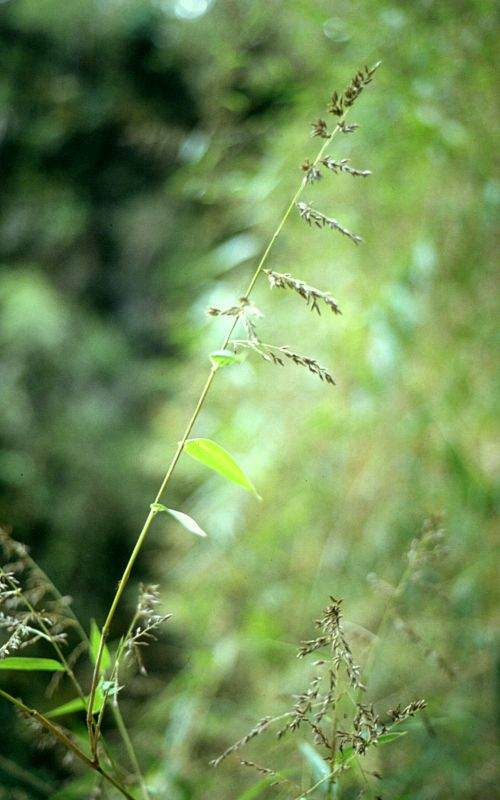
- Chusquea quila

Scientific classification
- Kingdom: Plantae
- Clade: Tracheophytes
- Clade: Angiosperms
- Clade: Monocots
- Clade: Commelinids
- Order: Poales
- Family: Poaceae
- Clade: BOP clade
- Subfamily: Bambusoideae
- Tribe: Bambuseae
- Subtribe: Chusqueinae
- Genus: Chusquea; Kunth

Type species
- Chusquea scandens Kunth

Synonyms
- Rettbergia Raddi; Platonia Kunth, 1829, rejected homonym not Mart. 1832 (Clusiaceae) nor Raf. 1808 (Verbenaceae) nor Raf. 1810 (Cistaceae); Dendragrostis Nees; Neurolepis Meisn.; Coliquea Steud. ex Bibra; Planotia Munro; Swallenochloa McClure

= Chusquea =

Genus of grasses

Chusquea is a genus of evergreen bamboos in the grass family. Most of them are native to mountain habitats in Latin America, from Mexico to southern Chile and Argentina.

They are sometimes referred to as South American mountain bamboos. Unlike most other grasses, the stems of these species are solid, not hollow. Some animals are, to various extents, associated with stands of Chusquea, for example the Inca wren, monito del monte, and the plushcap.

== Notable species ==
Chusquea culeou, the Chilean feather bamboo or colihue cane, from southern Chile and adjacent western Argentina, is notable as the most frost-tolerant South American bamboo and the only one that has been grown successfully to any extent in the temperate Northern Hemisphere, with successful growth as an ornamental plant north to Scotland. The colihue cane was used by the Mapuche Indians to make instruments and as lances during the War of Arauco.

Chusquea quila (in Spanish quila), in contrast to Colihue, has a spreading or vining growth. It prefers wet places and does not grow above 500 metres (1,600 ft), where C. culeou becomes more dominant. Chusquea quila can form pure stands called quilantales. Very few plants can grow under this species.

Chusquea elata is notable for its very large leaves; longer than the height of the plant.

In Chile, Chusquea species have been historically harvested for seed by indigenous peoples, but the flowering and seeds of the species, is associated to mice vermin.

== Taxonomy ==
The genus Chusquea now includes species formerly classified in Dendragrostis, Rettbergia, Swallenochloa, and Neurolepis. The genus has been organized into three subgenera, subg. Rettbergia, subg. Swallenochloa and subg. Chusquea, although molecular evidence only supports a monophyletic subg. Rettbergia.

== Species ==
193 species are accepted:

1. Chusquea abietifolia – Caribbean
2. Chusquea acuminata – Brazil (Rio de Janeiro state)
3. Chusquea acuminatissima – Colombia and Venezuela
4. Chusquea albilanata – Colombia and Ecuador
5. Chusquea amistadensis – Costa Rica and Panama
6. Chusquea andina – central and southern Chile
7. Chusquea anelythra – eastern Brazil
8. Chusquea anelythroides – southeastern Brazil
9. Chusquea angusta – Colombia, Venezuela, and Guyana
10. Chusquea angustifolia – eastern Colombia to western Venezuela
11. Chusquea annagardneriae – Ecuador
12. Chusquea antioquensis – central Colombia
13. Chusquea aperta – Mexico (Veracruz and Oaxaca)
14. Chusquea arachniformis – north-central Colombia
15. Chusquea argentina – south-central and southern Chile to southwestern Argentina
16. Chusquea aristata – southwest Colombia to Peru
17. Chusquea aspera – Peru
18. Chusquea asymmetrica – Ecuador, Peru, and Bolivia
19. Chusquea attenuata – Brazil (Minas Gerais state)
20. Chusquea aurea – Venezuela
21. Chusquea baculifera – southeastern Brazil
22. Chusquea bahiana – eastern Brazil
23. Chusquea bambusoides – eastern and southern Brazil
24. Chusquea barbata – Peru
25. Chusquea bilimekii – Mexico (Mexico and Veracruz states)
26. Chusquea bradei – Brazil (Bahia and Espirito Santo states)
27. Chusquea caparaoensis – Brazil (Minas Gerais state)
28. Chusquea capitata – southeastern and southern Brazil
29. Chusquea capituliflora – southeastern and southern Brazil
30. Chusquea ciliata – central Chile
31. Chusquea ciliatifolia – Brazil (southeastern Bahia and northeastern Minas Gerais states)
32. Chusquea circinata – Mexico (Sinaloa to Chiapas states)
33. Chusquea clarkiae – Colombia
34. Chusquea clemirae – Brazil (Bahia state)
35. Chusquea contrerasii – Mexico (Jalisco)
36. Chusquea coronalis – Mexico (Chiapas) to Costa Rica
37. Chusquea cortesii – central and southern Mexico and Guatemala
38. Chusquea costaricensis – Costa Rica
39. Chusquea culeou – central and southern Chile, southwestern Argentina
40. Chusquea cumingii – central Chile
41. Chusquea cylindrica – Trinidad
42. Chusquea decolorata – Peru
43. Chusquea deficiens – central Bolivia to northwestern Argentina
44. Chusquea deflexa – El Salvador and Honduras
45. Chusquea delicatula – Peru and Bolivia
46. Chusquea depauperata – Peru and Bolivia
47. Chusquea diversiglumis – Venezuela and northern Brazil
48. Chusquea dombeyana – Colombia, Ecuador, and Peru
49. Chusquea egluma – Argentina (Salta Province)
50. Chusquea elata – southern Ecuador
51. Chusquea enigmatica – Mexico (San Luis Potosí and Veracruz states)
52. Chusquea erecta – Brazil (São Paulo state)
53. Chusquea exasperata – Ecuador and Peru
54. Chusquea falcata – Ecuador
55. Chusquea fasciculata – Brazil (Minas Gerais)
56. Chusquea fendleri – Venezuela
57. Chusquea fernandeziana – Juan Fernandez Islands and central Chile
58. Chusquea fimbriligulata – Colombia, Ecuador, and Peru
59. Chusquea floribunda – southern Bolivia and northwestern Argentina (Jujuy and Salta provinces)
60. Chusquea foliosa – Costa Rica and Panama
61. Chusquea fruticosa – Brazil (Minas Gerais state)
62. Chusquea galeottiana – Mexico (Guerrero and Oaxaca states)
63. Chusquea gamarrae – Peru
64. Chusquea gibcooperi – Mexico (Hidalgo, Veracruz, and Puebla states)
65. Chusquea gigantea – Chile (La Araucania)
66. Chusquea glauca – Mexico (Veracruz state)
67. Chusquea glomerata – Colombia and Venezuela
68. Chusquea gouveiensis – Brazil (Minas Gerais state)
69. Chusquea gracilis – Brazil (Santa Catarina state)
70. Chusquea grandiflora – Panama and Colombia
71. Chusquea guirigayensis – northwestern Valencia
72. Chusquea guzmanii – Mexico (Jalisco state)
73. Chusquea hatschbachii – Brazil (Santa Catarina state)
74. Chusquea heterophylla – southeastern Brazil
75. Chusquea huantensis – Peru
76. Chusquea ibiramae – southeastern Brazil
77. Chusquea imbricata – Brazil (Minas Gerais state)
78. Chusquea inamoena – Peru
79. Chusquea intipaqariy – Peru
80. Chusquea jorgemoranii – Ecuador
81. Chusquea juergensii – southeastern and southern Brazil, Argentina (Misiones province)
82. Chusquea kleinii – Brazil (Santa Catarina)
83. Chusquea kochii Ruiz-Sanchez, Mejía-Saulés & L.G.Clark - Southwest Mexico
84. Chusquea laegaardii – Ecuador and Bolivia
85. Chusquea lanceolata – Mexico (Chiapas state) to Honduras
86. Chusquea latifolia – Colombia
87. Chusquea lehmannii – Colombia and Ecuador
88. Chusquea leonardiorum – Ecuador
89. Chusquea leptophylla – southeastern and southern Brazil
90. Chusquea liebmannii – western Mexico to Costa Rica
91. Chusquea ligulata – Colombia
92. Chusquea limensis – Peru
93. Chusquea linearis – Venezuela, Guyana, northern Brazil
94. Chusquea londoniae – Colombia and Ecuador
95. Chusquea longifolia – Mexico (Chiapas state) and Guatemala
96. Chusquea longiligulata – Costa Rica
97. Chusquea longipedicellata – Peru
98. Chusquea longipendula – Bolivia (Cochabamba)
99. Chusquea longiprophylla – Colombia
100. Chusquea longispiculata – Brazil (São Paulo and Rio de Janeiro states)
101. Chusquea lorentziana – Bolivia and northwestern Argentina
102. Chusquea loxensis – Ecuador
103. Chusquea maclurei – Ecuador
104. Chusquea macrostachya – southern Chile
105. Chusquea maculata – Colombia and Venezuela
106. Chusquea magnifolia – Costa Rica, Panama, Venezuela, and northern Brazil
107. Chusquea matlatzinca – Mexico (Michoacán state)
108. Chusquea mayrae – Costa Rica
109. Chusquea meyeriana – southeastern and southern Brazil
110. Chusquea microphylla – Brazil (Rio de Janeiro and Minas Gerais states)
111. Chusquea mimosa – southern Brazil
112. Chusquea mirabilis – Brazil (Bahia state)
113. Chusquea mollis – Colombia and Venezuela
114. Chusquea montana – central and southern Chile to southwestern Argentina
115. Chusquea montisylvicola – Ecuador (Loja)
116. Chusquea mulleri – Mexico (Veracruz state)
117. Chusquea multiramea – Venezuela
118. Chusquea nana – Ecuador
119. Chusquea nedjaquithii – Mexico (Oaxaca state)
120. Chusquea nelsonii – Mexico (Michoacán and Guerrero states)
121. Chusquea neurophylla – Ecuador and Peru
122. Chusquea nobilis – Colombia and Ecuador
123. Chusquea nudiramea – Brazil (Santa Catarina state)
124. Chusquea nutans – Brazil (Bahia and Minas Gerais states)
125. Chusquea oligophylla – southeastern and southern Brazil
126. Chusquea ovatifolia – Bolivia
127. Chusquea oxylepis – eastern and southern Brazil
128. Chusquea pallida – northeastern Colombia to northern Venezuela
129. Chusquea paludicola – Costa Rica
130. Chusquea parodii – Bolivia
131. Chusquea parviligulata – Brazil (Bahia state)
132. Chusquea patens – Costa Rica and Panama
133. Chusquea paucispiculata – Peru and Bolivia
134. Chusquea perligulata – Ecuador
135. Chusquea perotensis – Mexico (Veracruz and Oaxaca states)
136. Chusquea peruviana – southern Peru to Bolivia
137. Chusquea petiolata – Colombia
138. Chusquea picta – Peru and Bolivia
139. Chusquea pinifolia – southeastern Brazil
140. Chusquea pittieri – Mexico (Chiapas state) to Panama
141. Chusquea pohlii – Cosa Rica and Panama
142. Chusquea polyclados – Peru
143. Chusquea pulchella – Brazil (Rio de Janeiro and São Paulo states)
144. Chusquea purdieana – Colombia and Venezuela
145. Chusquea quila – central and southern Chile
146. Chusquea ramosissima – Bolivia, Paraguay, eastern and southern Brazil, northern Uruguay, and northeastern Argentina
147. Chusquea renvoizei – Bolivia
148. Chusquea repens – Mexico (Chiapas and Oaxaca states)
149. Chusquea rigida – Ecuador
150. Chusquea riosaltensis – Brazil (Minas Gerais state)
151. Chusquea rugoloana – Peru
152. Chusquea scabra – Costa Rica and Panama
153. Chusquea scandens – Colombia, Ecuador, Peru, and Bolivia
154. Chusquea sclerophylla – Brazil (Serra do Órgãos of Rio de Janeiro state)
155. Chusquea sellowii – southeastern and southern Brazil
156. Chusquea septentrionalis – Mexico (Durango state)
157. Chusquea serpens – Costa Rica to Venezuela and Ecuador
158. Chusquea serrulata – Colombia and Ecuador
159. Chusquea silverstonei – northwestern Colombia
160. Chusquea simpliciflora – Mexico (Chiapas) to Ecuador and Venezuela
161. Chusquea simplicissima – central Peru
162. Chusquea smithii – Peru
163. Chusquea sneidernii – Colombia
164. Chusquea spadicea – Colombia
165. Chusquea spathacea – Colombia
166. Chusquea spectabilis – Colombia, Venezuela, and Ecuador
167. Chusquea spencei – Colombia and northern Venezuela
168. Chusquea spicata – Bolivia and south-central and southeastern Peru
169. Chusquea straminea – northern Peru
170. Chusquea stuebelii – Colombia and Ecuador
171. Chusquea subtessellata – Costa Rica and Panama
172. Chusquea subtilis – Costa Rica
173. Chusquea subulata – Colombia and Ecuador
174. Chusquea sulcata – Mexico (Veracruz, Oaxaca, and Chiapas), Guatemala, and Costa Rica
175. Chusquea talamancensis – Costa Rica
176. Chusquea tarmensis – Peru
177. Chusquea tenella – southeastern and southern Brazil and northeastern Argentina
178. Chusquea tenuiglumis – southeastern Brazil
179. Chusquea tessellata – Colombia, Ecuador, and Venezuela
180. Chusquea tomentosa – Costa Rica
181. Chusquea tonduzii – Costa Rica
182. Chusquea tovarii – Ecuador and northwestern Peru
183. Chusquea tuberculosa – northeastern Colombia
184. Chusquea uliginosa – south-central and southern Chile
185. Chusquea uniflora – Colombia, Ecuador, and Peru
186. Chusquea urelytra – eastern and southern Brazil
187. Chusquea valdiviensis – south-central and southern Chile and southern Argentina
188. Chusquea villosa – Ecuador
189. Chusquea virgata – Costa Rica and Panama
190. Chusquea vulcanalis – Costa Rica and Panama
191. Chusquea weberbaueri – northern Peru
192. Chusquea wilkesii – Brazil (Rio de Janeiro state)
193. Chusquea windischii – Brazil (Santa Catarina state)
194. Chusquea yungasensis – Bolivia

== See also ==
- List of Poaceae genera
