= Aulonemia amplissima =

Scientific classification
- Kingdom: Plantae
- Clade: Tracheophytes
- Clade: Angiosperms
- Clade: Monocots
- Clade: Commelinids
- Order: Poales
- Family: Poaceae
- Genus: Aulonemia
- Species: A. amplissima

Binomial name
- Aulonemia amplissima (Nees) McClure

Synonyms
- Arthrostylidium amplissimum (Nees) McClure; Arundinaria amplissima Nees

Species of grass

Aulonemia amplissima is a species of flowering plant in the grass family (Poaceae). It is a bamboo native to southeastern and southern Brazil.

The species was first described as Arthrostylidium amplissimum by Christian Gottfried Daniel Nees von Esenbeck in 1835. In 1975 Floyd Alonzo McClure placed the species in genus Aulonemia as A. amplissima.
