= Aulonemia laxa =

Scientific classification
- Kingdom: Plantae
- Clade: Tracheophytes
- Clade: Angiosperms
- Clade: Monocots
- Clade: Commelinids
- Order: Poales
- Family: Poaceae
- Genus: Aulonemia
- Species: A. laxa

Binomial name
- Aulonemia laxa (F.Maek.) McClure

Synonyms
- Matudacalamus laxus F.Maek.

Species of grass

Aulonemia laxa is a species of flowering plant in the family Poaceae. It is a bamboo native to southern Mexico.

The species was first described as Matudacalamus laxus by Fumio Maekawa in 1961. In 1973 Floyd Alonzo McClure placed the species in genus Aulonemia as A. laxa.
