= Aulonemia aristulata =

Scientific classification
- Kingdom: Plantae
- Clade: Tracheophytes
- Clade: Angiosperms
- Clade: Monocots
- Clade: Commelinids
- Order: Poales
- Family: Poaceae
- Genus: Aulonemia
- Species: A. aristulata

Binomial name
- Aulonemia aristulata (Döll) McClure

Synonyms
- Arundinaria aristulata Döll (1880) (basionym); Arundinaria mucronata Munro ex E.G.Camus; Sieglingia aristulata (Döll) Kuntze

Species of grass

Aulonemia aristulata is a species of flowering plant in the grass family (Poaceae). It is a bamboo native to eastern, southern, and west-central Brazil.

The species was first described as Arundinaria aristulata by Johann Christoph Döll in 1880. In 1973 Floyd Alonzo McClure placed the species in genus Aulonemia as A. aristulata.
