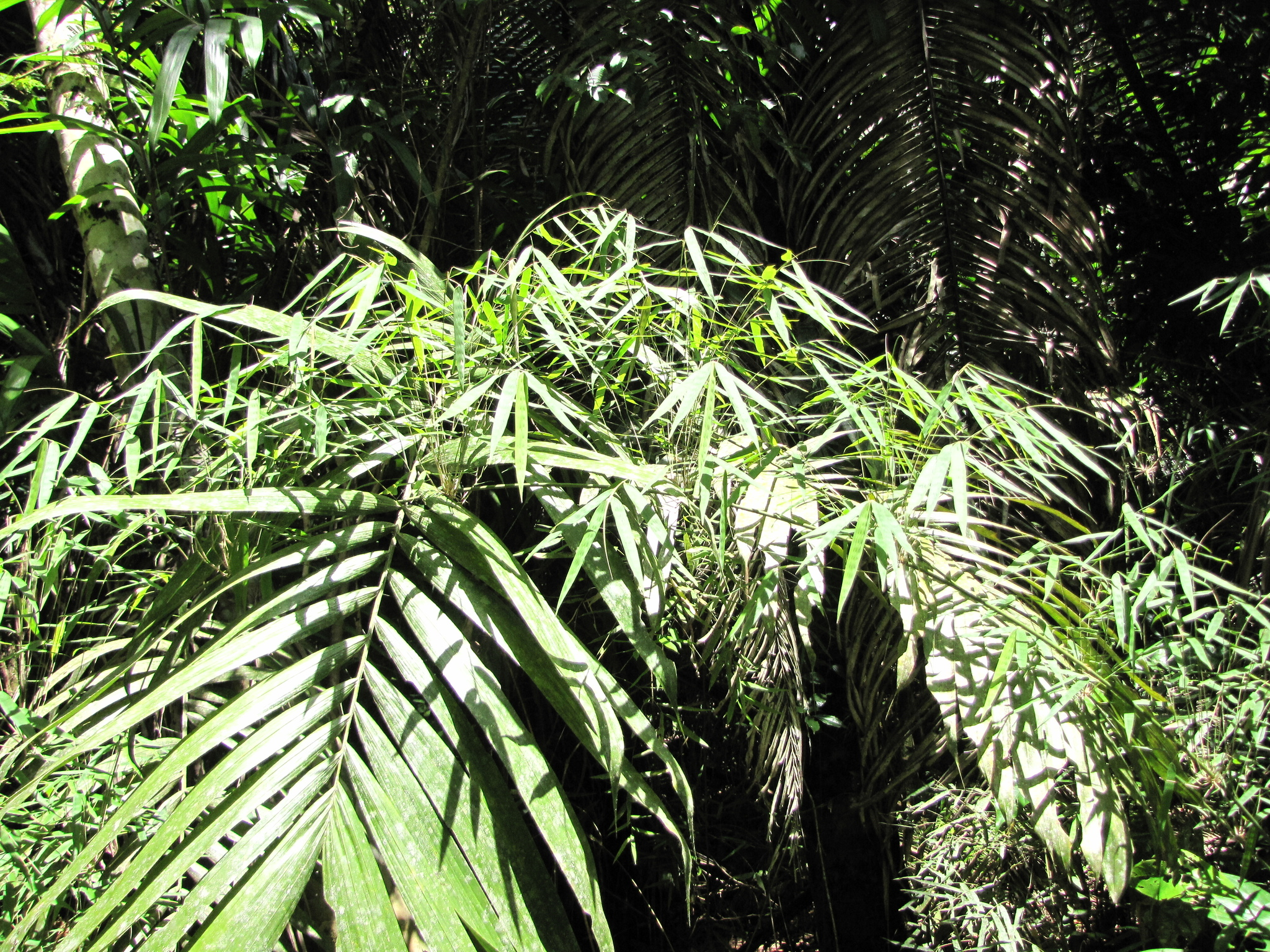
- Rhipidocladum bartlettii

Scientific classification
- Kingdom: Plantae
- Clade: Tracheophytes
- Clade: Angiosperms
- Clade: Monocots
- Clade: Commelinids
- Order: Poales
- Family: Poaceae
- Clade: BOP clade
- Subfamily: Bambusoideae
- Tribe: Bambuseae
- Subtribe: Arthrostylidiinae; Soderstr. & R.P.Ellis

Genera
- 19; see text

= Arthrostylidiinae =

Subtribe of grasses

Arthrostylidiinae is a subtribe of bamboo (tribe Bambuseae of the family Poaceae). It comprises 19 genera which grow in tropical regions.

- Actinocladum McClure ex Soderstr.
- Alvimia C.E.Calderón ex Soderstr. & Londoño
- Arthrostylidium Rupr.
- Athroostachys Benth.
- Atractantha McClure
- Aulonemia L.G.Clark, Londoño, C.D.Tyrrell & Judz.
- Cambajuva P.L.Viana, L.G.Clark & Filg.
- Colanthelia McClure & E.W.Sm.
- Didymogonyx (L.G.Clark & Londoño) C.D.Tyrrell, L.G.Clark & Londoño
- Elytrostachys McClure
- Filgueirasia Guala
- Glaziophyton Franch.
- Merostachys Spreng.
- Myriocladus Swallen
- Quixiume C.D.Tyrrell, L.G.Clark, P.L.Viana & Santos-Gonç.
- Rhipidocladum McClure
- Stelanemia C.D.Tyrrell, L.G.Clark, P.L.Viana & Santos-Gonç.
- Tibisia C.D.Tyrrell, Londoño & L.G.Clark
- Vianaea C.D.Tyrrell, L.G.Clark, Santos-Gonç. & Afonso
