= Aulonemia longiaristata =

Conservation status
- Near Threatened (IUCN 3.1)

Scientific classification
- Kingdom: Plantae
- Clade: Tracheophytes
- Clade: Angiosperms
- Clade: Monocots
- Clade: Commelinids
- Order: Poales
- Family: Poaceae
- Genus: Aulonemia
- Species: A. longiaristata

Binomial name
- Aulonemia longiaristata L.G.Clark & Londoño

Species of grass

Aulonemia longiaristata is a species of bamboo in the family Poaceae. It is found only in Ecuador.
