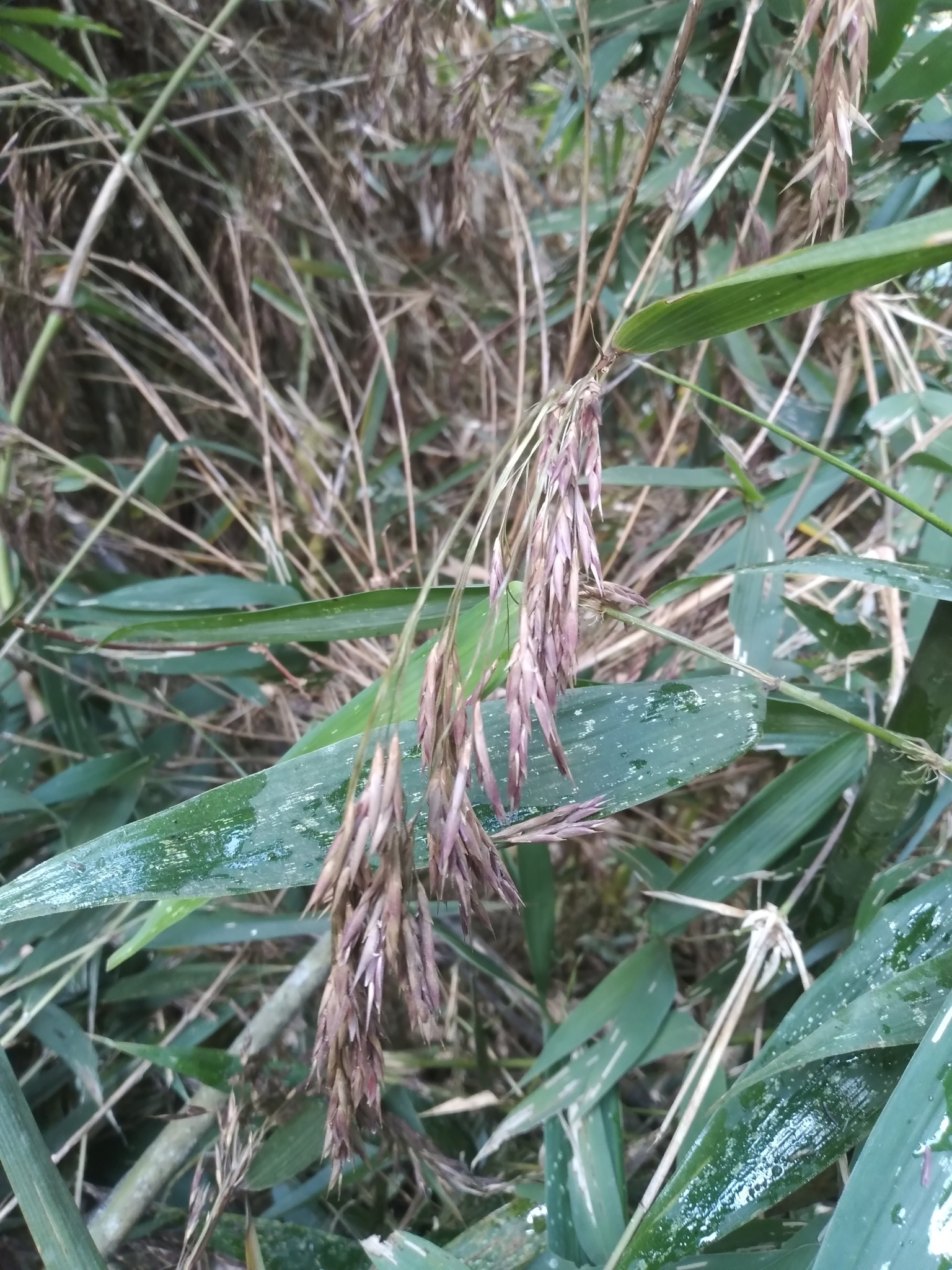

Scientific classification
- Kingdom: Plantae
- Clade: Tracheophytes
- Clade: Angiosperms
- Clade: Monocots
- Clade: Commelinids
- Order: Poales
- Family: Poaceae
- Genus: Aulonemia
- Species: A. hirtula

Binomial name
- Aulonemia hirtula (Pilg.) McClure

Synonyms
- Arundinaria hirtula Pilg.

= Aulonemia hirtula =

Species of grass

Aulonemia hirtula is a species of flowering plant in the family Poaceae. It is a bamboo native to Ecuador, Peru, and Bolivia.

The species was first described as Arundinaria hirtula by Robert Knud Friedrich Pilger in 1921. In 1973 Floyd Alonzo McClure placed the species in genus Aulonemia as A. hirtula.
