= Aulonemia humillima =

Scientific classification
- Kingdom: Plantae
- Clade: Tracheophytes
- Clade: Angiosperms
- Clade: Monocots
- Clade: Commelinids
- Order: Poales
- Family: Poaceae
- Genus: Aulonemia
- Species: A. humillima

Binomial name
- Aulonemia humillima (Pilg.) McClure

Synonyms
- Arundinaria humillima Pilg.

Species of grass

Aulonemia humillima is a species of flowering plant in the family Poaceae. It is a bamboo endemic to Peru.

The species was first described as Arundinaria humillima by Robert Knud Friedrich Pilger in 1905. In 1973 Floyd Alonzo McClure placed the species in genus Aulonemia as A. humillima.
