= Aulonemia patula =

Scientific classification
- Kingdom: Plantae
- Clade: Tracheophytes
- Clade: Angiosperms
- Clade: Monocots
- Clade: Commelinids
- Order: Poales
- Family: Poaceae
- Genus: Aulonemia
- Species: A. patula

Binomial name
- Aulonemia patula (Pilg.) McClure

Synonyms
- Arundinaria patula Pilg. (1898) (basionym); Arundinaria sodiroana Hack.; Aulonemia sodiroana (Hack.) McClure

Species of grass

Aulonemia patula is a species of bamboo in the genus Aulonemia. It is native to Colombia, Ecuador, and Peru.

The species was first described as Arundinaria patula by Robert Knud Friedrich Pilger in 1898. In 1973 Floyd Alonzo McClure placed the species in genus Aulonemia as A. patula.
