= Aulonemia herzogiana =

Scientific classification
- Kingdom: Plantae
- Clade: Tracheophytes
- Clade: Angiosperms
- Clade: Monocots
- Clade: Commelinids
- Order: Poales
- Family: Poaceae
- Genus: Aulonemia
- Species: A. herzogiana

Binomial name
- Aulonemia herzogiana (Henrard) McClure

Synonyms
- Arundinaria herzogiana Henrard

Species of grass

Aulonemia herzogiana is a species of flowering plant in the family Poaceae. It is a bamboo endemic to Bolivia.

The species was first described as Arundinaria herzogiana by Johannes Theodoor Henrard in 1921. In 1973 Floyd Alonzo McClure placed the species in genus Aulonemia as A. herzogiana.
