= Aulonemia subpectinata =

Scientific classification
- Kingdom: Plantae
- Clade: Tracheophytes
- Clade: Angiosperms
- Clade: Monocots
- Clade: Commelinids
- Order: Poales
- Family: Poaceae
- Genus: Aulonemia
- Species: A. subpectinata

Binomial name
- Aulonemia subpectinata (Kuntze) McClure

Synonyms
- Arthrostylidium subpectinatum Kuntze

Species of grass

Aulonemia subpectinata is a species of flowering plant in the family Poaceae. It is a bamboo native to Colombia and Venezuela.

The species was first described as Arthrostylidium subpectinatum by Otto Kuntze in 1891. In 1973 Floyd Alonzo McClure placed the species in genus Aulonemia as A. subpectinata.
