= Aulonemia trianae =

Scientific classification
- Kingdom: Plantae
- Clade: Tracheophytes
- Clade: Angiosperms
- Clade: Monocots
- Clade: Commelinids
- Order: Poales
- Family: Poaceae
- Genus: Aulonemia
- Species: A. trianae

Binomial name
- Aulonemia trianae (Munro) McClure

Synonyms
- Arundinaria multiflora Döll; Arundinaria trianae Munro

Species of grass

Aulonemia trianae is a species of flowering plant in the family Poaceae. It is a bamboo native to Colombia and Venezuela, where it grows from 2600 to 3200 meters elevation.

The species was first described as Arundinaria trianae by William Munro in 1868. In 1973 Floyd Alonzo McClure placed the species in genus Aulonemia as A. trianae.
