= Chusquea laegaardii =

Conservation status
- Vulnerable (IUCN 3.1)

Scientific classification
- Kingdom: Plantae
- Clade: Tracheophytes
- Clade: Angiosperms
- Clade: Monocots
- Clade: Commelinids
- Order: Poales
- Family: Poaceae
- Genus: Chusquea
- Species: C. laegaardii

Binomial name
- Chusquea laegaardii (L.G.Clark) L.G.Clark

Synonyms
- Neurolepis laegaardii L.G.Clark

Species of grass

Chusquea laegaardii is a species of grass in the family Poaceae. The bamboo is endemic to Ecuador. It is an IUCN Red List Vulnerable species.
