= Chusquea falcata =

Conservation status
- Vulnerable (IUCN 3.1)

Scientific classification
- Kingdom: Plantae
- Clade: Tracheophytes
- Clade: Angiosperms
- Clade: Monocots
- Clade: Commelinids
- Order: Poales
- Family: Poaceae
- Genus: Chusquea
- Species: C. falcata

Binomial name
- Chusquea falcata L.G.Clark

Species of grass

Chusquea falcata is a species of bamboo endemic to Ecuador.
