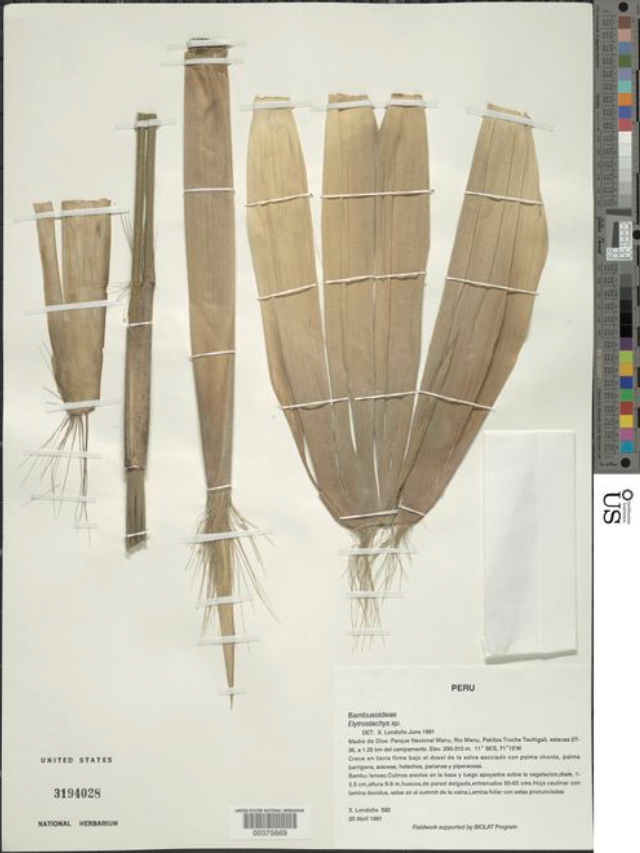

Scientific classification
- Kingdom: Plantae
- Clade: Embryophytes
- Clade: Tracheophytes
- Clade: Spermatophytes
- Clade: Angiosperms
- Clade: Monocots
- Clade: Commelinids
- Order: Poales
- Family: Poaceae
- Subfamily: Bambusoideae
- Tribe: Bambuseae
- Subtribe: Arthrostylidiinae
- Genus: Elytrostachys; McClure

Type species
- Elytrostachys typica McClure

= Elytrostachys =

Genus of grasses

Elytrostachys is a genus of bamboo (tribe Bambuseae of the family Poaceae), found in the rainforests from Honduras to Venezuela.

Species

1. Elytrostachys clavigera McClure – Costa Rica, Honduras, Nicaragua, Panama, Colombia
2. Elytrostachys typica McClure – Honduras, Colombia, Venezuela
