= Aulonemia viscosa =

Scientific classification
- Kingdom: Plantae
- Clade: Tracheophytes
- Clade: Angiosperms
- Clade: Monocots
- Clade: Commelinids
- Order: Poales
- Family: Poaceae
- Genus: Aulonemia
- Species: A. viscosa

Binomial name
- Aulonemia viscosa (Hitchc.) McClure

Synonyms
- Arundinaria viscosa Hitchc.

Species of grass

Aulonemia viscosa is a species of flowering plant in the family Poaceae. It is a bamboo native to Costa Rica and Venezuela.

The species was first described as Arundinaria viscosa by A. S. Hitchcock in 1927. In 1973 Floyd Alonzo McClure placed the species in genus Aulonemia as A. viscosa.
