= Aulonemia purpurata =

Scientific classification
- Kingdom: Plantae
- Clade: Tracheophytes
- Clade: Angiosperms
- Clade: Monocots
- Clade: Commelinids
- Order: Poales
- Family: Poaceae
- Genus: Aulonemia
- Species: A. purpurata

Binomial name
- Aulonemia purpurata (McClure) McClure

Synonyms
- Arthrostylidium purpuratum McClure

Species of grass

Aulonemia purpurata is a species of flowering in the family Poaceae. It is a bamboo endemic to Venezuela.

The species was first described as Arthrostylidium purpuratum by Floyd Alonzo McClure in 1942. In 1973 McClure placed the species in genus Aulonemia as A. purpurata.
