= Aulonemia deflexa =

Scientific classification
- Kingdom: Plantae
- Clade: Tracheophytes
- Clade: Angiosperms
- Clade: Monocots
- Clade: Commelinids
- Order: Poales
- Family: Poaceae
- Genus: Aulonemia
- Species: A. deflexa

Binomial name
- Aulonemia deflexa (N.E.Br.) McClure

Synonyms
- Arthrostylidium steyermarkii McClure; Arundinaria deflexa N.E.Br. (1901) (basionym); Aulonemia steyermarkii (McClure) McClure

Species of grass

Aulonemia deflexa is a species of flowering plant in the family Poaceae. It is a bamboo native to Guyana and northern Brazil.

The species was first described as Arundinaria deflexa by N. E. Brown in 1901. In 1973 Floyd Alonzo McClure placed the species in genus Aulonemia as A. deflexa.
