= Aulonemia madidiensis =

Scientific classification
- Kingdom: Plantae
- Clade: Tracheophytes
- Clade: Angiosperms
- Clade: Monocots
- Clade: Commelinids
- Order: Poales
- Family: Poaceae
- Genus: Aulonemia
- Species: A. madidiensis

Binomial name
- Aulonemia madidiensis Judz., D.C.Ziegler & Zueger

Species of grass

Aulonemia madidiensis is a species of flowering plant in the family Poaceae. It is a bamboo native to Bolivia and Peru.
