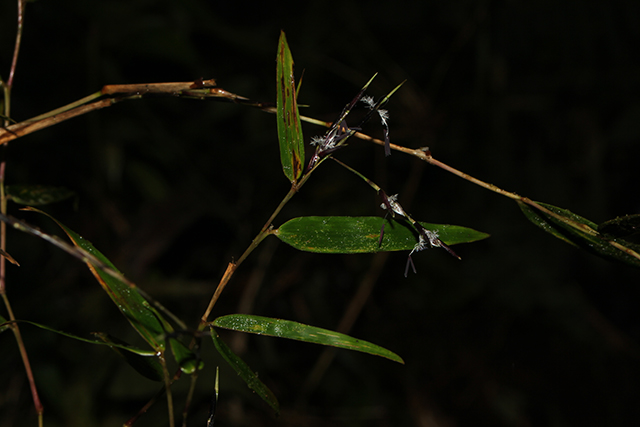

Scientific classification
- Kingdom: Plantae
- Clade: Tracheophytes
- Clade: Angiosperms
- Clade: Monocots
- Clade: Commelinids
- Order: Poales
- Family: Poaceae
- Genus: Aulonemia
- Species: A. pumila

Binomial name
- Aulonemia pumila L.G.Clark & Londoño

= Aulonemia pumila =

Species of grass

Aulonemia pumila is a species of flowering plant in the family Poaceae. It is a bamboo endemic to Colombia.
