= Myriocladus =

Scientific classification
- Kingdom: Plantae
- Clade: Tracheophytes
- Clade: Angiosperms
- Clade: Monocots
- Clade: Commelinids
- Order: Poales
- Family: Poaceae
- Subfamily: Bambusoideae
- Tribe: Bambuseae
- Subtribe: Arthrostylidiinae
- Genus: Myriocladus; Swallen

Type species
- Myriocladus virgatus Swallen

Genus of grasses

Myriocladus is a South American genus of bamboo in the grass family. It is found in the sandstone tablelands of Venezuela, Guyana, Suriname, and northern Brazil.

== Species ==
13 species are accepted.

- Myriocladus caburaiensis Alfonso & P.L.Viana
- Myriocladus cardonae Swallen
- Myriocladus churunensis Swallen
- Myriocladus distantiflorus Swallen
- Myriocladus exsertus Swallen
- Myriocladus grandifolius Swallen
- Myriocladus involutus Judz. & Davidse
- Myriocladus longiramosus Swallen
- Myriocladus neblinaensus Swallen
- Myriocladus paludicola Swallen
- Myriocladus simplex Swallen
- Myriocladus steyermarkii Swallen
- Myriocladus virgatus Swallen
