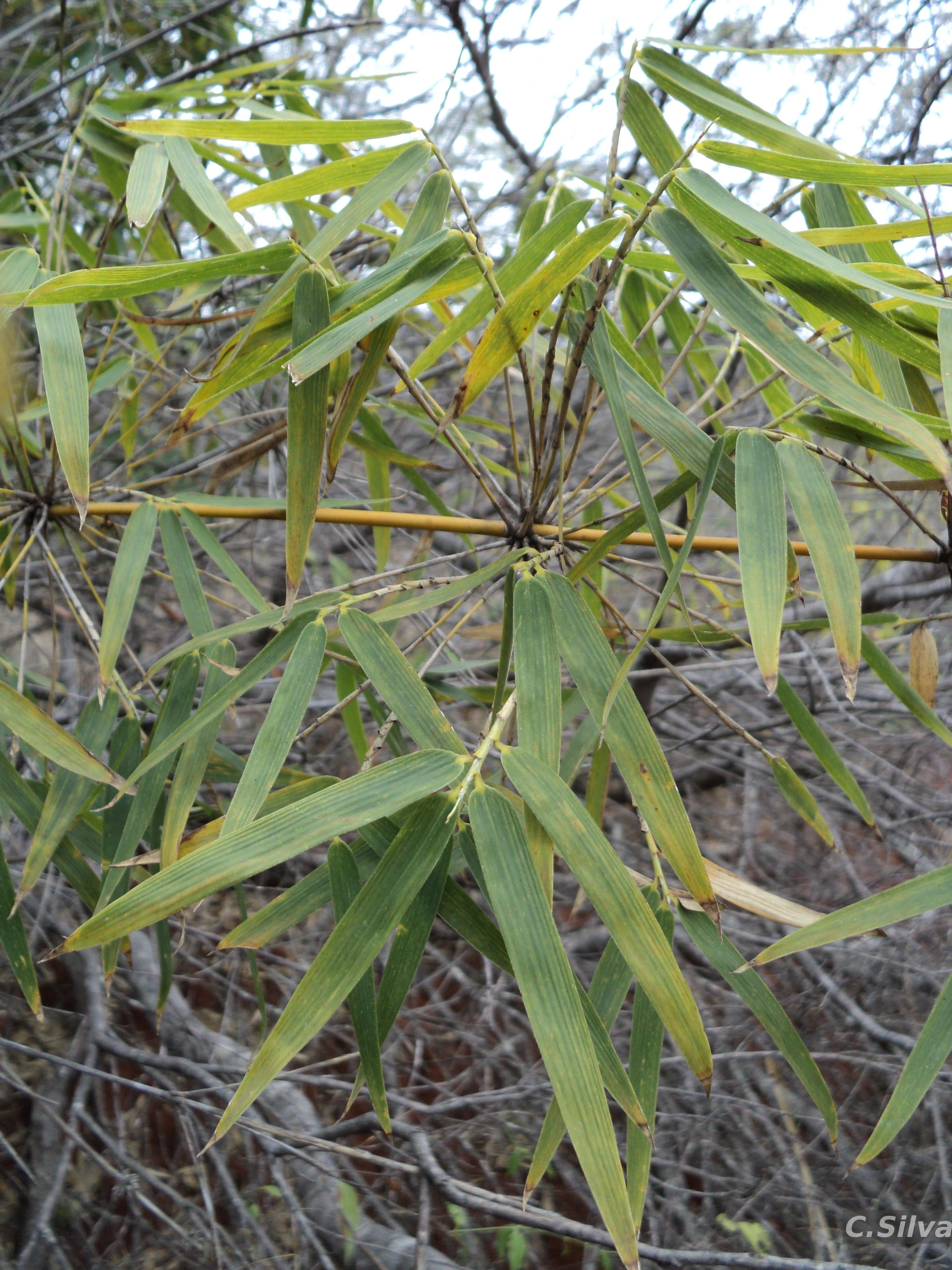

Scientific classification
- Kingdom: Plantae
- Clade: Tracheophytes
- Clade: Angiosperms
- Clade: Monocots
- Clade: Commelinids
- Order: Poales
- Family: Poaceae
- Subfamily: Bambusoideae
- Tribe: Bambuseae
- Subtribe: Arthrostylidiinae
- Genus: Actinocladum; McClure ex Soderstr.
- Species: A. verticillatum

Binomial name
- Actinocladum verticillatum (Nees) McClure ex Soderstr.

Synonyms
- Arundinaria verticillata Nees in C.F.P.von Martius; Ludolfia verticillata (Nees) A.Dietr.; Rhipidocladum verticillatum (Nees) McClure

= Actinocladum =

Genus of grasses

Actinocladum is a South American genus of bamboo in the grass family.

== Species ==
The only known species is Actinocladum verticillatum. The species is widespread across Bolivia and much of Brazil.

== See also ==
- List of Poaceae genera
