= Chusquea elata =

Conservation status
- Endangered (IUCN 3.1)

Scientific classification
- Kingdom: Plantae
- Clade: Tracheophytes
- Clade: Angiosperms
- Clade: Monocots
- Clade: Commelinids
- Order: Poales
- Family: Poaceae
- Genus: Chusquea
- Species: C. elata

Binomial name
- Chusquea elata (Kunth) L.G.Clark

Synonyms
- Neurolepis elata (Kunth) Pilg.; Planotia elata (Kunth) Munro; Platonia elata Kunth

Species of grass

Chusquea elata is a species of bamboo endemic to the cloud forests of Ecuador and Colombia. It is remarkable for its enormous leaves up to 5 m (16 ft) long and up to 50 cm (20 in) wide. This is a shrubby species only about 2 m (6 ft 7 in) tall.
