= Chusquea delicatula =

Scientific classification
- Kingdom: Plantae
- Clade: Tracheophytes
- Clade: Angiosperms
- Clade: Monocots
- Clade: Commelinids
- Order: Poales
- Family: Poaceae
- Genus: Chusquea
- Species: C. delicatula

Binomial name
- Chusquea delicatula Hitchc.

Species of plant

Chusquea delicatula is a South American bamboo found in the Andean mountains of Peru including the areas around Machu Picchu. It's a highly arching bamboo, so much so that its culms are thin and viney, and its tips often touch the ground. The branching from the nodes of its culms shoot out in all directions in a star-like formation. Mature height for the bamboo is around 3 meters length.
