= Glaziophyton =

Scientific classification
- Kingdom: Plantae
- Clade: Tracheophytes
- Clade: Angiosperms
- Clade: Monocots
- Clade: Commelinids
- Order: Poales
- Family: Poaceae
- Subfamily: Bambusoideae
- Tribe: Bambuseae
- Subtribe: Arthrostylidiinae
- Genus: Glaziophyton; Franch.
- Species: G. mirabile

Binomial name
- Glaziophyton mirabile Franch.

Synonyms
- Arundinaria mirabile (Franch.) Hack.

Genus of grasses

Glaziophyton is a Brazilian genus of bamboo in the grass family.

== Species ==
The only known species is Glaziophyton mirabile, native to the State of Rio de Janeiro in southeastern Brazil.
