= Aulonemia tremula =

Scientific classification
- Kingdom: Plantae
- Clade: Tracheophytes
- Clade: Angiosperms
- Clade: Monocots
- Clade: Commelinids
- Order: Poales
- Family: Poaceae
- Genus: Aulonemia
- Species: A. tremula

Binomial name
- Aulonemia tremula Renvoize

Species of grass

Aulonemia tremula is a species of flowering plant in the family Poaceae. It is a bamboo endemic to Bolivia.

The species was first described by Stephen Andrew Renvoize in 1998.
