= Chusquea albilanata =

Scientific classification
- Kingdom: Plantae
- Clade: Tracheophytes
- Clade: Angiosperms
- Clade: Monocots
- Clade: Commelinids
- Order: Poales
- Family: Poaceae
- Genus: Chusquea
- Species: C. albilanata

Binomial name
- Chusquea albilanata L.G.Clark & Londoño

Species of grass

Chusquea albilanata is a species of Chusquea bamboo.

== Distribution ==
Chusquea albilanata endemic to Colombia and Ecuador in South America.
