= Aulonemia bogotensis =

Scientific classification
- Kingdom: Plantae
- Clade: Tracheophytes
- Clade: Angiosperms
- Clade: Monocots
- Clade: Commelinids
- Order: Poales
- Family: Poaceae
- Genus: Aulonemia
- Species: A. bogotensis

Binomial name
- Aulonemia bogotensis L.G.Clark, Londoño & M.Kobay.

Species of grass

Aulonemia bogotensis is a species of flowering plant in the family Poaceae. It is a bamboo which is endemic to Colombia.
