= Aulonemia jauaensis =

Scientific classification
- Kingdom: Plantae
- Clade: Tracheophytes
- Clade: Angiosperms
- Clade: Monocots
- Clade: Commelinids
- Order: Poales
- Family: Poaceae
- Genus: Aulonemia
- Species: A. jauaensis

Binomial name
- Aulonemia jauaensis Judz. & Davidse

Species of grass

Aulonemia jauaensis is a species of flowering plant in the family Poaceae. It is a bamboo endemic to Venezuela.
