= Aulonemia yanachagensis =

Scientific classification
- Kingdom: Plantae
- Clade: Tracheophytes
- Clade: Angiosperms
- Clade: Monocots
- Clade: Commelinids
- Order: Poales
- Family: Poaceae
- Genus: Aulonemia
- Species: A. yanachagensis

Binomial name
- Aulonemia yanachagensis Judz. & C.D.Tyrrell

Species of grass

Aulonemia yanachagensis is a species of flowering plant of the family Poaceae. It is a bamboo native to Pasco Department of central Peru.
