= Chusquea subulata =

Scientific classification
- Kingdom: Plantae
- Clade: Tracheophytes
- Clade: Angiosperms
- Clade: Monocots
- Clade: Commelinids
- Order: Poales
- Family: Poaceae
- Genus: Chusquea
- Species: C. subulata

Binomial name
- Chusquea subulata L.G.Clark

Species of grass

Chusquea subulata is a species of Chusquea bamboo in the grass family.

== Synonyms ==
There are no synonyms.

== Distribution ==
Chusquea subulata is endemic to Colombia and Ecuador.

== Description ==
The woody stem has a width of 70 to 80 millimeters and can grow upwards of 7 to 10 meters in height.
