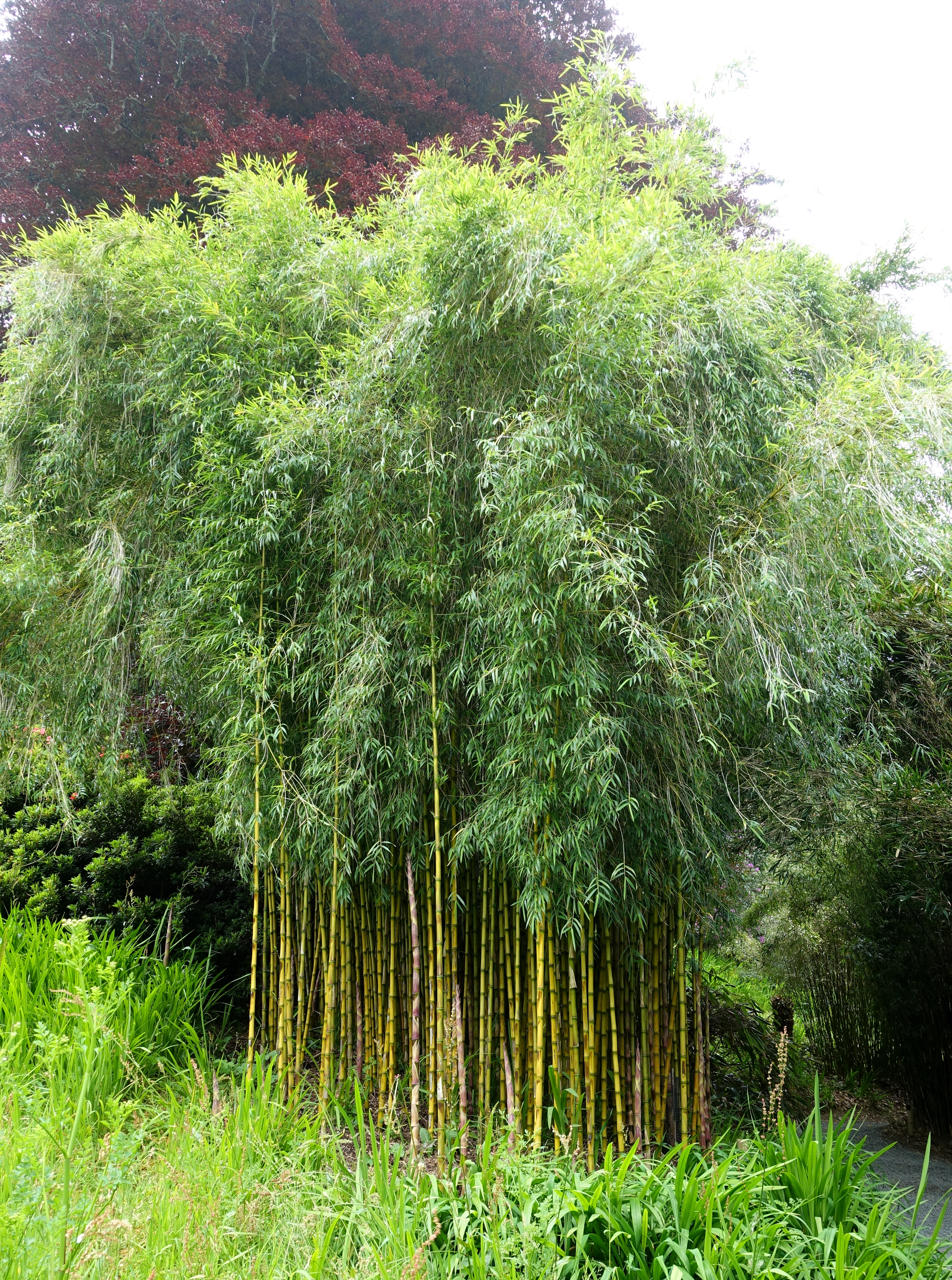
- Habit

Scientific classification
- Kingdom: Plantae
- Clade: Tracheophytes
- Clade: Angiosperms
- Clade: Monocots
- Clade: Commelinids
- Order: Poales
- Family: Poaceae
- Genus: Chusquea
- Species: C. gigantea

Binomial name
- Chusquea gigantea Demoly

= Chusquea gigantea =

Species of bamboo

Chusquea gigantea is a species of bamboo in the family Poaceae, native to central Chile. A clumping bamboo with solid stems, it has gained the Royal Horticultural Society's Award of Garden Merit.
