= Aulonemia cochabambensis =

Scientific classification
- Kingdom: Plantae
- Clade: Tracheophytes
- Clade: Angiosperms
- Clade: Monocots
- Clade: Commelinids
- Order: Poales
- Family: Poaceae
- Genus: Aulonemia
- Species: A. cochabambensis

Binomial name
- Aulonemia cochabambensis Judz. & L.G.Clark

Species of grass

Aulonemia cochabambensis is a species of flowering plant in the family Poaceae. It is a bamboo endemic to Cochabamba Department in Bolivia. The species is part of the grass family and is endemic to Latin America.
