= Stelanemia =

Scientific classification
- Kingdom: Plantae
- Clade: Tracheophytes
- Clade: Angiosperms
- Clade: Monocots
- Clade: Commelinids
- Order: Poales
- Family: Poaceae
- Subfamily: Bambusoideae
- Tribe: Bambuseae
- Subtribe: Arthrostylidiinae
- Genus: Stelanemia; C.D.Tyrrell, L.G.Clark, P.L.Viana & Santos-Gonç.

Species
- Stelanemia geniculata P.L.Viana & Filg.; Stelanemia setigera (Hack.) C.D.Tyrrell, L.G.Clark, P.L.Viana & Santos-Gonç.; Stelanemia setosa (Londoño & L.G.Clark) C.D.Tyrrell, L.G.Clark, P.L.Viana & Santos-Gonç.

Genus of bamboo

Stelanemia is a genus of bamboo. It includes three species native to eastern Brazil.

- Stelanemia geniculata P.L.Viana & Filg. – Minas Gerais
- Stelanemia setigera (Hack.) C.D.Tyrrell, L.G.Clark, P.L.Viana & Santos-Gonç. – Bahia and Rio de Janeiro
- Stelanemia setosa (Londoño & L.G.Clark) C.D.Tyrrell, L.G.Clark, P.L.Viana & Santos-Gonç. – São Paulo
