= Olmeca clarkiae =

Scientific classification
- Kingdom: Plantae
- Clade: Tracheophytes
- Clade: Angiosperms
- Clade: Monocots
- Clade: Commelinids
- Order: Poales
- Family: Poaceae
- Genus: Olmeca
- Species: O. clarkiae

Binomial name
- Olmeca clarkiae (Davidse & R.W.Pohl) Ruiz-Sanchez, Sosa & Mejía-Saulés

Synonyms
- Aulonemia clarkiae Davidse & R.W.Pohl (1992) (basionym); Guadua clarkiae (Davidse & R.W.Pohl) D.L.Fu

Species of grass

Olmeca clarkiae is a species of flowering plant in the family Poaceae. It is a bamboo native to Honduras and Chiapas state of southern Mexico.

The species was first described as Aulonemia clarkiae by Gerrit Davidse and Richard Walter Pohl in 1992. In 2011 Eduardo Ruiz-Sanchez, Victoria Sosa, and M.Teresa Mejía-Saulés placed the species in the genus Olmeca as O. clarkiae.
