= Chusquea nana =

Conservation status
- Near Threatened (IUCN 3.1)

Scientific classification
- Kingdom: Plantae
- Clade: Tracheophytes
- Clade: Angiosperms
- Clade: Monocots
- Clade: Commelinids
- Order: Poales
- Family: Poaceae
- Genus: Chusquea
- Species: C. nana

Binomial name
- Chusquea nana (L.G.Clark) L.G.Clark

Synonyms
- Neurolepis nana L.G.Clark

Species of grass

Chusquea nana is a species of grass in the family Poaceae. It is found only in Ecuador.
