= Aulonemia nitida =

Scientific classification
- Kingdom: Plantae
- Clade: Tracheophytes
- Clade: Angiosperms
- Clade: Monocots
- Clade: Commelinids
- Order: Poales
- Family: Poaceae
- Genus: Aulonemia
- Species: A. nitida

Binomial name
- Aulonemia nitida Judz.

Species of grass

Aulonemia nitida is a species of flowering plant in the family Poaceae. It is a bamboo endemic to Guyana.

The species was first described by Emmet J. Judziewicz in 2005.
