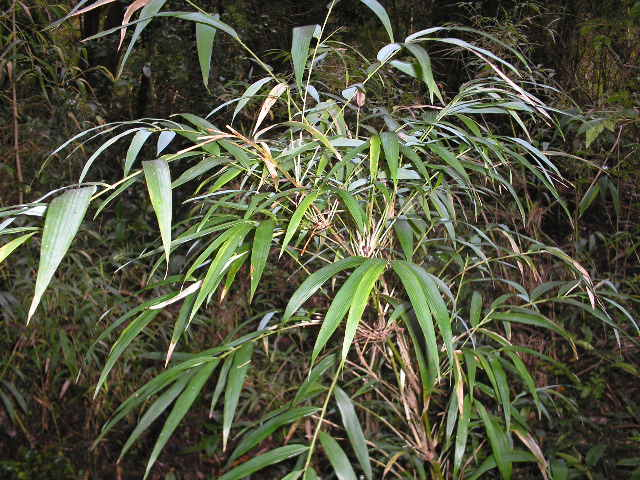

Scientific classification
- Kingdom: Plantae
- Clade: Tracheophytes
- Clade: Angiosperms
- Clade: Monocots
- Clade: Commelinids
- Order: Poales
- Family: Poaceae
- Genus: Chusquea
- Species: C. quila

Binomial name
- Chusquea quila Kunth (1829)

= Chusquea quila =

Species of grass

Chusquea quila, or Spanish: quila, is a perennial bamboo that grows in the humid temperate forests of Chile and Argentina.

In contrast to most bamboos, it grows as a dense, climbing or decumbent shrub. Its aerial culms are solid, unlike most bamboos, which have hollow culms. Chusquea quila may form pure stands called quilantales occupying all the understory of a forest. Chusquea quila and whole quilantales flower every 10 to 30 years (or 18 to 20 years in some accounts). The seeding that follow the flowering has been associated with mouse vermin.

Flour can be prepared from its seeds and its shoots are edible. Chusquea quila species have been historically harvested for seed by indigenous peoples. Mapuche and Pehuenche people are reported to have made flour of the seeds.
