= Aulonemia dinirensis =

Scientific classification
- Kingdom: Plantae
- Clade: Tracheophytes
- Clade: Angiosperms
- Clade: Monocots
- Clade: Commelinids
- Order: Poales
- Family: Poaceae
- Genus: Aulonemia
- Species: A. dinirensis

Binomial name
- Aulonemia dinirensis Judz. & Riina

Species of grass

Aulonemia dinirensis is a species flowering plant in the family Poaceae. It is a bamboo native to Venezuela, where it is known from Dinira National Park in El Tocuyo at 2700 meters elevation.
