= Olmeca fulgor =

Scientific classification
- Kingdom: Plantae
- Clade: Tracheophytes
- Clade: Angiosperms
- Clade: Monocots
- Clade: Commelinids
- Order: Poales
- Family: Poaceae
- Genus: Olmeca
- Species: O. fulgor

Binomial name
- Olmeca fulgor (Soderstr.) Ruiz-Sanchez, Sosa & Mejía-Saulés

Synonyms
- Aulonemia fulgor Soderstr.; Guadua fulgor (Soderstr.) D.L.Fu

Species of grass

Aulonemia fulgor is a species of flowering plant in the family Poaceae. It is a bamboo native to Veracruz and Oaxaca states in southern Mexico. It is found mainly in North America.

The species was first described as Aulonemia fuller by Thomas Robert Soderstrom in 1988. In 2011 Eduardo Ruiz-Sanchez, Victoria Sosa, and M.Teresa Mejía-Saulés placed the species in genus Olmeca as O. fulgor.
