= Cambajuva =

Scientific classification
- Kingdom: Plantae
- Clade: Tracheophytes
- Clade: Angiosperms
- Clade: Monocots
- Clade: Commelinids
- Order: Poales
- Family: Poaceae
- Subfamily: Bambusoideae
- Tribe: Bambuseae
- Subtribe: Arthrostylidiinae
- Genus: Cambajuva; P.L.Viana, L.G.Clark & Filg. (2013)
- Species: C. ulei

Binomial name
- Cambajuva ulei (Hack.) P.L.Viana, L.G.Clark & Filg. (2013)

Synonyms
- Arundinaria ulei Hack. (1903); Aulonemia ulei (Hack.) McClure & L.B.Sm. (1967)

Genus of flowering plants

Cambajuva is a genus of flowering plants belonging to the family Poaceae. It contains a single species, Cambajuva ulei, a bamboo native to southern Brazil.
