= Quixiume =

Scientific classification
- Kingdom: Plantae
- Clade: Tracheophytes
- Clade: Angiosperms
- Clade: Monocots
- Clade: Commelinids
- Order: Poales
- Family: Poaceae
- Subfamily: Bambusoideae
- Tribe: Bambuseae
- Subtribe: Arthrostylidiinae
- Genus: Quixiume; C.D.Tyrrell, L.G.Clark, P.L.Viana & Santos-Gonç.
- Species: Q. radiata

Binomial name
- Quixiume radiata (Rupr.) C.D.Tyrrell, L.G.Clark, P.L.Viana & Santos-Gonç.

Synonyms
- Arundinaria glaziovii Hack.; Arundinaria glaziovii var. macroblephara E.G.Camus; Arundinaria macroblephara Glaz. ex E.G.Camus; Arundinaria radiata Rupr. (1839) (basionym); Arundinaria ramosissima Hack.; Aulonemia fimbriatifolia L.G.Clark; Aulonemia glaziovii (Hack.) McClure; Aulonemia radiata (Rupr.) McClure & L.B.Sm.; Aulonemia ramosissima (Hack.) McClure

Genus of bamboo

Quixiume is a genus of bamboo in the grass family. It includes a single species, Quixiume radiata, which is endemic to southern and southeastern Brazil. It is native to the mountains, including the Serra do Mar, Serra da Mantiqueira, and Serra do Espinhaço, of Santa Catarina, Paraná, São Paulo, Rio de Janeiro, and Minas Gerais states. It grows in dense ombrophilous forest (Araucaria moist forests), mixed ombrophilous forest (Alto Paraná Atlantic forests), and montane shrublands (Campos Rupestres) from 900 and 2000 meters elevation. The southernmost populations in Santa Caterina and Paraná are mostly from 800 to 1000 meters elevation, while the northern populations are mostly above 1500 metres elevation.

The species was first described as Arundinaria radiata by Franz Josef Ruprecht in 1839. In 2024 Christopher D. Tyrrell, Lynn G. Clark, Pedro Lage Viana, and Ana Paula Santos-Gonçalves placed the species in the newly-described monotypic genus Quixiume as Q. radiata. Quixiume is a Brazilian Portuguese transliteration of an indigenous name associated with woody bamboos in southern and western Brazil.
