= Didymogonyx =

Scientific classification
- Kingdom: Plantae
- Clade: Tracheophytes
- Clade: Angiosperms
- Clade: Monocots
- Clade: Commelinids
- Order: Poales
- Family: Poaceae
- Subfamily: Bambusoideae
- Tribe: Bambuseae
- Subtribe: Arthrostylidiinae
- Genus: Didymogonyx (L.G. Clark & Londoño) C.D. Tyrrell, L.G. Clark & Londoño

Type species
- Rhipidocladum geminatum (McClure) McClure

Synonyms
- Rhipidocladum sect. Didymogonyx L.G. Clark & Londoño

Genus of grasses

Didymogonyx is a genus of South American bamboo in the grass family.

Species

1. Didymogonyx geminatum (McClure) C.D.Tyrrell, L.G.Clark & Londoño - Colombia, Venezuela
2. Didymogonyx longispiculatum (Londoño & L.G.Clark) C.D.Tyrrell, L.G.Clark & Londoño - Colombia
