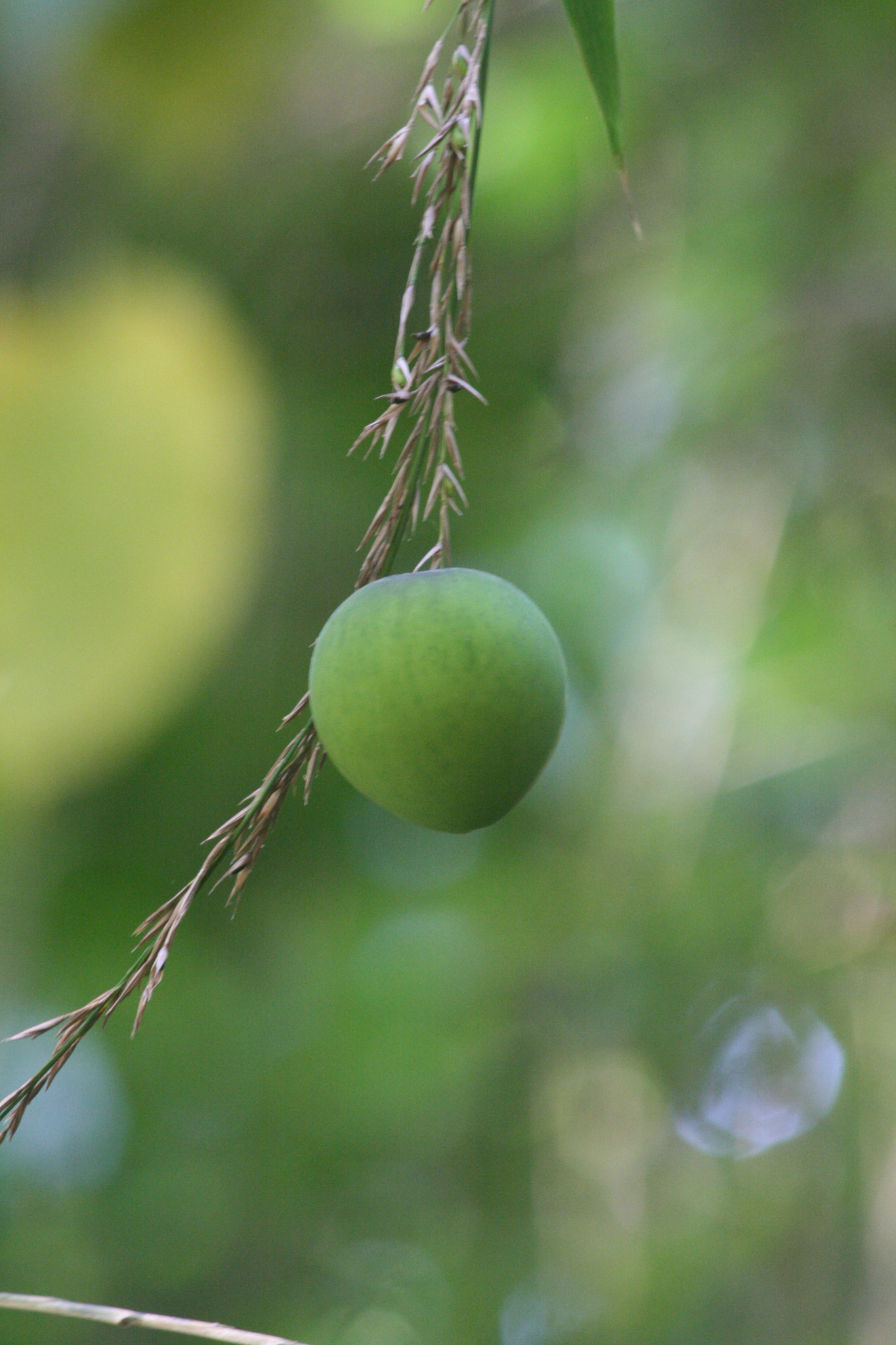
- Olmeca recta

Scientific classification
- Kingdom: Plantae
- Clade: Tracheophytes
- Clade: Angiosperms
- Clade: Monocots
- Clade: Commelinids
- Order: Poales
- Family: Poaceae
- Subfamily: Bambusoideae
- Tribe: Bambuseae
- Subtribe: Guaduinae
- Genus: Olmeca; Soderstr. 1982

Type species
- Olmeca reflexa Soderstr. 1982

Synonyms
- Olmeca Soderstr. 1981, not validly published

= Olmeca =

Genus of grasses

Olmeca is a genus of Mesoamerican bamboo in the grass family.

Olmeca is the only known New World bamboo having large fleshy fruits. It also has rhizomes with long necks and very open clumps.

The genus is named for the Olmec peoples of southern Mexico, who thrived in southern Mexico in the first millennium BCE.

Species

- Olmeca clarkiae (Davidse & R.W.Pohl) Ruiz-Sanchez, Sosa & Mejía-Saulés - Chiapas, Honduras
- Olmeca fulgor (Soderstr.) Ruiz-Sanchez - Oaxaca
- Olmeca recta Soderstr. - Veracruz
- Olmeca reflexa Soderstr. - Veracruz, Oaxaca, Chiapas
- Olmeca zapotecorum Ruiz-Sanchez, Sosa & Mejía-Saulés - Oaxaca
