= Athroostachys =

Scientific classification
- Kingdom: Plantae
- Clade: Tracheophytes
- Clade: Angiosperms
- Clade: Monocots
- Clade: Commelinids
- Order: Poales
- Family: Poaceae
- Subfamily: Bambusoideae
- Tribe: Bambuseae
- Subtribe: Arthrostylidiinae
- Genus: Athroostachys; Benth.
- Species: A. capitata

Binomial name
- Athroostachys capitata (Hook.) Benth.

Synonyms
- Merostachys capitata Hook.; Chusquea fimbriata Steud.; Chusquea glomerata Munro; Merostachys capitata var. angustifolia Döll; Merostachys capitata var. latifolia Döll

Genus of grasses

Athroostachys is a Brazilian genus of bamboo in the grass family.

The only known species is Athroostachys capitata, native to Brazil (States of Bahia, Mato Grosso, Paraná, Rio de Janeiro).

== See also ==
- List of Poaceae genera
