= Richard Walter Pohl =

American botanist

Dr. Richard W. Pohl (May 21, 1916 – September 3, 1993) was an American botanist and Professor of Botany at Iowa State University who was an expert in grasses, especially western hemisphere tropical woody bamboos. From 1950 to 1986, he served as Curator of Iowa State University's Ada Hayden Herbarium (ISC) and served as Professor Emeritus from his retirement in 1986 until his death in 1993. He obtained his B.S. from Marquette University, Milwaukee, Wisconsin, U.S.A. in 1939 and Ph.D. from University of Pennsylvania, Philadelphia, Pennsylvania, U.S.A. in 1947. As an undergraduate student, Pohl volunteered for the Milwaukee Public Museum Herbarium (MIL) in Milwaukee, Wisconsin, U.S.A.
