= Justin Goudot =

French scientist (1802–1847)

Justin Goudot (French pronunciation: [ʒystɛ̃ ɡudo]; 1802 – c. 1850) was a French explorer, and naturalist collector.

Goudot was born in Jura, France. He was attached to the Muséum national d'histoire naturelle in Paris as a collector naturalist. From 1822 to 1842 he was charged by the New Granada government with founding scientific institutions.

From 1828 Goudot began collecting bird skins for the Paris museum which held what was then the world's largest bird collection. He also collected mammals, reptiles, molluscs, insects and other invertebrates as well as botanical material. He returned to France in December 1842, and between 1843 and 1846 published a series of papers on the flora and fauna of Colombia. After 1848 he again visited Colombia, where he died around 1850.

The shining-green hummingbird (Lepidopyga goudoti ) was named in his honour by Jules Bourcier, and René-Primevère Lesson named the sickle-winged guan (Chamaepetes goudotii ) for him. Diptera collected by Goudot were described by Pierre-Justin-Marie Macquart.

A species of snake, Leptotyphlops goudotii, was named in his honour by André Marie Constant Duméril and Gabriel Bibron.
