= Eduard Hackel =

Austrian botanist (1850–1926)

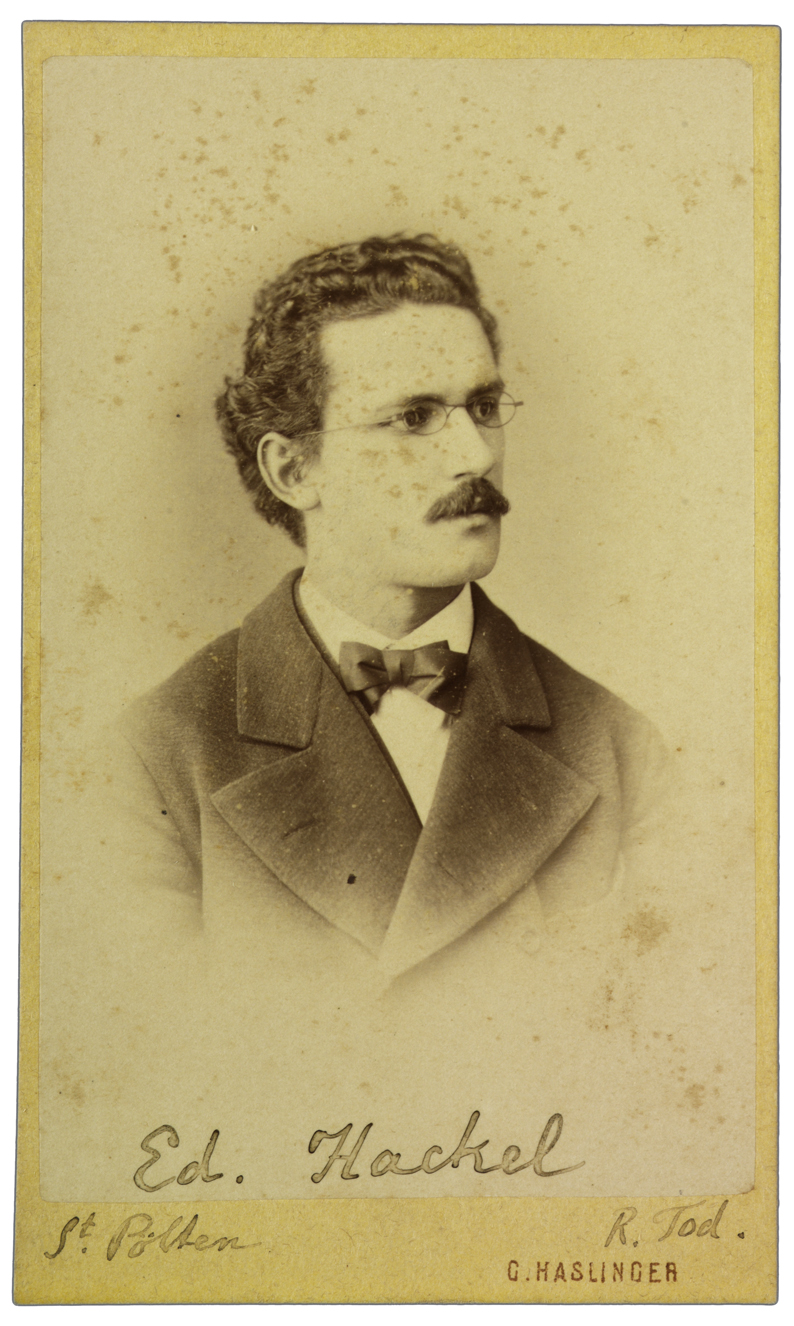
- Eduard Hackel
- Born: 17 March 1850; Haida, Bohemia
- Died: 2 February 1926 (aged 75); Attersee
- Known for: Poaceae
- Scientific career
- Fields: botany
- Author abbrev. (botany): Hack.

Eduard Hackel (17 March 1850 in Haida, Bohemia – 2 February 1926 in Attersee, Upper Austria) was an Austrian botanist. His father was a veterinarian in Haida (now Nový Bor) in Bohemia. He was married and had one son and a daughter.

Hackel studied at the Polytechnical Institute in Vienna, and became a substitute teacher at a high school in St. Pölten in 1869. He became a full professor of natural history there upon obtaining his teaching certificate in 1871 and remained in this position until his retirement in 1900.

== Agrostology ==
He published his first agrostology papers on grasses in 1871 and soon became known as a world expert agrostologist on the grass family (Poaceae). While he himself undertook only a single collecting trip – to Spain and Portugal, he was charged with working up collections of grasses mainly from Japan, Taiwan, New Guinea, Brazil and Argentina.

Apart from agrostologisty systematics, Hackel also contributed to the morphology and histology of members of the grass family.

The genus Hackelochloa (Poaceae) is named for him.

== Important works ==
- Monographia festucarum europeaearum 1864
- Gramineae in Martius’s Flora Brasiliensis, 1883,
- Catalogue raisonné des graminées du Portugal. 1880.
