= Lynn G. Clark =

American botanist (born 1956)

- Born: 1956 (age 69–70)
- Education: Iowa State University
- Scientific career
- Fields: Botany
- Workplaces: Iowa State University
- Doctoral advisor: Richard Pohl
- Author abbrev. (botany): L.G.Clark

Lynn G. Clark (born 1956) is an American professor of botany at Iowa State University, who is an expert in tropical woody bamboos. During her time at Iowa State, Clark has received several awards, including the College of Liberal Arts and Sciences International Service Award and the Iowa State University Award for Outstanding Achievement in Research. She is also the Director of Ada Hayden Herbarium at Iowa State University and has been for over 30 years.As a high school student, Clark worked summers with grass expert Thomas Soderstrom at the National Museum of Natural History. She obtained her Ph.D. in botany working with Richard Pohl at Iowa State.

== Education ==
In 1979, Clark obtained her B.S. in botany and horticulture at Michigan State University. She received her Ph.D. from Iowa State University in 1986 and is currently a professor at the university in the Department of Ecology, Evolution, and Organismal Biology. Her work currently focuses on investigating the systematics, evolution, and functional trait ecology of Neotropical bamboo, as well as general evolution of grasses.

She received the José Cuatrecasas Medal for Excellence in Tropical Botany in 2025.
