= Floyd Alonzo McClure =

American botanist

- Born: 14 August 1897; Shelby County, United States
- Died: April 15, 1970 (aged 72); Bethesda, United States
- Education: Otterbein College; Ohio State University
- Known for: Bamboo research
- Scientific career
- Fields: Botany

Floyd Alonzo McClure (14 August 1897, Shelby County, Ohio – 15 April 1970, Bethesda, Maryland) was an American botanist and plant collector. He was one of the world's leading experts on bamboo and worked in China for 24 years.

== Biography ==
McClure was educated at Otterbein College from 1914 to 1916. He transferred to Ohio State University, where he graduated with A.B. in 1918 and B.S. in agriculture in 1919. At Canton Christian College in Guangzhou, China, he was an instructor in horticulture from 1919 to 1923, an assistant professor of botany from 1923 to 1927, and curator of the herbarium from 1923 to 1927.

During his first three years there he gained unusual competence in the Cantonese language and led plant collecting trips in southern China and Indo-China.

In 1921 Kang-Peng To was the plant co-collector with McClure on Hainan Island. In 1927 the management of Canton Christian College was transferred from American to Chinese people, and the English name of the institution was changed to "Lingnan University". At Lingnan University, McClure was an assistant professor from 1927 to 1928, an associate professor from 1928 to 1931, a full professor from 1931 to 1941, and the curator of economic botany from 1927 to 1941. He was recalled to the US in 1941. During his time in China he went on three leaves of absence: on the first leave he married in 1922 his fiancée of seven years, on the second leave he received in 1928 his M.Sc. from Ohio State, on the third leave he received in 1936 his Ph.D. from Ohio State University. His doctoral dissertation was on the bamboo genus Schizostachyum. His bamboo research in China was supported by grants from the China Foundation for the Promotion of Education and Culture in 1929, from the Rockefeller Foundation in 1930 and 1934, and from the National Research Council in 1936.

McClure lived in Canton, China and went on collecting expeditions throughout Hainan province in 1921, 1922, 1929, and 1932. He collected bamboo specimens mainly, but occasionally other grasses, orchids, and other higher plants. He wrote about his daily experiences and observations in his diaries.

He published articles in journals sponsored by Lingnan University, as well as in The Ohio Journal of Science, The Scientific Monthly, Kew Bulletin of Miscellaneous Information, Blumea, and Journal of the Arnold Arboretum.

McClure held Guggenheim Fellowships for the academic years 1942–1943 and 1943–1944. In 1943 the Office of Scientific Research and Development recruited McClure to do research on bamboo ski poles for alpine troops in the U.S. Army. McClure visited Central American locations to do research and conduct experiments on bamboo species suitable for making ski poles.

In the 1940s, he was appointed honorary research associate for the National Museum of Natural History, a position he held until his death in 1970. Floyd McClure was instrumental in the introduction of Tonkin bamboo to the world.

In his research on bamboo, he worked in seven province of China, Indo-China, the Philippines, Central America, and South America. He created a large collection of bamboo species at the Barbour Lathrop Plant Introduction Garden near Savannah, Georgia. McClure's 1966 book The Bamboos—A Fresh Perspective gave a thorough presentation of how the bamboos are cultivated, propagated, and used. The book, dealing with bamboos in Asia and in the tropical Americas, is important for its compilation of literature on bamboos from eastern and western sources.

The 1960s was a period of active bamboo research in many parts of the world. McClure (1966) in his exhaustive work on the bamboo plant, pointed out that all parts of the vegetative and flowering structures should be used for bamboo classification. This was revolutionary in grass taxonomy, where floral characters often continue to be given undue weighting to this day. He offered a significant step forward in the taxonomic conquest of the bamboos of the Americas (McClure 1973) based on this philosophy of synthesizing all available knowledge.

McClure married Ruth Drury on 7 September 1922 in Dayton, Ohio. They met and became maritally engaged in 1915 when they were students at Otterbein College. In China they raised two young daughters, Sophie Louise (born in 1927 in Guangzhou) and Janet. Ruth became in 1959 his research assistant and worked with him daily until he died in 1970.

== Eponyms ==
- Maclurolyra tecta

== Selected publications ==
- McClure, F. A. (1935). "Bamboo—A Taxonomic Problem and an Economic Opportunity". The Scientific Monthly. 41 (3): 193–204. Bibcode:1935SciMo..41..193M. JSTOR 16035.
- McClure, F. A. (1942). "New bamboos from Venezuela and Colombia". Journal of the Washington Academy of Sciences. 32 (6): 167–183. JSTOR 24530843.
- McClure, F. A. (1945). "The vegetative characters of the bamboo genus Phyllostachys and descriptions of eight new species introduced from China". Journal of the Washington Academy of Sciences. 35 (9): 276–293. JSTOR 24530699.
- McClure, Floyd Alonzo (1953). Bamboo as a Building Material.
- McClure, F. A. (1956). "New Species in the Bamboo Genus Phyllostachys and Some Nomenclatural Notes". Journal of the Arnold Arboretum. 37 (2): 180–196. doi:10.5962/bhl.part.25736. JSTOR 43790889.
- McClure, F. A. (1963). "A New Feature in Bamboo Rhizome Anatomy". Rhodora. 65 (762): 134–136. JSTOR 23306586.
