= Callispa cumingii =

Scientific classification
- Kingdom: Animalia
- Phylum: Arthropoda
- Clade: Pancrustacea
- Class: Insecta
- Order: Coleoptera
- Suborder: Polyphaga
- Infraorder: Cucujiformia
- Family: Chrysomelidae
- Genus: Callispa
- Species: C. cumingii

Binomial name
- Callispa cumingii Baly, 1858

Species of beetle

Callispa cumingii is a species of beetle of the family Chrysomelidae. It is found in the Philippines (Leyte, Luzon, Palawan, Panay).

== Description ==
Adults are rather broader, shorter and less convex than Callispa bowringii, but can be easily distinguished by the emarginate thorax, the irregular puncturing of the sides of the elytra, and by the prominent, nearly rectangular humeral angles. The upper side is shining metallic blue. The head is smooth, subconvex above, slightly produced into an acute angle in front. The antennae are black, scarcely more than a third the length of the body. The thorax is transverse, twice as broad as long, the sides dilated, narrowly margined, nearly straight and subparallel behind, rounded in front. The anterior margin is slightly excavated, the surface subconvex, broadly excavated on either side, coarsely punctured, puncturing more scattered on the disc. The scutellum is broad and obtuse. The elytra are broadly ovate, the shoulders prominent, subrectangular, the humeral angle obtuse, the margin dilated and slightly deflexed, the apex regularly rounded, above subconvex, the disc punctate-striate, the puncturing rather fainter towards the apex, the margin closely and irregularly punctured. The body is shining black beneath, with the abdomen and legs obscure fulvous.

== Biology ==
This species has been recorded feeding on Bambusa glaucescens and Bambusa blumeana.
