= Callispa pusilla =

Scientific classification
- Kingdom: Animalia
- Phylum: Arthropoda
- Clade: Pancrustacea
- Class: Insecta
- Order: Coleoptera
- Suborder: Polyphaga
- Infraorder: Cucujiformia
- Family: Chrysomelidae
- Genus: Callispa
- Species: C. pusilla

Binomial name
- Callispa pusilla Gestro, 1896

Species of beetle

Callispa pusilla is a species of beetle of the family Chrysomelidae. It is found in Indonesia (Java, Sumatra) and Malaysia.

== Biology ==
This species has been found feeding on Calamus caesius, Calamus castaneus, Calamus insignis, Calamus manan, Calamus ornatus, Calamus scipionum, Calamus subangulatus, Daemonorops didymophylla, Daemonorops angustifolia, Eugeissona triste, Iguanura geonomiformis, Iguanura wallichiana, Korthalsia rigida, Korthalsia rostrata, Orania sylvicola and Salacca species.
