= Callispa korthalsiae =

Scientific classification
- Kingdom: Animalia
- Phylum: Arthropoda
- Class: Insecta
- Order: Coleoptera
- Suborder: Polyphaga
- Infraorder: Cucujiformia
- Family: Chrysomelidae
- Genus: Callispa
- Species: C. korthalsiae

Binomial name
- Callispa korthalsiae Schöller, 2008

Species of beetle

Callispa korthalsiae is a species of beetle of the family Chrysomelidae. It is found in Malaysia.

== Biology ==
Adults have been found feeding on Calamus manan, Calamus scipionum, Korthalsia rigida, Iguanura geonomiformis, Iguanura wallichiana, Orania sylvicola and Pinanga scortechinii.
