= Gogana abnormalis =

Scientific classification
- Domain: Eukaryota
- Kingdom: Animalia
- Phylum: Arthropoda
- Class: Insecta
- Order: Lepidoptera
- Family: Drepanidae
- Genus: Gogana
- Species: G. abnormalis

Binomial name
- Gogana abnormalis (Warren, 1897)

Synonyms
- Trotothyris abnormalis Warren, 1897

Species of hook-tip moth

Gogana abnormalis is a moth in the family Drepanidae first described by Warren in 1897. It is found on Borneo, Sumatra and Peninsular Malaysia.

The wingspan is about 28 mm. The forewings are pale pinkish fawn, the costal and subcostal veins marked with silvery scales. There is a large hyaline (glass-like) spot beyond the cell, edged with black and externally with ferruginous, with a small hyaline dot at its base. The outer line runs from the costa above the hyaline patch, forming the edge of the ferruginous border, and below the middle straight and oblique to the inner margin at two-thirds, becoming dark brown towards the anal angle, and followed by a ferruginous patch at the elbow. The costal area of the hindwings is pale and there is a dark diffuse pale-edged central line, as well as traces of a subterminal line from the apex to the elbow, which is ferruginous.

The larvae feed on Calamus manan.
