= Callispa cruentomarginata =

Scientific classification
- Kingdom: Animalia
- Phylum: Arthropoda
- Class: Insecta
- Order: Coleoptera
- Suborder: Polyphaga
- Infraorder: Cucujiformia
- Family: Chrysomelidae
- Genus: Callispa
- Species: C. cruentomarginata

Binomial name
- Callispa cruentomarginata Schöller, 2007

Species of beetle

Callispa cruentomarginata is a species of beetle of the family Chrysomelidae. It is found in Malaysia.

== Biology ==
This species has been recorded feeding on Calamus caeius, Calamus manan and Daemonorops didymophylla.
