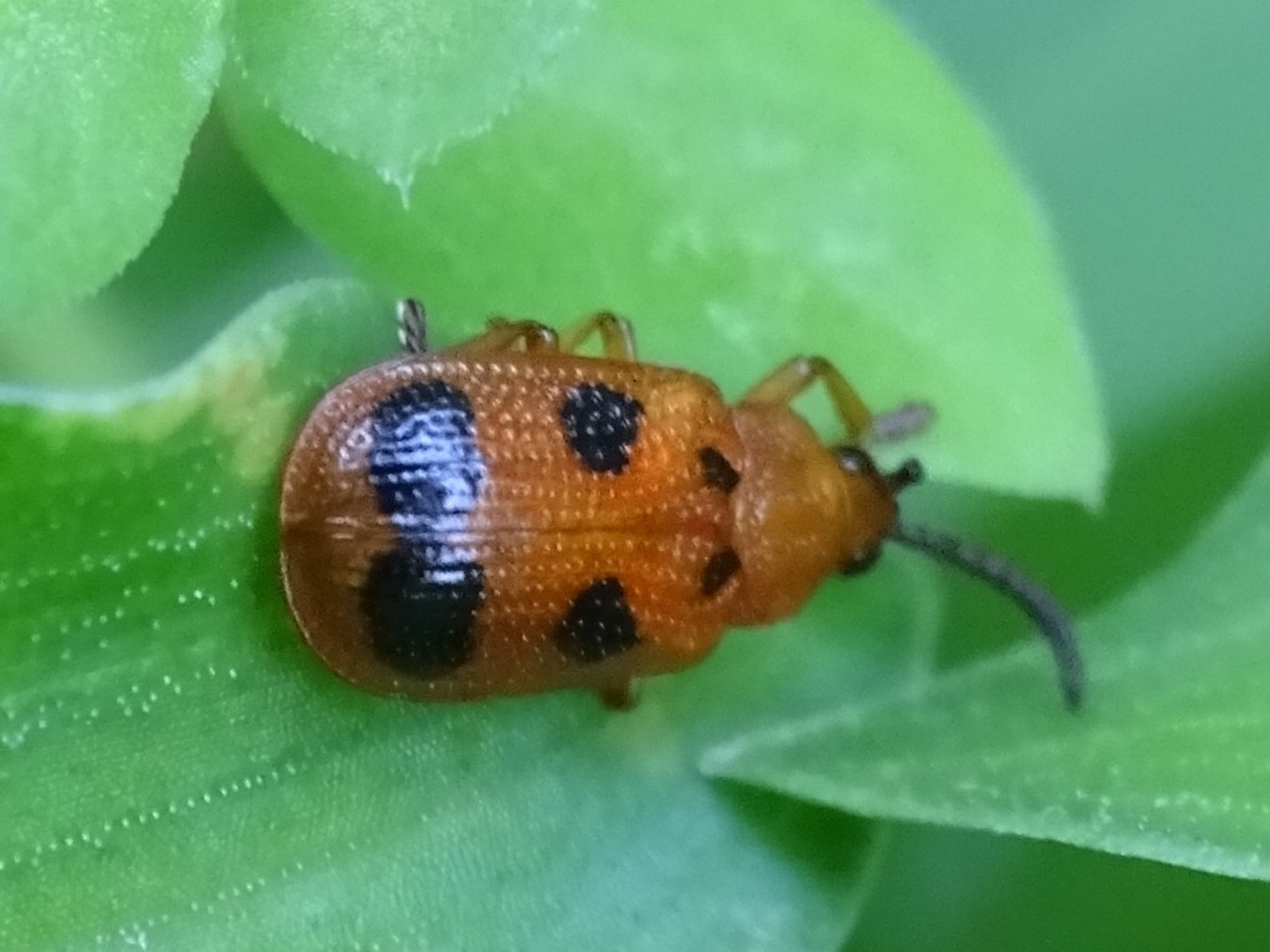

Scientific classification
- Kingdom: Animalia
- Phylum: Arthropoda
- Class: Insecta
- Order: Coleoptera
- Suborder: Polyphaga
- Infraorder: Cucujiformia
- Family: Chrysomelidae
- Subfamily: Cassidinae
- Tribe: Callispini
- Genus: Callispa
- Species: C. octopunctata

Binomial name
- Callispa octopunctata Baly, 1858

Synonyms
- Callispa octopunctata sexmaculata Weise, 1905

= Callispa octopunctata =

Species of beetle

Callispa octopunctata is a species of leaf beetle found in India and Sri Lanka.

== Description ==
Body length is about 4.50 to 5.75 mm. Body slightly elongate and oblong. Head, prothorax and elytra are reddish brown in color. Eyes are oval. Antennae about 1.60 to 2.10 mm long. The first antennal segment is reddish brown, and other segments are dark brown. Prothorax length is about 0.08 to 1.20, mm. Pronotal disc with four longitudinal depressions. Scutellum pentagonal. Elytral length is about 3.20 to 3.90 mm. Elytra oblong with eight rows of punctures at each elytron base. There are six black spots on elytra. Hind wings which are small and brown are about 5.00 mm long. Legs are elongated. Legs and ventrum are yellowish brown.

Indian population is elevated to subspecies level as Callispa octopunctata sexmaculata Weise, 1905. Body length is 4.30 to 5.25 mm. Head, prothorax and elytra are brown in color. Total length of antennae is 2.00 to 2.20 mm. Eyes are circular. Prothorax is 0.90 to 1.00 mm long. Elytral length is 3.50 to 3.75 mm. Hind wings length is 4.50 mm.
