= Gogana tenera =

Scientific classification
- Domain: Eukaryota
- Kingdom: Animalia
- Phylum: Arthropoda
- Class: Insecta
- Order: Lepidoptera
- Family: Drepanidae
- Genus: Gogana
- Species: G. tenera

Binomial name
- Gogana tenera (Swinhoe, 1902)

Synonyms
- Phalacra tenera Swinhoe, 1902

Species of hook-tip moth

Gogana tenera is a moth in the family Drepanidae first described by Charles Swinhoe in 1902. It is found on Borneo and Peninsular Malaysia.

Adults are uniform ochreous grey. The wings are crossed by many sinuous and more or less crenulated (scalloped) grey lines. The forewings have a black mark at the costa before the apex and a black line on the inner margin, which is continued along the outer margin. There is a blackish streak on the hindmargin before the angle. There are many grey specks and point on both wings and some prominent lines near the outer margin of the hindwings, containing a submarginal whitish band.

The larvae feed on Calamus manan.
