= Gogana =

Scientific classification
- Kingdom: Animalia
- Phylum: Arthropoda
- Clade: Pancrustacea
- Class: Insecta
- Order: Lepidoptera
- Family: Drepanidae
- Subfamily: Drepaninae
- Genus: Gogana; Walker, 1866

Species
- See text

Synonyms
- Ametroptila Warren, 1901; Phalacropsis Swinhoe, 1895 (preocc. Casey, 1889); Liocrops D. S. Fletcher, 1995; Trotothyris Warren, 1897

Moth genus in family Drepanidae

Gogana

Gogana is a genus of moths of the family Drepanidae. The genus was erected by Francis Walker in 1866. There are currently about 15 described species, all of which are found on Borneo, but some of which also have ranges in Sumatra and Peninsular Malaysia. The larvae feed on palms.

== Species ==
- Gogana abnormalis (found in Peninsular Malaysia and Sumatra)
  - food plants include Calamus manan
- Gogana bornormalis
- Gogana carnosa
- Gogana cottrillii (found in Peninsular Malaysia)
- Gogana conwayi
- Gogana fragilis
- Gogana integra (found in Peninsular Malaysia)
- Gogana kerara (found in Peninsular Malaysia)
  - food plants include Daemonorops grandis, Orania macrocladus
- Gogana ossicolor
- Gogana semibrevis
  - food plants include Calamus nanus
- Gogana specularis (found in Peninsular Malaysia)
- Gogana streptoperoides
- Gogana tenera (found in Peninsular Malaysia)
- Gogana turbinifera
