= Callispa flaveola =

Scientific classification
- Kingdom: Animalia
- Phylum: Arthropoda
- Clade: Pancrustacea
- Class: Insecta
- Order: Coleoptera
- Suborder: Polyphaga
- Infraorder: Cucujiformia
- Family: Chrysomelidae
- Genus: Callispa
- Species: C. flaveola

Binomial name
- Callispa flaveola Uhmann, 1931

Synonyms
- Callispa flavescens Uhmann, 1930 (preocc.)

Species of beetle

Callispa flaveola is a species of beetle in the family Chrysomelidae. It is known from China (Yunnan), Indonesia (Sumatra) and Vietnam. It was described in 1931 by German entomologist Erich Uhmann based on three specimens collected from Medan in Sumatra, and has been recorded feeding on species of Bambusa.
