= Callispa nigripennis =

Scientific classification
- Kingdom: Animalia
- Phylum: Arthropoda
- Class: Insecta
- Order: Coleoptera
- Suborder: Polyphaga
- Infraorder: Cucujiformia
- Family: Chrysomelidae
- Genus: Callispa
- Species: C. nigripennis

Binomial name
- Callispa nigripennis Chen & Yu, 1964

Species of beetle

Callispa nigripennis is a species of beetle of the family Chrysomelidae. It is found in China (Guangxi).
