= Callispa dimidiatipennis =

Scientific classification
- Kingdom: Animalia
- Phylum: Arthropoda
- Class: Insecta
- Order: Coleoptera
- Suborder: Polyphaga
- Infraorder: Cucujiformia
- Family: Chrysomelidae
- Genus: Callispa
- Species: C. dimidiatipennis

Binomial name
- Callispa dimidiatipennis Baly, 1858

Synonyms
- Callispa quadricollis Weise, 1897; Callispa hypoenops Maulik, 1919; Callispa dimidiatipennis latior Pic, 1924; Callispa jeanvoinei Pic, 1927; Callispa vicina Pic, 1927; Callispa vicina latithorax Pic, 1927; Callispa dimidiatipennis recticollis Gressitt, 1938

Species of beetle

Callispa dimidiatipennis is a species of beetle of the family Chrysomelidae. It is found in China (Hainan, Hunan, Yunnan), India (Assam, Meghalaya), Laos, Myanmar and Vietnam.

== Description ==
Adults are subelongate and shining rufo-fulvous. The posterior half of the elytra is bright metallic blue and the eyes and antennae are black, the latter with the basal joint rufous.

== Biology ==
This species has been recorded feeding on Bambusa species and Phragmites communis.
