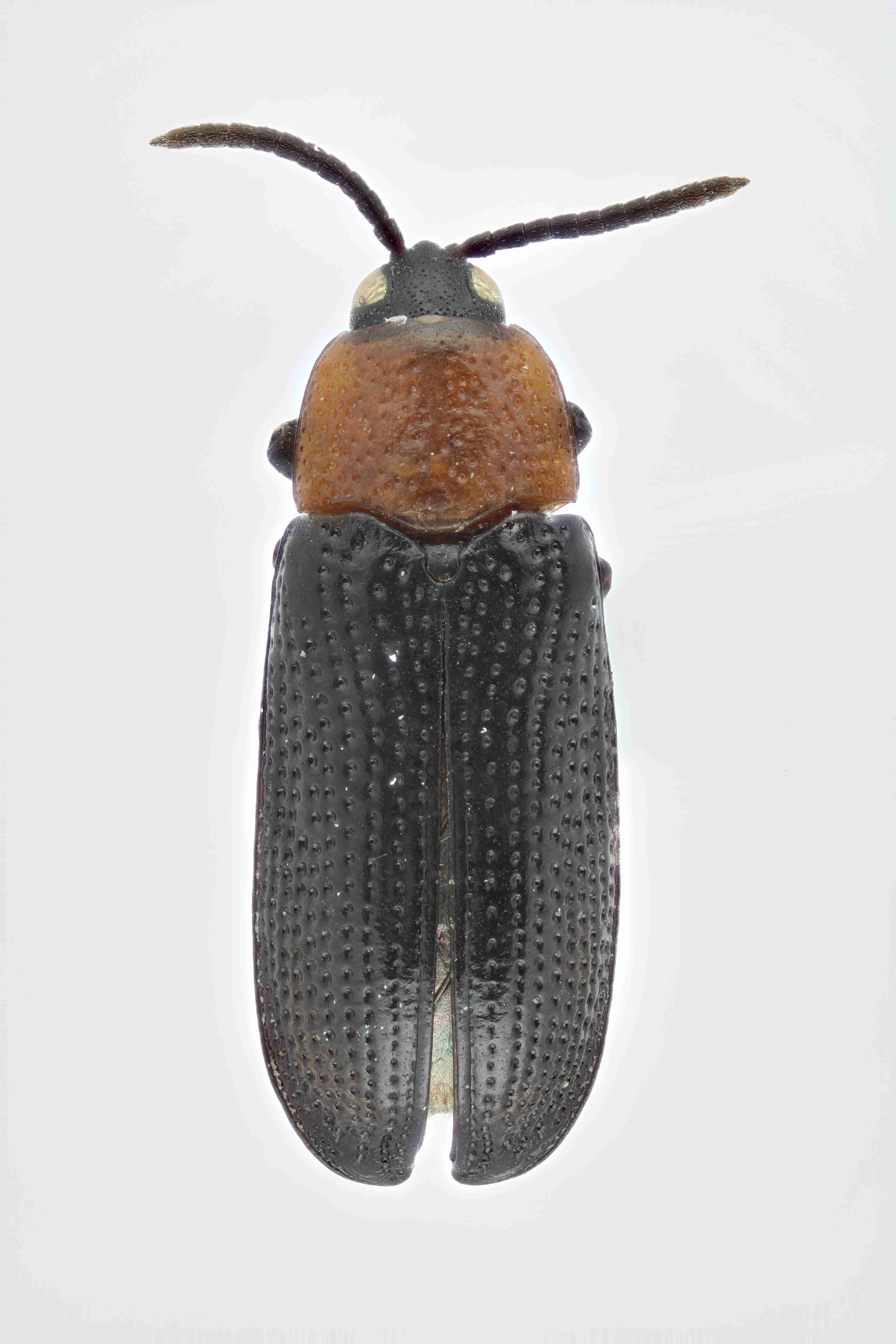

Scientific classification
- Kingdom: Animalia
- Phylum: Arthropoda
- Class: Insecta
- Order: Coleoptera
- Suborder: Polyphaga
- Infraorder: Cucujiformia
- Family: Chrysomelidae
- Genus: Callispa
- Species: C. semirufa

Binomial name
- Callispa semirufa Kraatz, 1895

= Callispa semirufa =

Species of beetle

Callispa semirufa is a species of beetle of the family Chrysomelidae. It is found in Cameroon, Congo, Senegal and Togo.
