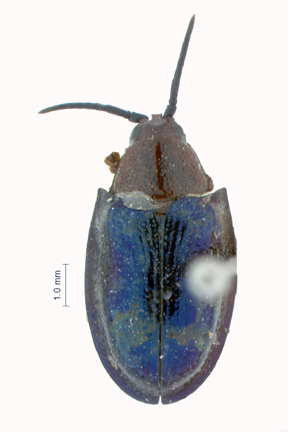

Scientific classification
- Kingdom: Animalia
- Phylum: Arthropoda
- Class: Insecta
- Order: Coleoptera
- Suborder: Polyphaga
- Infraorder: Cucujiformia
- Family: Chrysomelidae
- Subfamily: Cassidinae
- Tribe: Callispini
- Genus: Pseudocallispa; Uhmann, 1930
- Species: P. schultzei

Binomial name
- Pseudocallispa schultzei Uhmann, 1930

= Pseudocallispa =

Genus of beetles

Pseudocallispa is a genus of leaf beetles in the family Chrysomelidae. It is monotypic, being represented by the single species, Pseudocallispa schultzei, which is found in Philippines (Panaon, Mindanao, Nonoc).
