= Callispa weigeli =

Scientific classification
- Kingdom: Animalia
- Phylum: Arthropoda
- Class: Insecta
- Order: Coleoptera
- Suborder: Polyphaga
- Infraorder: Cucujiformia
- Family: Chrysomelidae
- Genus: Callispa
- Species: C. weigeli

Binomial name
- Callispa weigeli L. Medvedev, 2009

Species of beetle

Callispa weigeli is a species of beetle of the family Chrysomelidae. It is found in Nepal.
