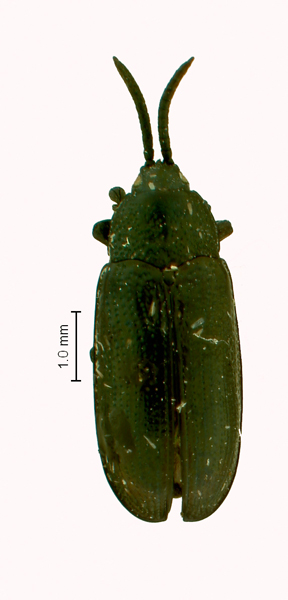

Scientific classification
- Kingdom: Animalia
- Phylum: Arthropoda
- Clade: Pancrustacea
- Class: Insecta
- Order: Coleoptera
- Suborder: Polyphaga
- Infraorder: Cucujiformia
- Family: Chrysomelidae
- Genus: Amblispa
- Species: A. laevigata

Binomial name
- Amblispa laevigata (Guérin-Méneville, 1844)

Synonyms
- Microrhopala laevigata Guérin-Méneville, 1844; Amblispa laevigata (Guérin-Méneville). Baly, 1858; Amblispa laevigata purpurascens Maulik, 1919; Amblispa laevigata viridis Maulik, 1919

= Amblispa laevigata =

Species of beetle

Amblispa laevigata, is a species of leaf beetle found in Bangladesh, India (Bihar, Himachal Pradesh, Karnataka, Kerala, Madhya Pradesh, Maharashtra, Tamil Nadu, Uttar Pradesh, West Bengal), Nepal, and Sri Lanka.

== Description ==
Adults are obscure blue-black. The front is produced into a small acute tooth, which forms the upper termination of a longitudinal ridge between the antennae. The thorax is punctured, as broad as long, narrowed from the base to the apex, sides rounded, anterior and posterior angles acute. The elytra are deeply punctate-striate.

== Life history ==
Host plants are grasses.
