= Callispa bioculata =

Scientific classification
- Kingdom: Animalia
- Phylum: Arthropoda
- Clade: Pancrustacea
- Class: Insecta
- Order: Coleoptera
- Suborder: Polyphaga
- Infraorder: Cucujiformia
- Family: Chrysomelidae
- Genus: Callispa
- Species: C. bioculata

Binomial name
- Callispa bioculata Uhmann, 1939

Species of beetle

Callispa bioculata is a species of beetle in the family Chrysomelidae. Described by German entomologist Erich Uhmann in 1939, it is found in Indonesia on the island of Java. It is known to feed on species of rattan, particularly Calamus species.
