= Callispa kuntzeni =

Scientific classification
- Kingdom: Animalia
- Phylum: Arthropoda
- Class: Insecta
- Order: Coleoptera
- Suborder: Polyphaga
- Infraorder: Cucujiformia
- Family: Chrysomelidae
- Genus: Callispa
- Species: C. kuntzeni

Binomial name
- Callispa kuntzeni Uhmann, 1932

Synonyms
- Callispa kuntzeni obscuripes Uhmann, 1961

Species of beetle

Callispa kuntzeni is a species of beetle of the family Chrysomelidae. It is found in Cameroon and Nigeria.
