= Callispa kalshoveni =

Scientific classification
- Kingdom: Animalia
- Phylum: Arthropoda
- Clade: Pancrustacea
- Class: Insecta
- Order: Coleoptera
- Suborder: Polyphaga
- Infraorder: Cucujiformia
- Family: Chrysomelidae
- Genus: Callispa
- Species: C. kalshoveni

Binomial name
- Callispa kalshoveni Uhmann, 1955

Species of beetle

Callispa kalshoveni is a species of beetle in the family Chrysomelidae. It is found in Indonesia (Java).

== Biology ==
Adults have been found feeding on Pinanga species.
