= Callispa similis =

Scientific classification
- Kingdom: Animalia
- Phylum: Arthropoda
- Clade: Pancrustacea
- Class: Insecta
- Order: Coleoptera
- Suborder: Polyphaga
- Infraorder: Cucujiformia
- Family: Chrysomelidae
- Genus: Callispa
- Species: C. similis

Binomial name
- Callispa similis Uhmann, 1931

Species of beetle

Callispa similis is a species of beetle of the family Chrysomelidae. It is found in the Democratic Republic of the Congo.
