= Gogana integra =

Scientific classification
- Domain: Eukaryota
- Kingdom: Animalia
- Phylum: Arthropoda
- Class: Insecta
- Order: Lepidoptera
- Family: Drepanidae
- Genus: Gogana
- Species: G. integra

Binomial name
- Gogana integra Warren, 1900

Species of hook-tip moth

Gogana integra is a moth in the family Drepanidae first described by Warren in 1900. It is found on Borneo and Peninsular Malaysia.

The wingspan is about 26 mm. The forewings pale mouse colour, dusted with darker and with traces of a dark central and double submarginal fascia, marked with dark brown and ferruginous. The hindwings are without markings.
