= Callispa ruficollis =

Scientific classification
- Kingdom: Animalia
- Phylum: Arthropoda
- Class: Insecta
- Order: Coleoptera
- Suborder: Polyphaga
- Infraorder: Cucujiformia
- Family: Chrysomelidae
- Genus: Callispa
- Species: C. ruficollis

Binomial name
- Callispa ruficollis Fairmaire, 1889

Species of beetle

Callispa ruficollis is a species of beetle of the family Chrysomelidae. It is found in China (Fujian, Guangxi, Guizhou, Hunan, Hubei, Xikang, Sichuan).

== Biology ==
This species has been found feeding on Phyllostachys viridis.
