= Callispa nigripes =

Scientific classification
- Kingdom: Animalia
- Phylum: Arthropoda
- Class: Insecta
- Order: Coleoptera
- Suborder: Polyphaga
- Infraorder: Cucujiformia
- Family: Chrysomelidae
- Genus: Callispa
- Species: C. nigripes

Binomial name
- Callispa nigripes Baly, 1858

Synonyms
- Callispa nigripes abdominalis Uhmann, 1961

Species of beetle

Callispa nigripes is a species of beetle of the family Chrysomelidae. It is found in Angola, Cameroon, Guinea, Liberia, Senegal, South Africa and Togo.

== Description ==
Adults are elongate and pale fulvous.

== Biology ==
This species has been found feeding on Cyperaceae species.
