= Callispa guttata =

Scientific classification
- Kingdom: Animalia
- Phylum: Arthropoda
- Clade: Pancrustacea
- Class: Insecta
- Order: Coleoptera
- Suborder: Polyphaga
- Infraorder: Cucujiformia
- Family: Chrysomelidae
- Genus: Callispa
- Species: C. guttata

Binomial name
- Callispa guttata Uhmann, 1933

Species of beetle

Callispa guttata is a species of beetle in the family Chrysomelidae. It is found in the Philippines (Luzon).
