= Callispa septemmaculata =

Scientific classification
- Kingdom: Animalia
- Phylum: Arthropoda
- Clade: Pancrustacea
- Class: Insecta
- Order: Coleoptera
- Suborder: Polyphaga
- Infraorder: Cucujiformia
- Family: Chrysomelidae
- Genus: Callispa
- Species: C. septemmaculata

Binomial name
- Callispa septemmaculata Weise, 1908

Species of beetle

Callispa septemmaculata is a species of beetle of the family Chrysomelidae. It is found in India (Madras).
