= Callispa whitei =

Scientific classification
- Kingdom: Animalia
- Phylum: Arthropoda
- Clade: Pancrustacea
- Class: Insecta
- Order: Coleoptera
- Suborder: Polyphaga
- Infraorder: Cucujiformia
- Family: Chrysomelidae
- Genus: Callispa
- Species: C. whitei

Binomial name
- Callispa whitei Baly, 1858

Species of beetle

Callispa whitei is a species of beetle of the family Chrysomelidae. It is found in Indonesia (Borneo, Sumatra) and Malaysia.

== Description ==
Adults are ovate and shining blackish-chalybeate. The antennae are black, with the two basal joints piceous, the second joint scarcely longer than the first. The head is smooth, the forehead produced in front into an angular process which scarcely conceals the insertion of the antennae, its apex obtuse, forming the upper termination of a longitudinal ridge, which runs down the face between the antennae. The thorax is transverse, as broad as long, the sides rounded, narrowed from their base to the apex, narrowly margined. The apical margin is indistinctly emarginate, above moderately convex, transversely impressed near the middle of the base, the sides concave, covered with a number of large shallow punctures, their interstices granulate. The disc is smooth and shining, with a few distinct impressions scattered here and there over its surface. The apical and lateral borders are narrowly edged with piceous, while the rest of the surface is blackish-chalybeate. The scutellum is transverse and pentagonal. The elytra are ovate, the sides broadly margined, the apex rounded, above moderately convex, deeply punctate-striate, the dilated margin with an irregular row of shallow punctures near the outer edge. Beneath pale piceous, with the abdomen rufo-fuscous.
