= Callispa pseudapicalis =

Scientific classification
- Kingdom: Animalia
- Phylum: Arthropoda
- Class: Insecta
- Order: Coleoptera
- Suborder: Polyphaga
- Infraorder: Cucujiformia
- Family: Chrysomelidae
- Genus: Callispa
- Species: C. pseudapicalis

Binomial name
- Callispa pseudapicalis Yu, 1985

Species of beetle

Callispa pseudapicalis is a species of beetle of the family Chrysomelidae. It is found in China (Yunnan).

== Biology ==
This species has been found feeding on Phragmites communis.
