= Callispa feae =

Scientific classification
- Kingdom: Animalia
- Phylum: Arthropoda
- Clade: Pancrustacea
- Class: Insecta
- Order: Coleoptera
- Suborder: Polyphaga
- Infraorder: Cucujiformia
- Family: Chrysomelidae
- Genus: Callispa
- Species: C. feae

Binomial name
- Callispa feae Baly, 1888

Species of beetle

Callispa feae is a species of beetle of the family Chrysomelidae. It is found in China (Yunnan), Laos, Myanmar, Nepal, Thailand and Vietnam.

== Biology ==
This species has been recorded feeding on Bambusa species.
