= Callispa marginicollis =

Scientific classification
- Kingdom: Animalia
- Phylum: Arthropoda
- Class: Insecta
- Order: Coleoptera
- Suborder: Polyphaga
- Infraorder: Cucujiformia
- Family: Chrysomelidae
- Genus: Callispa
- Species: C. marginicollis

Binomial name
- Callispa marginicollis Medvedev, 2012

Species of beetle

Callispa marginicollis is a species of beetle of the family Chrysomelidae. It is found in China (Yunnan).

== Description ==
Adults reach a length of about 4.4 mm. They are black, the prothorax with the anterior and side margins narrowly fulvous. The elytra are metallic blue and the abdomen is fulvous. The legs are dark fulvous.

== Etymology ==
The species name refers to the colour of the prothorax.
