= Gogana kerara =

Scientific classification
- Kingdom: Animalia
- Phylum: Arthropoda
- Clade: Pancrustacea
- Class: Insecta
- Order: Lepidoptera
- Family: Drepanidae
- Genus: Gogana
- Species: G. kerara

Binomial name
- Gogana kerara (Swinhoe, 1902)

Synonyms
- Phalacra kerara Swinhoe, 1902

Species of hook-tip moth

Gogana kerara is a moth in the family Drepanidae first described by Charles Swinhoe in 1902. It is found on Borneo and Peninsular Malaysia.

The ground colour is uniform ochreous grey, the wings with a minute blackish dot at the end of each cell, the forewings with a rather broad brownish median band, a discal line of blackish lunules. The space to the outer margin is brownish, containing a pale sinuous submarginal line. The hindwings have a faintly indicated discal line of blackish lunules. The space beyond is brown with a subterminal pale sinuous line as on the forewings.

The larvae feed on Daemonorops grandis and Orania silvicola.
