= Callispa kilimana =

Scientific classification
- Kingdom: Animalia
- Phylum: Arthropoda
- Class: Insecta
- Order: Coleoptera
- Suborder: Polyphaga
- Infraorder: Cucujiformia
- Family: Chrysomelidae
- Genus: Callispa
- Species: C. kilimana

Binomial name
- Callispa kilimana Kolbe, 1891

Species of beetle

Callispa kilimana is a species of beetle of the family Chrysomelidae. It is found in Congo, Kenya, Sierra Leone and Rwanda.

== Biology ==
Adults have been found feeding on Zea mays and Coffea arabica.
