= Callispa splendidula =

Scientific classification
- Kingdom: Animalia
- Phylum: Arthropoda
- Clade: Pancrustacea
- Class: Insecta
- Order: Coleoptera
- Suborder: Polyphaga
- Infraorder: Cucujiformia
- Family: Chrysomelidae
- Genus: Callispa
- Species: C. splendidula

Binomial name
- Callispa splendidula Gestro, 1897

Species of beetle

Callispa splendidula is a species of beetle of the family Chrysomelidae. It is found in Indonesia (Borneo, Sulawesi, Java), Malaysia and the Philippines (Palawan).

== Biology ==
This species has been found feeding on Metroxylon species.
