= Callispa africana =

Scientific classification
- Kingdom: Animalia
- Phylum: Arthropoda
- Class: Insecta
- Order: Coleoptera
- Suborder: Polyphaga
- Infraorder: Cucujiformia
- Family: Chrysomelidae
- Genus: Callispa
- Species: C. africana

Binomial name
- Callispa africana Baly, 1876

Species of beetle

Callispa africana is a species of beetle of the family Chrysomelidae. It is found in Niger, Nigeria and Togo.
