= Callispa brevicornis =

Scientific classification
- Kingdom: Animalia
- Phylum: Arthropoda
- Class: Insecta
- Order: Coleoptera
- Suborder: Polyphaga
- Infraorder: Cucujiformia
- Family: Chrysomelidae
- Genus: Callispa
- Species: C. brevicornis

Binomial name
- Callispa brevicornis Baly, 1869

Species of beetle

Callispa brevicornis is a species of beetle of the family Chrysomelidae. It is found in China (Yunnan), Laos, Indonesia (Sumatra), Myanmar and Malaysia.
