= Callispa horni =

Scientific classification
- Kingdom: Animalia
- Phylum: Arthropoda
- Clade: Pancrustacea
- Class: Insecta
- Order: Coleoptera
- Suborder: Polyphaga
- Infraorder: Cucujiformia
- Family: Chrysomelidae
- Genus: Callispa
- Species: C. horni

Binomial name
- Callispa horni Uhmann, 1927

Species of beetle

Callispa horni is a species of beetle in the family Chrysomelidae. It is known from Sikkim in India. Described by German entomologist Erich Uhmann in 1927, the holotype specimen and one paratype are deposited in the Senckenberg German Entomological Institute.
