= Callispa nigritarsata =

Scientific classification
- Kingdom: Animalia
- Phylum: Arthropoda
- Class: Insecta
- Order: Coleoptera
- Suborder: Polyphaga
- Infraorder: Cucujiformia
- Family: Chrysomelidae
- Genus: Callispa
- Species: C. nigritarsata

Binomial name
- Callispa nigritarsata Maulik, 1919

Species of beetle

Callispa nigritarsata, is a species of leaf beetle found in Sri Lanka.

== Description ==
The body length is about 4.50 to 5.00 mm, elongate, and brown.
