= Callispa ajaya =

Scientific classification
- Kingdom: Animalia
- Phylum: Arthropoda
- Class: Insecta
- Order: Coleoptera
- Suborder: Polyphaga
- Infraorder: Cucujiformia
- Family: Chrysomelidae
- Genus: Callispa
- Species: C. ajaya

Binomial name
- Callispa ajaya Basu, 1999

Species of beetle

Callispa ajaya is a species of beetle of the family Chrysomelidae. It is found in India (West Bengal).
