= Callispa violaceicornis =

Scientific classification
- Kingdom: Animalia
- Phylum: Arthropoda
- Class: Insecta
- Order: Coleoptera
- Suborder: Polyphaga
- Infraorder: Cucujiformia
- Family: Chrysomelidae
- Genus: Callispa
- Species: C. violaceicornis

Binomial name
- Callispa violaceicornis Pic, 1937

Species of beetle

Callispa violaceicornis is a species of beetle of the family Chrysomelidae. It is found in India.
