= Callispa steineri =

Scientific classification
- Kingdom: Animalia
- Phylum: Arthropoda
- Class: Insecta
- Order: Coleoptera
- Suborder: Polyphaga
- Infraorder: Cucujiformia
- Family: Chrysomelidae
- Genus: Callispa
- Species: C. steineri

Binomial name
- Callispa steineri Schöller, 2007

Species of beetle

Callispa steineri is a species of beetle of the family Chrysomelidae. It is found in Malaysia.

== Biology ==
This species has been found feeding on Calamus caesius.
