= Callispa donckieri =

Scientific classification
- Kingdom: Animalia
- Phylum: Arthropoda
- Class: Insecta
- Order: Coleoptera
- Suborder: Polyphaga
- Infraorder: Cucujiformia
- Family: Chrysomelidae
- Genus: Callispa
- Species: C. donckieri

Binomial name
- Callispa donckieri Pic, 1924

Species of beetle

Callispa donckieri is a species of beetle of the family Chrysomelidae. It is found in China (Fukien, Guangxi, Szechuan).
