= Callispa sebakue =

Scientific classification
- Kingdom: Animalia
- Phylum: Arthropoda
- Class: Insecta
- Order: Coleoptera
- Suborder: Polyphaga
- Infraorder: Cucujiformia
- Family: Chrysomelidae
- Genus: Callispa
- Species: C. sebakue

Binomial name
- Callispa sebakue Péringuey, 1908

Synonyms
- Callispa sebakuensis Spaeth, 1935

Species of beetle

Callispa sebakue is a species of beetle of the family Chrysomelidae. It is found in Mozambique and Zimbabwe.

== Description ==
Adults reach a length of about 6 mm. They are red, with a black head and cerulean elytra. The head is punctate on both sides and reddish at the apex. The prothorax is rounded at the apex, not at all attenuated, then sub-obliquely enlarged towards the base, at this point wider at the apex by about a third, scarcely more convex, with no discoidal depressions, above the scutellum impressed in the middle of the base, densely covered with almost sub-foveolate dots, the middle part of the disc narrowly punctured. The scutellum is sub-rufescens, impressed posteriorly. The elytra run almost parallel to the prothorax, longer by a quarter, deeply punctate-striate. The body moderately punctate beneath.
