= Callispa corpulenta =

Scientific classification
- Kingdom: Animalia
- Phylum: Arthropoda
- Clade: Pancrustacea
- Class: Insecta
- Order: Coleoptera
- Suborder: Polyphaga
- Infraorder: Cucujiformia
- Family: Chrysomelidae
- Genus: Callispa
- Species: C. corpulenta

Binomial name
- Callispa corpulenta Uhmann, 1954

Species of beetle

Callispa corpulenta is a species of beetle in the family Chrysomelidae. Described in 1954 by German entomologist Erich Uhmann, it is known from Malaysia. The holotype specimen, collected from Batang Padang District in 1924, is held in the collection of the Natural History Museum, London.
