= Callispa tarsata =

Scientific classification
- Kingdom: Animalia
- Phylum: Arthropoda
- Clade: Pancrustacea
- Class: Insecta
- Order: Coleoptera
- Suborder: Polyphaga
- Infraorder: Cucujiformia
- Family: Chrysomelidae
- Genus: Callispa
- Species: C. tarsata

Binomial name
- Callispa tarsata Baly, 1869

Species of beetle

Callispa tarsata is a species of beetle of the family Chrysomelidae. It is found in India.
