= Callispa intermedia =

Scientific classification
- Kingdom: Animalia
- Phylum: Arthropoda
- Class: Insecta
- Order: Coleoptera
- Suborder: Polyphaga
- Infraorder: Cucujiformia
- Family: Chrysomelidae
- Genus: Callispa
- Species: C. intermedia

Binomial name
- Callispa intermedia Uhmann, 1932

Species of beetle

Callispa intermedia is a species of beetle in the family Chrysomelidae. It is found in Cameroon.
