= Callispa nigronotata =

Scientific classification
- Kingdom: Animalia
- Phylum: Arthropoda
- Class: Insecta
- Order: Coleoptera
- Suborder: Polyphaga
- Infraorder: Cucujiformia
- Family: Chrysomelidae
- Genus: Callispa
- Species: C. nigronotata

Binomial name
- Callispa nigronotata (Pic, 1931)

Synonyms
- Hispa nigronotata Pic, 1931

Species of beetle

Callispa nigronotata is a species of beetle of the family Chrysomelidae. It is found in India.
