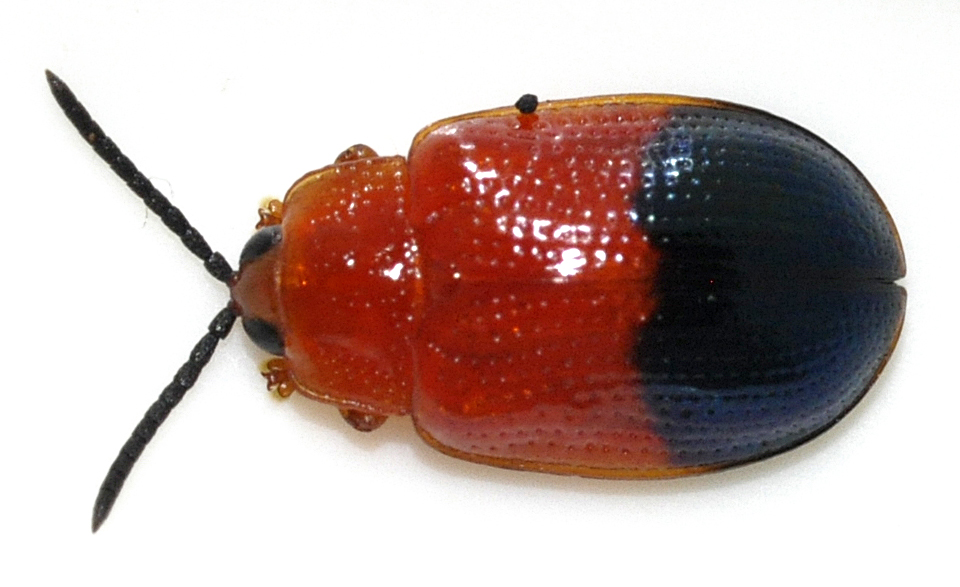

Scientific classification
- Kingdom: Animalia
- Phylum: Arthropoda
- Clade: Pancrustacea
- Class: Insecta
- Order: Coleoptera
- Suborder: Polyphaga
- Infraorder: Cucujiformia
- Family: Chrysomelidae
- Subfamily: Cassidinae
- Tribe: Callispini
- Genus: Callispa; Baly, 1858

Synonyms
- Melispa Weise 1897; Miltinaspis Weise 1904; Rhinocassis Spaeth 1905

= Callispa =

Genus of beetles

Callispa is a genus of tortoise beetles (insects in the subfamily Cassidinae).

== Species ==
Subgenus Callispa

- Callispa africana Baly, 1876
- Callispa ajaya Basu, 1999
- Callispa almora Maulik, 1923
- Callispa amabilis Gestro, 1910
- Callispa andrewesi (Weise, 1897)
- Callispa angonina Spaeth, 1935
- Callispa angusta Gressitt, 1950
- Callispa angusticollis Maulik, 1919
- Callispa apicalis Pic, 1924
- Callispa arcana Duvivier, 1892
- Callispa assama Maulik, 1919
- Callispa australis (Péringuey, 1898)
- Callispa beccarii Gestro, 1910
- Callispa biarcuata Chen & Yu, 1961
- Callispa bicolor Gestro, 1910
- Callispa bicoloripes (Pic, 1930)
- Callispa bijaya (Basu, 1999)
- Callispa bioculata (Uhmann, 1939)
- Callispa bipartita Kung & Yu, 1961
- Callispa boettcheri Uhmann, 1931
- Callispa bottegi Gestro, 1898
- Callispa bowringii Baly, 1858
- Callispa brettinghami Baly, 1869
- Callispa brevicornis Baly, 1869
- Callispa brevipes Maulik, 1919
- Callispa brihata Basu, 1999
- Callispa cassidoides (Guérin-Méneville, 1844)
- Callispa cavicollis Spaeth, 1935
- Callispa coeruleodorsata Maulik, 1919
- Callispa confertae Schöller, 2007
- Callispa contaminata Weise, 1913
- Callispa corpulenta Uhmann, 1954
- Callispa cribrata Gestro, 1896
- Callispa cruentomarginata Schöller, 2007
- Callispa cumingii Baly, 1858
- Callispa curta Weise, 1897
- Callispa cyanea Chen & Yu, 1961
- Callispa cyanipennis Pic, 1924
- Callispa debilis Gressitt & Kimoto, 1963
- Callispa dimidiatipennis Baly, 1858
- Callispa donckieri Pic, 1924
- Callispa doriae Gestro, 1910
- Callispa drescheri Uhmann, 1935
- Callispa duodecimaculata Chapuis, 1876
- Callispa elegans Baly, 1876
- Callispa elliptica Gressitt, 1939
- Callispa errans Péringuey, 1908
- Callispa expansicollis Maulik, 1919
- Callispa fallax Uhmann, 1930-1932
- Callispa feae Baly, 1888
- Callispa filiformis L Medvedev, 1992
- Callispa flaveola Uhmann, 1931
- Callispa flavescens Weise, 1891
- Callispa flavonotata Pic, 1924
- Callispa fortunii Baly, 1858
- Callispa fraudulenta Würmli, 1976
- Callispa frontalis L Medvedev, 1992
- Callispa fulva Gestro, 1897
- Callispa fulvescens Chen & Yu, 1961
- Callispa fulvipes Spaeth, 1935
- Callispa fulvonigra Maulik, 1919
- Callispa galinae L Medvedev, 1992
- Callispa guttata Uhmann, 1933
- Callispa hessei Uhmann, 1934
- Callispa himalayana L Medvedev, 1993
- Callispa horni Uhmann, 1927
- Callispa houjayi Lee, Świętojańska, & Staines, 2012
- Callispa ianthorufa Schöller, 2007
- Callispa impressa Uhmann, 1942
- Callispa induta Uhmann, 1930
- Callispa insignis Baly, 1858
- Callispa intermedia Uhmann, 1932
- Callispa jaya Basu, 1999
- Callispa kabakovi L Medvedev, 1992
- Callispa kalshoveni Uhmann, 1955
- Callispa karena Maulik, 1919
- Callispa keram Shameem & Prathapan, 2013
- Callispa kilimana Kolbe, 1891
- Callispa korthalsiae Schöller, 2008
- Callispa krishnashunda Maulik, 1919
- Callispa kuntzeni Uhmann, 1932
- Callispa limbata Gestro, 1906
- Callispa limbifera Yu & Kang, 1961
- Callispa loxia Weise, 1897
- Callispa luzonica Pic, 1930
- Callispa maculipennis Gestro, 1911
- Callispa maindoni (Pic, 1943)
- Callispa marginicollis Medvedev, 2012
- Callispa marginipennis Gestro, 1899
- Callispa marshalli Spaeth, 1935
- Callispa mashonensis Spaeth, 1935
- Callispa metroxylonis Uhmann, 1929
- Callispa minima Gestro, 1902
- Callispa minor Gestro, 1888
- Callispa montivaga Maulik, 1919
- Callispa mungphua Maulik, 1919
- Callispa nagaja Maulik, 1919
- Callispa natalensis Baly, 1858
- Callispa neavei Spaeth, 1935
- Callispa nigricollis Chen & Yu, 1961
- Callispa nigricornis Baly, 1858
- Callispa nigripennis Chen & Yu, 1964
- Callispa nigripes Baly, 1858
- Callispa nigritarsata Maulik, 1919
- Callispa nigronotata (Pic, 1931)
- Callispa nigrovittata Gestro, 1917
- Callispa nyakaensis Uhmann, 1934
- Callispa nyassica Spaeth, 1935
- Callispa obliqua Chen & Yu, 1964
- Callispa octopunctata Baly, 1858
- Callispa ovata Gestro, 1899
- Callispa paharia Basu, 1999
- Callispa pallida Gestro, 1888
- Callispa parva Schöller, 2008
- Callispa pelengana Uhmann, 1954
- Callispa penangana Uhmann, 1953
- Callispa philippinica Uhmann, 1931
- Callispa picitarsis Uhmann, 1930-1932
- Callispa pita Maulik, 1919
- Callispa popovi Chen & Yu, 1961
- Callispa porcedens Uhmann, 1939
- Callispa pseudapicalis Yu, 1985
- Callispa puella Gestro, 1919
- Callispa puellaris Pic, 1930
- Callispa pusilla Gestro, 1896
- Callispa quadricollis Yu & Li, 2002
- Callispa recticollis L Medvedev, 1992
- Callispa regularis Uhmann, 1954
- Callispa rhodesiaca Spaeth, 1935
- Callispa roepkei Uhmann, 1929
- Callispa ruficollis Fairmaire, 1889
- Callispa rufiventris Uhmann, 1928
- Callispa salaccae Schöller, 2008
- Callispa scipionae Schöller, 2008
- Callispa scutellaris Weise, 1897
- Callispa sebakue Péringuey, 1908
- Callispa semirufa Kraatz, 1895
- Callispa septemmaculata Weise, 1908
- Callispa silacea Weise, 1902
- Callispa similis Uhmann, 1931
- Callispa simillima Würmli, 1976
- Callispa spaethi Uhmann, 1931
- Callispa specialis Yu, 1985
- Callispa splendidula Gestro, 1897
- Callispa steineri Schöller, 2007
- Callispa submarginata L Medvedev, 1993
- Callispa sundara Maulik, 1919
- Callispa tarsata Baly, 1869
- Callispa testacea Kraatz, 1895
- Callispa testaceicornis Pic, 1925
- Callispa testaceipes Pic, 1924
- Callispa tibangana Uhmann, 1939
- Callispa tsoui Lee, Świętojańska, & Staines, 2012
- Callispa ugandina Spaeth, 1935
- Callispa uhmanni Chen & Yu, 1961
- Callispa umtalina Péringuey, 1908
- Callispa undulata Uhmann, 1933
- Callispa unicolor Weise, 1904
- Callispa uniformis Uhmann, 1943
- Callispa vietnamica Kimoto, 1998
- Callispa vioaceicornis Pic, 1937
- Callispa vittata Baly, 1858
- Callispa voronovae L Medvedev, 1992
- Callispa weigeli L. Medvedev, 2009
- Callispa whitei Baly, 1858

Subgenus Callispella Spaeth, 1935

- Callispa bayoni Gestro, 1911
- Callispa gracilicornis Weise, 1910
- Callispa lamottei Uhmann, 1954

Incerte Sedis

- Callispa daurica Mannerheim (China: Sichuan)
- Callispa pretiosum Baly (China: Sichuan)
- Callispa signata (Motschulsky) (China: Sichuan)
