= Callispa fulvonigra =

Scientific classification
- Kingdom: Animalia
- Phylum: Arthropoda
- Class: Insecta
- Order: Coleoptera
- Suborder: Polyphaga
- Infraorder: Cucujiformia
- Family: Chrysomelidae
- Genus: Callispa
- Species: C. fulvonigra

Binomial name
- Callispa fulvonigra Maulik, 1919

Species of beetle

Callispa fulvonigra, is a species of leaf beetle found in Sri Lanka.
