= Callispa mashonensis =

Scientific classification
- Kingdom: Animalia
- Phylum: Arthropoda
- Class: Insecta
- Order: Coleoptera
- Suborder: Polyphaga
- Infraorder: Cucujiformia
- Family: Chrysomelidae
- Genus: Callispa
- Species: C. mashonensis

Binomial name
- Callispa mashonensis Spaeth, 1935

Species of beetle

Callispa mashonensis is a species of beetle of the family Chrysomelidae. It is found in Congo and Zimbabwe.
