= Callispa silacea =

Scientific classification
- Kingdom: Animalia
- Phylum: Arthropoda
- Class: Insecta
- Order: Coleoptera
- Suborder: Polyphaga
- Infraorder: Cucujiformia
- Family: Chrysomelidae
- Genus: Callispa
- Species: C. silacea

Binomial name
- Callispa silacea Weise, 1902

Species of beetle

Callispa silacea is a species of beetle of the family Chrysomelidae. It is found in Congo, Kenya, Mozambique, South Africa, Tanzania and Uganda.
