= Callispa limbifera =

Scientific classification
- Kingdom: Animalia
- Phylum: Arthropoda
- Class: Insecta
- Order: Coleoptera
- Suborder: Polyphaga
- Infraorder: Cucujiformia
- Family: Chrysomelidae
- Genus: Callispa
- Species: C. limbifera

Binomial name
- Callispa limbifera Yu & Kang, 1961

Species of beetle

Callispa limbifera is a species of beetle of the family Chrysomelidae. It is found in China (Szechuan).
