= Callispa cassidoides =

Scientific classification
- Kingdom: Animalia
- Phylum: Arthropoda
- Clade: Pancrustacea
- Class: Insecta
- Order: Coleoptera
- Suborder: Polyphaga
- Infraorder: Cucujiformia
- Family: Chrysomelidae
- Genus: Callispa
- Species: C. cassidoides

Binomial name
- Callispa cassidoides (Guérin-Méneville, 1844)

Synonyms
- Cephaloleia cassidoides Guérin-Méneville, 1844; Calliaspis rufina Boheman, 1850

Species of beetle

Callispa cassidoides is a species of beetle of the family Chrysomelidae. It is found in Indonesia (Java).

== Biology ==
This species has been recorded feeding on rattan.
