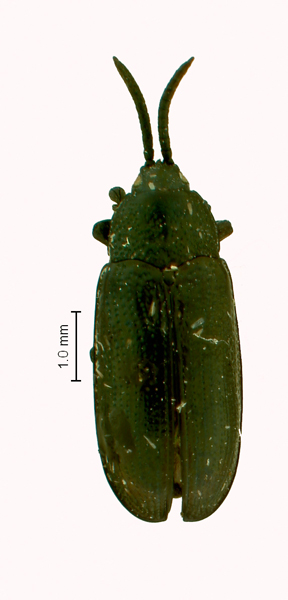
- Amblispa laevigata

Scientific classification
- Kingdom: Animalia
- Phylum: Arthropoda
- Clade: Pancrustacea
- Class: Insecta
- Order: Coleoptera
- Suborder: Polyphaga
- Infraorder: Cucujiformia
- Family: Chrysomelidae
- Subfamily: Cassidinae
- Tribe: Callispini
- Genus: Amblispa; Baly, 1858

= Amblispa =

Genus of leaf beetles

Amblispa is a genus of beetles belonging to the family Chrysomelidae, commonly known as leaf beetles.

== Species ==
- Amblispa dohrnii Baly, 1858
- Amblispa laevigata (Guérin-Méneville, 1844)
