= Callispa cyanea =

Scientific classification
- Kingdom: Animalia
- Phylum: Arthropoda
- Class: Insecta
- Order: Coleoptera
- Suborder: Polyphaga
- Infraorder: Cucujiformia
- Family: Chrysomelidae
- Genus: Callispa
- Species: C. cyanea

Binomial name
- Callispa cyanea Chen & Yu, 1961

Synonyms
- Callispa cyanea fukienica Chen & Yu, 1964

Species of beetle

Callispa cyanea is a species of beetle of the family Chrysomelidae. It is found in China (Fukien, Guangdong, Guangxi, Yunnan) and Vietnam.
