= Callispa pallida =

Scientific classification
- Kingdom: Animalia
- Phylum: Arthropoda
- Clade: Pancrustacea
- Class: Insecta
- Order: Coleoptera
- Suborder: Polyphaga
- Infraorder: Cucujiformia
- Family: Chrysomelidae
- Genus: Callispa
- Species: C. pallida

Binomial name
- Callispa pallida Gestro, 1888

Synonyms
- Callispa fleutiauxi Baly, 1889; Callispa curtipennis Pic, 1926

Species of beetle

Callispa pallida is a species of beetle of the family Chrysomelidae. It is found in Cambodia, China (Yunnan), Laos, Myanmar, Thailand and Vietnam.

== Biology ==
This species has been found feeding on Bambusa species.
