= Callispa australis =

Scientific classification
- Kingdom: Animalia
- Phylum: Arthropoda
- Class: Insecta
- Order: Coleoptera
- Suborder: Polyphaga
- Infraorder: Cucujiformia
- Family: Chrysomelidae
- Genus: Callispa
- Species: C. australis

Binomial name
- Callispa australis (Péringuey, 1898)

Synonyms
- Amblispa australis Péringuey, 1898

Species of beetle

Callispa australis is a species of beetle of the family Chrysomelidae. It is found in Mozambique and South Africa.
