= Callispa cyanipennis =

Scientific classification
- Kingdom: Animalia
- Phylum: Arthropoda
- Class: Insecta
- Order: Coleoptera
- Suborder: Polyphaga
- Infraorder: Cucujiformia
- Family: Chrysomelidae
- Genus: Callispa
- Species: C. cyanipennis

Binomial name
- Callispa cyanipennis Pic, 1924

Species of beetle

Callispa cyanipennis is a species of beetle of the family Chrysomelidae. It is found in China (Guangdong).
