= Gogana specularis =

Scientific classification
- Domain: Eukaryota
- Kingdom: Animalia
- Phylum: Arthropoda
- Class: Insecta
- Order: Lepidoptera
- Family: Drepanidae
- Genus: Gogana
- Species: G. specularis

Binomial name
- Gogana specularis Walker, 1866

Species of hook-tip moth

Gogana specularis is a moth in the family Drepanidae first described by Francis Walker in 1866. It is found on Borneo and Peninsular Malaysia.

Adults are purplish cinereous (ash grey), the wings with a very few indistinct darker lines. There is a slightly curved submarginal line of whitish points and a dark brown marginal line. The forewings have a short exterior band, consisting of five connected brown-bordered nearly hyaline (glass-like) spots.
