= Callispa gracilicornis =

Scientific classification
- Kingdom: Animalia
- Phylum: Arthropoda
- Clade: Pancrustacea
- Class: Insecta
- Order: Coleoptera
- Suborder: Polyphaga
- Infraorder: Cucujiformia
- Family: Chrysomelidae
- Genus: Callispa
- Species: C. gracilicornis

Binomial name
- Callispa gracilicornis Weise, 1910

Synonyms
- Callispa gracilicornis garambae Uhmann, 1961

Species of beetle

Callispa gracilicornis is a species of beetle of the family Chrysomelidae. It is found in Congo, Guinea, Mozambique and Tanzania.
