= Callispa uniformis =

Scientific classification
- Kingdom: Animalia
- Phylum: Arthropoda
- Class: Insecta
- Order: Coleoptera
- Suborder: Polyphaga
- Infraorder: Cucujiformia
- Family: Chrysomelidae
- Genus: Callispa
- Species: C. uniformis

Binomial name
- Callispa uniformis Uhmann, 1943

Species of beetle

Callispa uniformis is a species of beetle of the family Chrysomelidae. It is found in the Democratic Republic of the Congo.
