= Callispa elliptica =

Scientific classification
- Kingdom: Animalia
- Phylum: Arthropoda
- Class: Insecta
- Order: Coleoptera
- Suborder: Polyphaga
- Infraorder: Cucujiformia
- Family: Chrysomelidae
- Genus: Callispa
- Species: C. elliptica

Binomial name
- Callispa elliptica Gressitt, 1939

Species of beetle

Callispa elliptica is a species of beetle of the family Chrysomelidae. It is found in China (Jiangxi).
