= Callispa karena =

Scientific classification
- Kingdom: Animalia
- Phylum: Arthropoda
- Class: Insecta
- Order: Coleoptera
- Suborder: Polyphaga
- Infraorder: Cucujiformia
- Family: Chrysomelidae
- Genus: Callispa
- Species: C. karena

Binomial name
- Callispa karena Maulik, 1919

Species of beetle

Callispa karena is a species of beetle of the family Chrysomelidae. It is found in China (Guangdong, Hainan, Yunnan), India (Meghalaya), Laos, Myanmar and Vietnam.

== Biology ==
Adults have been found feeding on Bambusa species.
