= Callispa unicolor =

Scientific classification
- Kingdom: Animalia
- Phylum: Arthropoda
- Class: Insecta
- Order: Coleoptera
- Suborder: Polyphaga
- Infraorder: Cucujiformia
- Family: Chrysomelidae
- Genus: Callispa
- Species: C. unicolor

Binomial name
- Callispa unicolor Weise, 1904

Synonyms
- Callispa gestroi Péringuey 1908; Callispa sulcicollis Weise, 1911

Species of beetle

Callispa unicolor is a species of beetle of the family Chrysomelidae. It is found in Zimbabwe.

== Description ==
Adults reach a length of about 5 mm. They are black and shiny. The antennae are rather thick, reaching the base of the thorax and the prothorax is rounded and attenuated on both sides at the front, then straight, deeply and broadly longitudinally impressed on both sides towards the middle of the disc, the middle part of the disc somewhat higher on the sides, deeply impressed at the base, marked on both sides with some bipartite serrated dots, with longitudinal and lateral impressions. The scutellum is impunctate.
