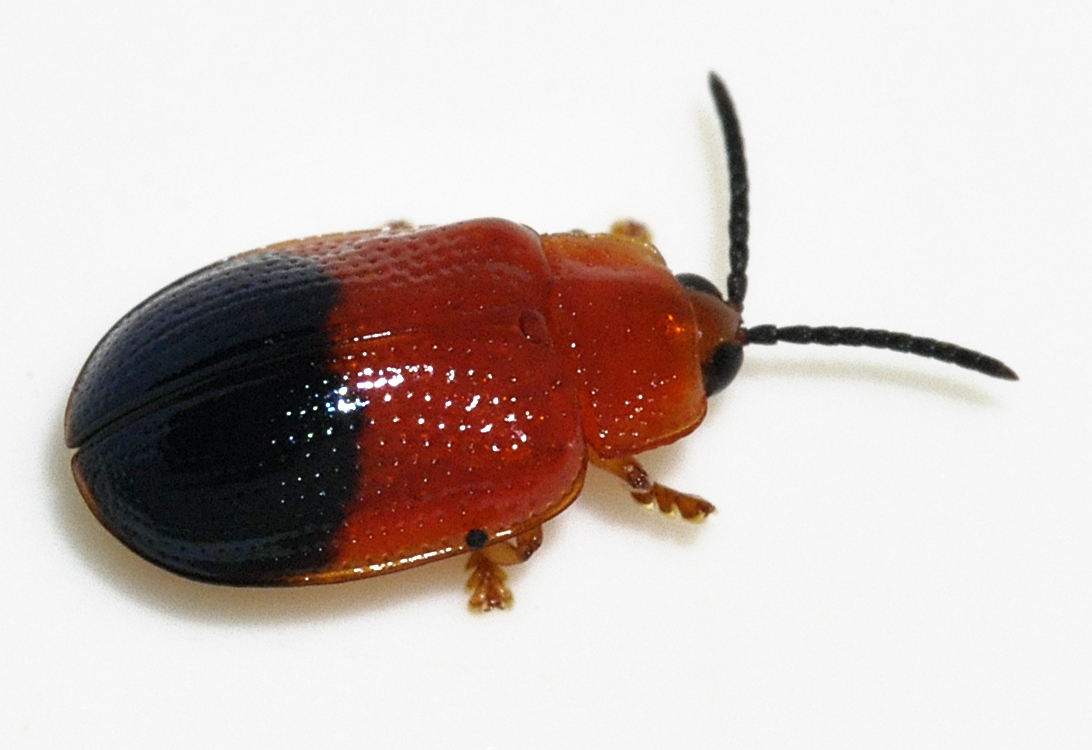

Scientific classification
- Kingdom: Animalia
- Phylum: Arthropoda
- Clade: Pancrustacea
- Class: Insecta
- Order: Coleoptera
- Suborder: Polyphaga
- Infraorder: Cucujiformia
- Family: Chrysomelidae
- Genus: Callispa
- Species: C. elegans

Binomial name
- Callispa elegans Baly, 1876

= Callispa elegans =

Species of beetle

Callispa elegans is a species of tortoise beetles (insects in the subfamily Cassidinae) found in Southern Asia, with records from Indonesia (Java, Sumatra) and Malaysia.

== Biology ==
This species has been recorded feeding on Zalacca conferta, Cyrtostachys lacca, Salacca species, Calamus manan, Calamus caesius, Calamus scipionum, Elaeis guineensis, Caryota mitis, Iguanura geonomiformis, Korthalsia rigida, Korthalsia rostrata, Pinanga disticha and Pinanga scortechinii.
