= Callispa keram =

Scientific classification
- Kingdom: Animalia
- Phylum: Arthropoda
- Class: Insecta
- Order: Coleoptera
- Suborder: Polyphaga
- Infraorder: Cucujiformia
- Family: Chrysomelidae
- Genus: Callispa
- Species: C. keram

Binomial name
- Callispa keram Shameem & Prathapan, 2013

Species of beetle

Callispa keram is a species of beetle in the family Chrysomelidae. It is found in India.

== Biology ==
Adults have been found feeding on Cocos nucifera, Livistona chinensis and Syagrus romanzoffiana.
