= Callispa fallax =

Scientific classification
- Kingdom: Animalia
- Phylum: Arthropoda
- Class: Insecta
- Order: Coleoptera
- Suborder: Polyphaga
- Infraorder: Cucujiformia
- Family: Chrysomelidae
- Genus: Callispa
- Species: C. fallax

Binomial name
- Callispa fallax Uhmann, 1930

Species of beetle

Callispa fallax is a species of beetle of the family Chrysomelidae. It is found in the Philippines (Luzon, Mindanao).
