= Gogana conwayi =

Scientific classification
- Kingdom: Animalia
- Phylum: Arthropoda
- Clade: Pancrustacea
- Class: Insecta
- Order: Lepidoptera
- Family: Drepanidae
- Genus: Gogana
- Species: G. conwayi

Binomial name
- Gogana conwayi (Holloway, 1976)

Synonyms
- Ametroptila conwayi Holloway, 1976

Species of hook-tip moth

Gogana conwayi is a moth species in the family Drepanidae, first described by Jeremy Daniel Holloway in 1976. It is found on Borneo, at Mount Kinabalu. The species is known from only four specimens.

== Appearance ==
Gogana conwayi is a pale yellow in color with fine brown banding on the wings. It somewhat resembles Euphalacra semisecta, but differs in size and shape of the hindwings.

== Original publication ==
Holloway, Jeremy Daniel (1976). Moths of Borneo with special reference to Mt. Kinabalu. p. 94. (as Ametroptila conwayi).
