= Callispa fortunii =

Scientific classification
- Kingdom: Animalia
- Phylum: Arthropoda
- Clade: Pancrustacea
- Class: Insecta
- Order: Coleoptera
- Suborder: Polyphaga
- Infraorder: Cucujiformia
- Family: Chrysomelidae
- Genus: Callispa
- Species: C. fortunii

Binomial name
- Callispa fortunii Baly, 1858

Synonyms
- Callispa fortunii emarginata Gressitt, 1938; Callispa ruficeps Pic, 1929

Species of beetle

Callispa fortunii is a species of beetle of the family Chrysomelidae. It is found in China (Anhui, Zhejiang, Fukien, Guangdong, Hainan, Jiangxi, Jiangxi) and Vietnam.

== Description ==
Adults are oblong-elongate and shining testaceous, while the elytra are bright metallic blue and the antennae are black, with their basal joint obscure rufous.

== Biology ==
This species has been recorded feeding on Bambusa species.
