= Callispa insignis =

Scientific classification
- Kingdom: Animalia
- Phylum: Arthropoda
- Class: Insecta
- Order: Coleoptera
- Suborder: Polyphaga
- Infraorder: Cucujiformia
- Family: Chrysomelidae
- Genus: Callispa
- Species: C. insignis

Binomial name
- Callispa insignis Baly, 1858

Species of beetle

Callispa insignis is a species of beetle in the family Chrysomelidae. It is found in India (Meghalaya, northern India).

== Description ==
Adults are quadrate-oblong and shining black, the thorax narrowly edged on the sides with piceous. The elytra are bright metallic blue and the body is rufo-fulvous beneath. The head is smooth, shining, convex above, produced in front into an acute tooth, which scarcely conceals the insertion of the antennae, its apex forming the upper termination of a narrow ridge running down the middle of the face. The thorax is transverse, three times as broad as long, slightly emarginate in front, the sides dilated, nearly straight behind, rounded anteriorly, narrowly margined, the surface convex, concave and coarsely punctured on the sides. The disc with a few scattered punctures. The scutellum is impunctate, its apex obtuse. The elytra are broadly oblong and scarcely wider than the base of the thorax, the sides slightly curved, subparallel, their margin dilated, deflexed, the apex regularly rounded, above moderately convex, somewhat flattened along the suture, punctate-striate, puncturing less deeply impressed towards the apex, side margin irregularly punctured.
