= Callispa maindoni =

Scientific classification
- Kingdom: Animalia
- Phylum: Arthropoda
- Class: Insecta
- Order: Coleoptera
- Suborder: Polyphaga
- Infraorder: Cucujiformia
- Family: Chrysomelidae
- Genus: Callispa
- Species: C. maindoni

Binomial name
- Callispa maindoni (Pic, 1943)

Synonyms
- Hispa maindoni Pic, 1943

Species of beetle

Callispa maindoni is a species of beetle of the family Chrysomelidae. It is found in India (Malabar).
