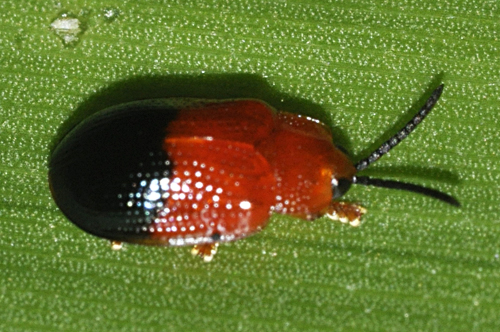
- Callispa elegans

Scientific classification
- Kingdom: Animalia
- Phylum: Arthropoda
- Class: Insecta
- Order: Coleoptera
- Suborder: Polyphaga
- Infraorder: Cucujiformia
- Family: Chrysomelidae
- Subfamily: Cassidinae
- Tribe: Callispini; Chapuis, 1875

Genera
- see text

= Callispini =

Tribe of leaf beetles

Callispini is a tribe of mostly African and Asian leaf beetles within the subfamily Cassidinae; it was erected by Félicien Chapuis in 1875.

== Genera ==
- Amblispa Baly, 1858 - Indian subcontinent and Sri Lanka
- Callispa Baly, 1858 - Africa and Asia
- Hispodonta Baly, 1858 - SE Asia
- Pseudocallispa Uhmann, 1931 - monotypic, Philippines
- †Echinocallispa Zhang et al., 1994
  - † Echinocallispa flavida Zhang et al., 1994, a Miocene fossil described from Shandong, China.
