= Callispa cribrata =

Scientific classification
- Kingdom: Animalia
- Phylum: Arthropoda
- Clade: Pancrustacea
- Class: Insecta
- Order: Coleoptera
- Suborder: Polyphaga
- Infraorder: Cucujiformia
- Family: Chrysomelidae
- Genus: Callispa
- Species: C. cribrata

Binomial name
- Callispa cribrata Gestro, 1896

Species of beetle

Callispa cribrata is a species of beetle of the family Chrysomelidae. It is found in Indonesia (Borneo, Natuna, Sumatra).
