= Callispa brettinghami =

Scientific classification
- Kingdom: Animalia
- Phylum: Arthropoda
- Class: Insecta
- Order: Coleoptera
- Suborder: Polyphaga
- Infraorder: Cucujiformia
- Family: Chrysomelidae
- Genus: Callispa
- Species: C. brettinghami

Binomial name
- Callispa brettinghami Baly, 1869

Synonyms
- Callispa mouhoti Baly, 1869; Callispa delauneyi Fleutiaux, 1887

Species of beetle

Callispa brettinghami is a species of beetle of the family Chrysomelidae. It is found in Cambodia, China (Guangxi, Yunnan), India (Arunachal Pradesh, Sikkim), Laos, Myanmar, Thailand and Vietnam.

== Biology ==
This species has been recorded feeding on Bambusa species, including Bambusa arundinacea.
