= Callispa almora =

Scientific classification
- Kingdom: Animalia
- Phylum: Arthropoda
- Class: Insecta
- Order: Coleoptera
- Suborder: Polyphaga
- Infraorder: Cucujiformia
- Family: Chrysomelidae
- Genus: Callispa
- Species: C. almora

Binomial name
- Callispa almora Maulik, 1923

Synonyms
- Callispa almora nigrimembris Chen & Yu, 1964; Callispa almora fukienica Chen & Yu, 1964

Species of beetle

Callispa almora is a species of beetle of the family Chrysomelidae. It is found in China (Fukien, Szechuan, Yunnan) and India.
