= Callispa umtalina =

Scientific classification
- Kingdom: Animalia
- Phylum: Arthropoda
- Class: Insecta
- Order: Coleoptera
- Suborder: Polyphaga
- Infraorder: Cucujiformia
- Family: Chrysomelidae
- Genus: Callispa
- Species: C. umtalina

Binomial name
- Callispa umtalina Péringuey, 1908

Species of beetle

Callispa umtalina is a species of beetle of the family Chrysomelidae. It is found in Zimbabwe.

== Description ==
Adults reach a length of about 6 mm. They are black and shiny. The prothorax is somewhat broader at the base apex, with slightly arched sides, in the middle barely conjoined, but more flattened towards the sides, in this place covered with foveolate dots, the disc impressed to the middle of the base, and sprinkled with smaller dots on both sides. The scutellum is free of punctures. The elytra are elongate, almost parallel, prothorax a quarter longer, scarcely striated, covered with serial sub-foveolate dots. The body is moderately punctate beneath.
