= Callispa bowringii =

Scientific classification
- Kingdom: Animalia
- Phylum: Arthropoda
- Clade: Pancrustacea
- Class: Insecta
- Order: Coleoptera
- Suborder: Polyphaga
- Infraorder: Cucujiformia
- Family: Chrysomelidae
- Genus: Callispa
- Species: C. bowringii

Binomial name
- Callispa bowringii Baly, 1858

Synonyms
- Callispa bowringi atripes Pic, 1924; Callispa proxima Baly, 1869

Species of beetle

Callispa bowringii is a species of beetle of the family Chrysomelidae. It is found in China (Fukien, Hainan, Hupeh, Kwangtung, Szechuan, Yunnan), Laos, the Philippines, Thailand and Vietnam.

== Description ==
Adults are oblong-ovate, above shining metallic blue. The head is subconvex above, produced into an acute angle in front. The antennae are black and nearly half the length of the body. The thorax is transverse, nearly three times as long as broad at the base, its apex entire, the sides dilated, much narrowed in front, rounded and narrowly marginate, above subconvex, broadly excavated on either side. The disc distantly, the sides rather more closely, covered with deep and somewhat coarse punctures. The scutellum is broad, obtuse, smooth and impunctate. The elytra are oblong, scarcely broader than the base of the thorax, the shoulders suddenly rounded, the sides subparallel, margined, margin moderately dilated, slightly deflexed, the apex rounded, above subconvex, the sides sinuate below the shoulders. The surface is deeply punctate-striate, the puncturing less regular at the sides, and less strongly marked towards the apex. The body is shining black beneath, with the legs and abdomen rufo-fulvous.

== Biology ==
This species has been recorded feeding on Bambusa arundinacea, Bambusa beecheyana, Bambusa glaucescens, Bambusa oldahmi, Bambusa muliplex, Bambusa sinospinosa, Bambusa tuldoides, Dendrocalamis latiflorus, Phyllostachys aurea, Arundinaria species, Lingnania chungii, Lingnania cerosissima, Sinobambusa tootsik and Sinocalamus beecheyanus.
