= Callispa sundara =

Scientific classification
- Kingdom: Animalia
- Phylum: Arthropoda
- Class: Insecta
- Order: Coleoptera
- Suborder: Polyphaga
- Infraorder: Cucujiformia
- Family: Chrysomelidae
- Genus: Callispa
- Species: C. sundara

Binomial name
- Callispa sundara Maulik, 1919

Synonyms
- Callispa elongata Pic, 1924

Species of beetle

Callispa sundara is a species of beetle of the family Chrysomelidae. It is found in China (Guangxi, Hainan, Yunnan), Laos, Myanmar, Thailand and Vietnam.
