= Callispa montivaga =

Scientific classification
- Kingdom: Animalia
- Phylum: Arthropoda
- Class: Insecta
- Order: Coleoptera
- Suborder: Polyphaga
- Infraorder: Cucujiformia
- Family: Chrysomelidae
- Genus: Callispa
- Species: C. montivaga

Binomial name
- Callispa montivaga Maulik, 1919

Species of beetle

Callispa montivaga is a species of beetle of the family Chrysomelidae. It is found in India (Assam), Malaysia and Nepal.

== Biology ==
This species has been found feeding on Bambusa arundinacea.
