= Callispa bayoni =

Scientific classification
- Kingdom: Animalia
- Phylum: Arthropoda
- Class: Insecta
- Order: Coleoptera
- Suborder: Polyphaga
- Infraorder: Cucujiformia
- Family: Chrysomelidae
- Genus: Callispa
- Species: C. bayoni

Binomial name
- Callispa bayoni Gestro, 1911

Synonyms
- Callispa schoutedeni Uhmann, 1931

Species of beetle

Callispa bayoni is a species of beetle of the family Chrysomelidae. It is found in Cameroon, Congo, Mozambique, Rwanda and Uganda.
