= Amblispa dohrnii =

Scientific classification
- Kingdom: Animalia
- Phylum: Arthropoda
- Class: Insecta
- Order: Coleoptera
- Suborder: Polyphaga
- Infraorder: Cucujiformia
- Family: Chrysomelidae
- Genus: Amblispa
- Species: A. dohrnii

Binomial name
- Amblispa dohrnii Baly, 1858

Species of beetle

Amblispa dohrnii, is a species of leaf beetle found in Sri Lanka.

== Description ==
Adults are elongate, convex above and shining black, while the head and thorax are bright red and the elytra are brassy green.
