= Callispa limbata =

Scientific classification
- Kingdom: Animalia
- Phylum: Arthropoda
- Clade: Pancrustacea
- Class: Insecta
- Order: Coleoptera
- Suborder: Polyphaga
- Infraorder: Cucujiformia
- Family: Chrysomelidae
- Genus: Callispa
- Species: C. limbata

Binomial name
- Callispa limbata Gestro, 1906

Species of beetle

Callispa limbata is a species of beetle of the family Chrysomelidae. It is found in Cameroon and on Bioko.
