= Callispa natalensis =

Scientific classification
- Kingdom: Animalia
- Phylum: Arthropoda
- Class: Insecta
- Order: Coleoptera
- Suborder: Polyphaga
- Infraorder: Cucujiformia
- Family: Chrysomelidae
- Genus: Callispa
- Species: C. natalensis

Binomial name
- Callispa natalensis Baly, 1858

Species of beetle

Callispa natalensis is a species of beetle of the family Chrysomelidae. It is found in South Africa.

== Description ==
Adults are elongate, moderately convex and shining black. The head and thorax are bright testaceous red and the knees and tarsi are rufo-piceous.
