= Callispa duodecimaculata =

Scientific classification
- Kingdom: Animalia
- Phylum: Arthropoda
- Clade: Pancrustacea
- Class: Insecta
- Order: Coleoptera
- Suborder: Polyphaga
- Infraorder: Cucujiformia
- Family: Chrysomelidae
- Genus: Callispa
- Species: C. duodecimaculata

Binomial name
- Callispa duodecimaculata Chapuis, 1876

Synonyms
- Callispa duodecimaculata confluens Leefmans, 1931

Species of beetle

Callispa duodecimaculata is a species of beetle of the family Chrysomelidae. It is found in India (Bombay), Indonesia (Java, Sumatra), the Philippines (Bohol) and Thailand.

== Biology ==
This species has been recorded feeding on Spathoglottis plicata.
