= Gogana carnosa =

Scientific classification
- Kingdom: Animalia
- Phylum: Arthropoda
- Class: Insecta
- Order: Lepidoptera
- Family: Drepanidae
- Genus: Gogana
- Species: G. carnosa

Binomial name
- Gogana carnosa (Swinhoe, 1895)

Synonyms
- Phalacropsis carnosa Swinhoe, 1895; Liocrops carnosa Swinhoe, 1895

Species of hook-tip moth

Gogana carnosa is a moth in the family Drepanidae first described by Charles Swinhoe in 1895. It is found in the Khasi Hills of India.

Adults are ochreous-flesh colour (ochreous mixed with the idealized colour of the skin of British people in 1895), suffused with grey on the wings, both wings crossed by many sinuous, very fine and indistinct brown lines and with scattered black points. The outermost line is most distinct and black marked and there is a black cell-spot on the hindwings.
