= Callispa philippinica =

Scientific classification
- Kingdom: Animalia
- Phylum: Arthropoda
- Class: Insecta
- Order: Coleoptera
- Suborder: Polyphaga
- Infraorder: Cucujiformia
- Family: Chrysomelidae
- Genus: Callispa
- Species: C. philippinica

Binomial name
- Callispa philippinica Uhmann, 1931

Synonyms
- Callispa nigricornis Gestro, 1917 (not Baly)

Species of beetle

Callispa philippinica is a species of beetle of the family Chrysomelidae. It is found in the Philippines (Mindanao).
