= Gogana bornormalis =

Scientific classification
- Kingdom: Animalia
- Phylum: Arthropoda
- Clade: Pancrustacea
- Class: Insecta
- Order: Lepidoptera
- Family: Drepanidae
- Genus: Gogana
- Species: G. bornormalis

Binomial name
- Gogana bornormalis Holloway, 1998

Species of hook-tip moth

Gogana bornormalis is a moth in the family Drepanidae first described by Jeremy Daniel Holloway in 1998. It is found on Borneo.
