= Callispa amabilis =

Scientific classification
- Kingdom: Animalia
- Phylum: Arthropoda
- Clade: Pancrustacea
- Class: Insecta
- Order: Coleoptera
- Suborder: Polyphaga
- Infraorder: Cucujiformia
- Family: Chrysomelidae
- Genus: Callispa
- Species: C. amabilis

Binomial name
- Callispa amabilis Gestro, 1910

Species of beetle

Callispa amabilis is a species of beetle of the family Chrysomelidae. It is found in China (Yunnan), Indonesia (Java, Sumatra) and Malaysia.
