= Callispa undulata =

Scientific classification
- Kingdom: Animalia
- Phylum: Arthropoda
- Class: Insecta
- Order: Coleoptera
- Suborder: Polyphaga
- Infraorder: Cucujiformia
- Family: Chrysomelidae
- Genus: Callispa
- Species: C. undulata

Binomial name
- Callispa undulata Uhmann, 1933

Species of beetle

Callispa undulata is a species of beetle of the family Chrysomelidae. It is found in the Philippines (Luzon, Mindanao, Panaon, Samar, Siargao).
