= Callispa andrewesi =

Scientific classification
- Kingdom: Animalia
- Phylum: Arthropoda
- Class: Insecta
- Order: Coleoptera
- Suborder: Polyphaga
- Infraorder: Cucujiformia
- Family: Chrysomelidae
- Genus: Callispa
- Species: C. andrewesi

Binomial name
- Callispa andrewesi (Weise, 1897)

Synonyms
- Melispa andrewesi Weise, 1897

Species of beetle

Callispa andrewesi is a species of beetle of the family Chrysomelidae. It is found in India (Madras).
