= Gogana cottrillii =

Scientific classification
- Kingdom: Animalia
- Phylum: Arthropoda
- Clade: Pancrustacea
- Class: Insecta
- Order: Lepidoptera
- Family: Drepanidae
- Genus: Gogana
- Species: G. cottrillii

Binomial name
- Gogana cottrillii (Holloway, 1976)

Synonyms
- Ametroptila cottrillii Holloway, 1976

Species of hook-tip moth

Gogana cottrillii is a moth in the family Drepanidae first described by Jeremy Daniel Holloway in 1976. It is found on Borneo and Peninsular Malaysia.
