= Gogana turbinifera =

Scientific classification
- Kingdom: Animalia
- Phylum: Arthropoda
- Clade: Pancrustacea
- Class: Insecta
- Order: Lepidoptera
- Family: Drepanidae
- Genus: Gogana
- Species: G. turbinifera

Binomial name
- Gogana turbinifera (Warren, 1922)

Synonyms
- Ametroptila turbinifera Warren, 1922

Species of hook-tip moth

Gogana turbinifera is a moth in the family Drepanidae first described by Warren in 1922. It is found on Borneo and possibly Peninsular Malaysia.
