= Callispa apicalis =

Scientific classification
- Kingdom: Animalia
- Phylum: Arthropoda
- Class: Insecta
- Order: Coleoptera
- Suborder: Polyphaga
- Infraorder: Cucujiformia
- Family: Chrysomelidae
- Genus: Callispa
- Species: C. apicalis

Binomial name
- Callispa apicalis Pic, 1924

Species of beetle

Callispa apicalis is a species of beetle of the family Chrysomelidae. It is found in China (Chekiang, Fukien, Hunan, Kiangsu).
