= Callispa quadricollis =

Scientific classification
- Kingdom: Animalia
- Phylum: Arthropoda
- Class: Insecta
- Order: Coleoptera
- Suborder: Polyphaga
- Infraorder: Cucujiformia
- Family: Chrysomelidae
- Genus: Callispa
- Species: C. quadricollis

Binomial name
- Callispa quadricollis Yu & Li, 2002

Species of beetle

Callispa quadricollis is a species of beetle of the family Chrysomelidae. It is found in China (Hainan).
