= Callispa jaya =

Scientific classification
- Kingdom: Animalia
- Phylum: Arthropoda
- Class: Insecta
- Order: Coleoptera
- Suborder: Polyphaga
- Infraorder: Cucujiformia
- Family: Chrysomelidae
- Genus: Callispa
- Species: C. jaya

Binomial name
- Callispa jaya Basu, 1999

Species of beetle

Callispa jaya is a species of beetle in the family Chrysomelidae. It is found in India (West Bengal).
