= Callispa vittata =

Scientific classification
- Kingdom: Animalia
- Phylum: Arthropoda
- Clade: Pancrustacea
- Class: Insecta
- Order: Coleoptera
- Suborder: Polyphaga
- Infraorder: Cucujiformia
- Family: Chrysomelidae
- Genus: Callispa
- Species: C. vittata

Binomial name
- Callispa vittata Baly, 1858

Species of beetle

Callispa vittata is a species of beetle of the family Chrysomelidae. It is found in India (Karnataka, Tamil Nadu, West Bengal).

== Description ==
Adults are elongate, moderately convex, slightly flattened along the suture and pale shining fulvous.

== Biology ==
This species has been found feeding on Saccharum barberi, Saccharum officinarum, Saccharum robustum, Saccharum sinense and Erianthus species.
