= Callispa roepkei =

Scientific classification
- Kingdom: Animalia
- Phylum: Arthropoda
- Clade: Pancrustacea
- Class: Insecta
- Order: Coleoptera
- Suborder: Polyphaga
- Infraorder: Cucujiformia
- Family: Chrysomelidae
- Genus: Callispa
- Species: C. roepkei

Binomial name
- Callispa roepkei Uhmann, 1929

Species of beetle

Callispa roepkei is a species of beetle of the family Chrysomelidae. It is found in Indonesia (Java).

== Biology ==
This species has been found feeding on Metroxylon species.
