= Callispa nigricornis =

Scientific classification
- Kingdom: Animalia
- Phylum: Arthropoda
- Class: Insecta
- Order: Coleoptera
- Suborder: Polyphaga
- Infraorder: Cucujiformia
- Family: Chrysomelidae
- Genus: Callispa
- Species: C. nigricornis

Binomial name
- Callispa nigricornis Baly, 1858

Species of beetle

Callispa nigricornis, is a species of leaf beetle found in Sri Lanka.

== Description ==
Body length is about 4.50 to 4.80 mm. Adults are narrowly oblong-ovate, moderately convex, subdepressed along the suture and pale shining fulvous.
