= Callispa houjayi =

Scientific classification
- Kingdom: Animalia
- Phylum: Arthropoda
- Class: Insecta
- Order: Coleoptera
- Suborder: Polyphaga
- Infraorder: Cucujiformia
- Family: Chrysomelidae
- Genus: Callispa
- Species: C. houjayi

Binomial name
- Callispa houjayi Lee, Świętojańska, & Staines, 2012

Species of beetle

Callispa houjayi is a species of beetle of the family Chrysomelidae. It is found in Taiwan.

== Biology ==
Adults have been found on the leaves of Carex sociata.
