= Callispa boettcheri =

Scientific classification
- Kingdom: Animalia
- Phylum: Arthropoda
- Class: Insecta
- Order: Coleoptera
- Suborder: Polyphaga
- Infraorder: Cucujiformia
- Family: Chrysomelidae
- Genus: Callispa
- Species: C. boettcheri

Binomial name
- Callispa boettcheri Uhmann, 1931

Species of beetle

Callispa boettcheri is a species of beetle of the family Chrysomelidae. It is found in the Philippines (Mindoro).
