= Callispa hessei =

Scientific classification
- Kingdom: Animalia
- Phylum: Arthropoda
- Clade: Pancrustacea
- Class: Insecta
- Order: Coleoptera
- Suborder: Polyphaga
- Infraorder: Cucujiformia
- Family: Chrysomelidae
- Genus: Callispa
- Species: C. hessei

Binomial name
- Callispa hessei Uhmann, 1934

Species of beetle

Callispa hessei is a species of beetle in the family Chrysomelidae. Described by German entomologist Erich Uhmann in 1934, is known from Mozambique. Three syntype specimens are deposited in the Iziko South African Museum, and one paratype is deposited in the Senckenberg German Entomological Institute.
