= Gogana fragilis =

Scientific classification
- Domain: Eukaryota
- Kingdom: Animalia
- Phylum: Arthropoda
- Class: Insecta
- Order: Lepidoptera
- Family: Drepanidae
- Genus: Gogana
- Species: G. fragilis

Binomial name
- Gogana fragilis (Swinhoe, 1902)

Synonyms
- Trotothyris fragilis Swinhoe, 1902

Species of hook-tip moth

Gogana fragilis is a moth in the family Drepanidae first described by Charles Swinhoe in 1902. It is found on Borneo.

Adults are dark shining grey with a red-brown streak at the end of the cell on the forewings, as well as some minute silvery specks along the costa, in the cell and interspace below the subcostal vein and along the outer margin. The marginal borders of both wings are dark.
