= Gogana ossicolor =

Scientific classification
- Domain: Eukaryota
- Kingdom: Animalia
- Phylum: Arthropoda
- Class: Insecta
- Order: Lepidoptera
- Family: Drepanidae
- Genus: Gogana
- Species: G. ossicolor

Binomial name
- Gogana ossicolor (Warren, 1922)

Synonyms
- Ametroptila ossicolor Warren, 1922

Species of hook-tip moth

Gogana ossicolor is a moth in the family Drepanidae first described by Warren in 1922. It is found on Borneo.
