= Callispa impressa =

Scientific classification
- Kingdom: Animalia
- Phylum: Arthropoda
- Class: Insecta
- Order: Coleoptera
- Suborder: Polyphaga
- Infraorder: Cucujiformia
- Family: Chrysomelidae
- Genus: Callispa
- Species: C. impressa

Binomial name
- Callispa impressa Uhmann, 1942

Species of beetle

Callispa impressa is a species of beetle in the family Chrysomelidae. It is found in the Democratic Republic of the Congo and Rwanda.
