= Callispa testacea =

Scientific classification
- Kingdom: Animalia
- Phylum: Arthropoda
- Class: Insecta
- Order: Coleoptera
- Suborder: Polyphaga
- Infraorder: Cucujiformia
- Family: Chrysomelidae
- Genus: Callispa
- Species: C. testacea

Binomial name
- Callispa testacea Kraatz, 1895

Species of beetle

Callispa testacea is a species of beetle of the family Chrysomelidae. It is found in Cameroon, Congo, Guinea, Togo and Uganda.
