= Callispa tsoui =

Scientific classification
- Kingdom: Animalia
- Phylum: Arthropoda
- Class: Insecta
- Order: Coleoptera
- Suborder: Polyphaga
- Infraorder: Cucujiformia
- Family: Chrysomelidae
- Genus: Callispa
- Species: C. tsoui

Binomial name
- Callispa tsoui Lee, Świętojańska, & Staines, 2012

Species of beetle

Callispa tsoui is a species of beetle of the family Chrysomelidae. It is found in Taiwan.

== Biology ==
This species has been found feeding on Phyllostachys makinoi and Yushania niitakayamensis.
