= Callispa assama =

Scientific classification
- Kingdom: Animalia
- Phylum: Arthropoda
- Class: Insecta
- Order: Coleoptera
- Suborder: Polyphaga
- Infraorder: Cucujiformia
- Family: Chrysomelidae
- Genus: Callispa
- Species: C. assama

Binomial name
- Callispa assama Maulik, 1919

Species of beetle

Callispa assama is a species of beetle of the family Chrysomelidae. It is found in Bangladesh, India (Assam) and Myanmar.
