= Callispa drescheri =

Scientific classification
- Kingdom: Animalia
- Phylum: Arthropoda
- Clade: Pancrustacea
- Class: Insecta
- Order: Coleoptera
- Suborder: Polyphaga
- Infraorder: Cucujiformia
- Family: Chrysomelidae
- Genus: Callispa
- Species: C. drescheri

Binomial name
- Callispa drescheri Uhmann, 1935

Species of beetle

Callispa drescheri is a species of beetle in the family Chrysomelidae. Described by German entomologist Erich Uhmann in 1935, it is found in Indonesia on the island of Java.
