= Callispa tibangana =

Scientific classification
- Kingdom: Animalia
- Phylum: Arthropoda
- Class: Insecta
- Order: Coleoptera
- Suborder: Polyphaga
- Infraorder: Cucujiformia
- Family: Chrysomelidae
- Genus: Callispa
- Species: C. tibangana

Binomial name
- Callispa tibangana Uhmann, 1939

Species of beetle

Callispa tibangana is a species of beetle of the family Chrysomelidae. It is found in Malaysia.
