= Gogana semibrevis =

Scientific classification
- Domain: Eukaryota
- Kingdom: Animalia
- Phylum: Arthropoda
- Class: Insecta
- Order: Lepidoptera
- Family: Drepanidae
- Genus: Gogana
- Species: G. semibrevis

Binomial name
- Gogana semibrevis (Warren, 1901)

Synonyms
- Ametroptila semibrevis Warren, 1901

Species of hook-tip moth

Gogana semibrevis is a moth in the family Drepanidae first described by Warren in 1901. It is found on Borneo and possibly Peninsular Malaysia.

The wingspan is about 26 mm. The forewings are rufous ochreous, dusted with brown and with traces of several brownish lines across the wing. There is a diffuse cloud before the middle, containing a flattened blotch at the end of the cell. The hindwings have traces of lines on the inner margin and a pale costal area.
