= Callispa minima =

Scientific classification
- Kingdom: Animalia
- Phylum: Arthropoda
- Class: Insecta
- Order: Coleoptera
- Suborder: Polyphaga
- Infraorder: Cucujiformia
- Family: Chrysomelidae
- Genus: Callispa
- Species: C. minima

Binomial name
- Callispa minima Gestro, 1902

Species of beetle

Callispa minima, is a species of leaf beetle found in Sri Lanka and India (Kerala).

== Biology ==
This species has been found feeding on Zea mays.
