= Callispa induta =

Scientific classification
- Kingdom: Animalia
- Phylum: Arthropoda
- Class: Insecta
- Order: Coleoptera
- Suborder: Polyphaga
- Infraorder: Cucujiformia
- Family: Chrysomelidae
- Genus: Callispa
- Species: C. induta

Binomial name
- Callispa induta Uhmann, 1930

Species of beetle

Callispa induta is a species of beetle of the family Chrysomelidae. It is found in Indonesia (Sumatra).
