= Callispa maculipennis =

Scientific classification
- Kingdom: Animalia
- Phylum: Arthropoda
- Class: Insecta
- Order: Coleoptera
- Suborder: Polyphaga
- Infraorder: Cucujiformia
- Family: Chrysomelidae
- Genus: Callispa
- Species: C. maculipennis

Binomial name
- Callispa maculipennis Gestro, 1911

Species of beetle

Callispa maculipennis is a species of beetle of the family Chrysomelidae. It is found in India (Madras, Malabar).
