= Callispa flavescens =

Scientific classification
- Kingdom: Animalia
- Phylum: Arthropoda
- Class: Insecta
- Order: Coleoptera
- Suborder: Polyphaga
- Infraorder: Cucujiformia
- Family: Chrysomelidae
- Genus: Callispa
- Species: C. flavescens

Binomial name
- Callispa flavescens Weise, 1891

Synonyms
- Callispa nigricornis Chapuis, 1876; Callispa flavescens arcuata Uhmann, 1930

Species of beetle

Callispa flavescens is a species of beetle of the family Chrysomelidae. It is found in the Philippines (Basilan, Catanduanes, Cebu, Leyte, Luzon, Mindanao, Mindoro, Palawan).

== Biology ==
This species has been recorded feeding on Bambusa blumeana.
