= Callispa errans =

Scientific classification
- Kingdom: Animalia
- Phylum: Arthropoda
- Class: Insecta
- Order: Coleoptera
- Suborder: Polyphaga
- Infraorder: Cucujiformia
- Family: Chrysomelidae
- Genus: Callispa
- Species: C. errans

Binomial name
- Callispa errans Péringuey, 1908

Species of beetle

Callispa errans is a species of beetle of the family Chrysomelidae. It is found in South Africa.

== Description ==
Adults reach a length of about 5-5.5 mm. They are black and shiny. The head and prothorax are entirely black, sometimes with some reddish at the base of the elytra.
