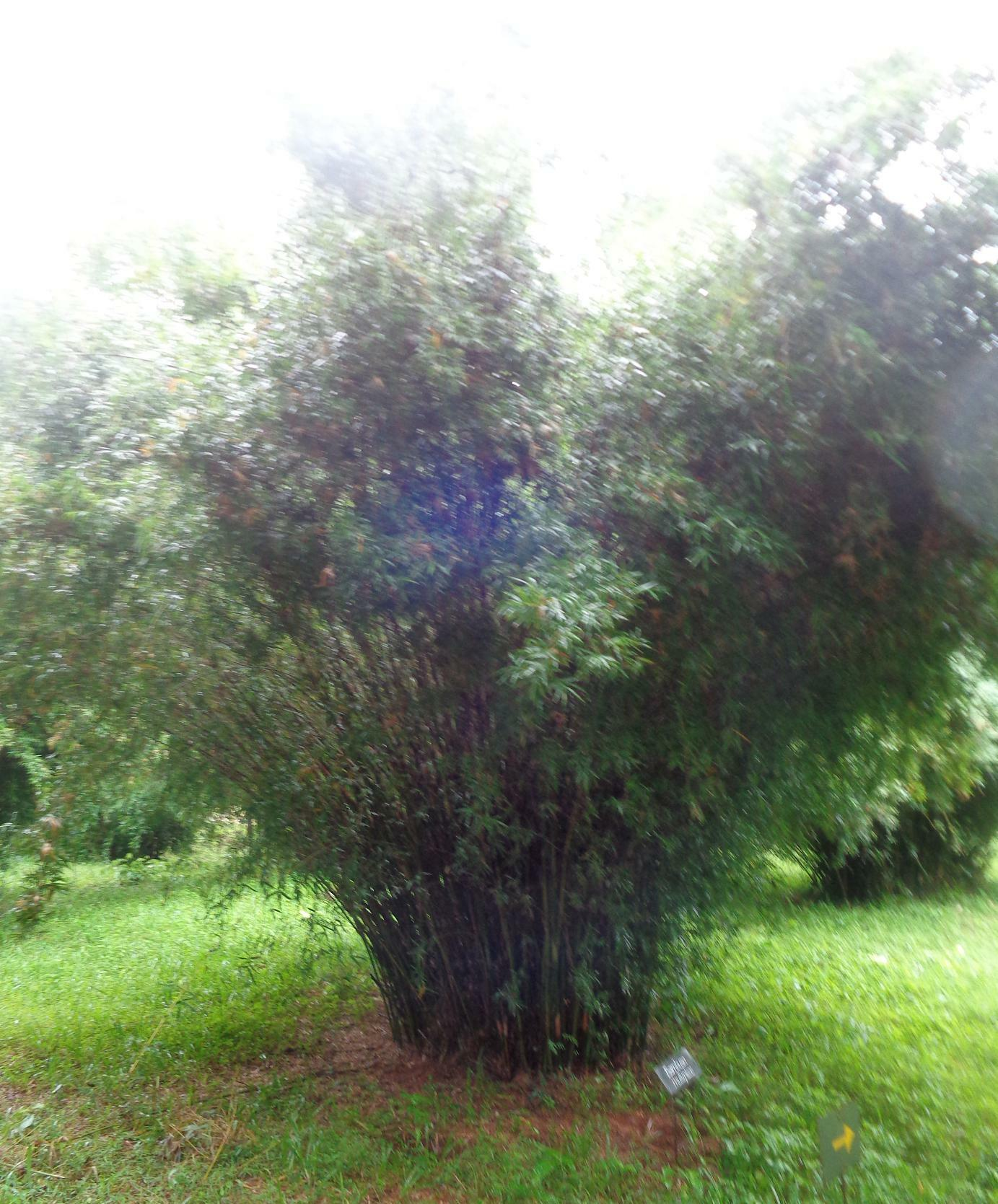
- at Kerala Forest Research Institute; Veluppadam, Kerala, India

Scientific classification
- Kingdom: Plantae
- Clade: Tracheophytes
- Clade: Angiosperms
- Clade: Monocots
- Clade: Commelinids
- Order: Poales
- Family: Poaceae
- Genus: Bambusa
- Species: B. multiplex

Binomial name
- Bambusa multiplex (Lour.) Raeusch. ex Schult.f.

Synonyms
- Homotypic Synonyms: Arundarbor multiplex (Lour.) Kuntze; Arundo multiplex Lour.; Bambusa multiplex var. normalis Sasaki; Heterotypic Synonyms: Arundarbor aurea Kuntze; Arundarbor nana (Roxb.) Kuntze; Arundinaria glaucescens (Willd.) P.Beauv.; Bambos nana (Roxb.) Hitchc. & Chase; Bambusa albifolia T.H.Wen & J.J.Hua; Bambusa alphonse-karrii Mitford ex Satow; Bambusa argentea Nehrl.; Bambusa argentea var. vittata Nehrl.; Bambusa aurea Siebold ex Miq.; Bambusa caesia Siebold & Zucc. ex Munro; Bambusa dolichomerithalla Hayata; Bambusa floribunda f. viridistriata (Makino ex I.Tsuboi) Nakai; Bambusa glaucescens (Willd.) Merr.; Bambusa glaucescens f. albostriata Muroi & Sugim.; Bambusa glaucescens f. albovariegata (Makino) Muroi & Sugim.; Bambusa glaucescens f. alphonso-karrii (Mitford ex Satow) Hatus.; Bambusa glaucescens f. elegans (Koidz.) Muroi & Sugim.; Bambusa glaucescens var. floribunda (Buse) Hatus.; Bambusa glaucescens f. fu-komachi Muroi & Sugim.; Bambusa glaucescens f. gimmei Muroi & Kasahara; Bambusa glaucescens f. kimmei-suhou Muroi & Kasahara; Bambusa glaucescens var. lutea (T.H.Wen) T.H.Wen; Bambusa glaucescens f. midori Muroi & Sugim.; Bambusa glaucescens f. midori-beni Muroi & H.Hamada; Bambusa glaucescens var. pubivagina (W.T.Lin & Z.J.Feng) N.H.Xia; Bambusa glaucescens var. riviereorum (Maire) L.C.Chia & H.L.Fung; Bambusa glaucescens var. shimadae (Hayata) L.C.Chia & But; Bambusa glaucescens f. shirosuji Muroi & H.Okamura; Bambusa glaucescens f. solida (Muroi & Maruy.) Muroi & Sugim.; Bambusa glaucescens f. solida K.J.Mao & C.H.Zhao; Bambusa glaucescens f. tukushi-komachi Muroi & Yu.Tanaka; Bambusa glaucescens f. variegata (E.G.Camus) Muroi & Sugim.; Bambusa glaucescens f. viridistriata (Makino ex I.Tsuboi) Muroi & Sugim.; Bambusa liukiuensis Hayata; Bambusa multiplex f. albovariegata (Makino) Muroi; Bambusa multiplex f. alphonse-karrii (Mitford ex Satow) Nakai; Bambusa multiplex var. elegans (Koidz.) Muroi; Bambusa multiplex var. gracillima (E.G.Camus) Sad.Suzuki; Bambusa multiplex var. incana B.M.Yang; Bambusa multiplex var. lutea T.H.Wen; Bambusa multiplex var. nana (Roxb.) Keng f.; Bambusa multiplex var. pubivagina W.T.Lin & Z.J.Feng; Bambusa multiplex var. riviereorum Maire; Bambusa multiplex var. shimadae (Hayata) Sasaki; Bambusa multiplex f. solida Muroi & Maruy.; Bambusa multiplex var. solida B.M.Yang; Bambusa multiplex var. strigosa (T.H.Wen) Keng f. ex Q.F.Zheng & Y.M.Lin; Bambusa multiplex f. variegata (E.G.Camus) Hatus.; Bambusa multiplex f. viridistriata (Makino ex I.Tsuboi) Muroi; Bambusa nana Roxb.; Bambusa nana f. albovariegata Makino; Bambusa nana var. alphonse-karrii (Mitford ex Satow) Kawam.; Bambusa nana f. alphonse-karrii (Mitford ex Satow) Kawam.; Bambusa nana var. gracillima E.G.Camus; Bambusa nana var. normalis Makino & Shiras.; Bambusa nana var. typica Makino ex I.Tsuboi; Bambusa nana var. variegata E.G.Camus; Bambusa nana f. viridistriata Makino ex I.Tsuboi; Bambusa nana f. vittateargentea Makino ex I.Tsuboi; Bambusa pubivaginata W.T.Lin & Z.M.Wu; Bambusa shimadae Hayata; Bambusa sterilis Kurz ex Miq.; Bambusa strigosa T.H.Wen; Bambusa textilis var. persistens B.M.Yang; Ischurochloa floribunda Buse; Leleba amakusensis Nakai; Leleba dolichomerithalla (Hayata) Nakai; Leleba elegans Koidz.; Leleba floribunda (Buse) Nakai; Leleba floribunda f. viridistriata (Makino ex I.Tsuboi) Nakai; Leleba liukiuensis (Hayata) Nakai; Leleba multiplex f. variegata (E.G.Camus) Nakai; Leleba shimadae (Hayata) Nakai; Ludolfia glaucescens Willd.; Triglossum arundinaceum Gamble

= Bambusa multiplex =

Species of plant

Bambusa multiplex is a species of flowering plant in the family Poaceae.

B. multiplex forms a medium-sized clump with slender culms (stems) and dense foliage. This bamboo is suitable for hedges and live fences since the stems and foliage form a dense growth that create an effective barrier. The height of the stems under ideal conditions is about 10 ft. Propagation is through rhizome offsets and rooted culm (stem) cuttings. Micro propagation too is feasible through axillary bud proliferation.

== Distribution ==
This bamboo native to China (provinces of Guangdong, Guangxi, Hainan, Hunan, Jiangxi, Sichuan, Yunnan), Nepal, Bangladesh, Bhutan, India, Sri Lanka, Taiwan, and northern Indochina. It is also naturalized in Japan, Iraq, Madagascar, Mauritius, Seychelles, Pakistan, parts of South America, the West Indies, and the southeastern United States (Florida, Georgia, Alabama).
