= Orania sylvicola =

Conservation status
- Near Threatened (IUCN 2.3)

Scientific classification
- Kingdom: Plantae
- Clade: Embryophytes
- Clade: Tracheophytes
- Clade: Spermatophytes
- Clade: Angiosperms
- Clade: Monocots
- Clade: Commelinids
- Order: Arecales
- Family: Arecaceae
- Genus: Orania
- Species: O. sylvicola

Binomial name
- Orania sylvicola (Griff.) H.E.Moore

Synonyms
- Macrocladus sylvicola Griff.; Orania macrocladus Mart.

Species of palm

Orania sylvicola is a species of flowering plant in the palm family Arecaceae. It is native to peninsular Thailand, peninsular Malaysia, Singapore, Borneo, Sumatra and Java.
