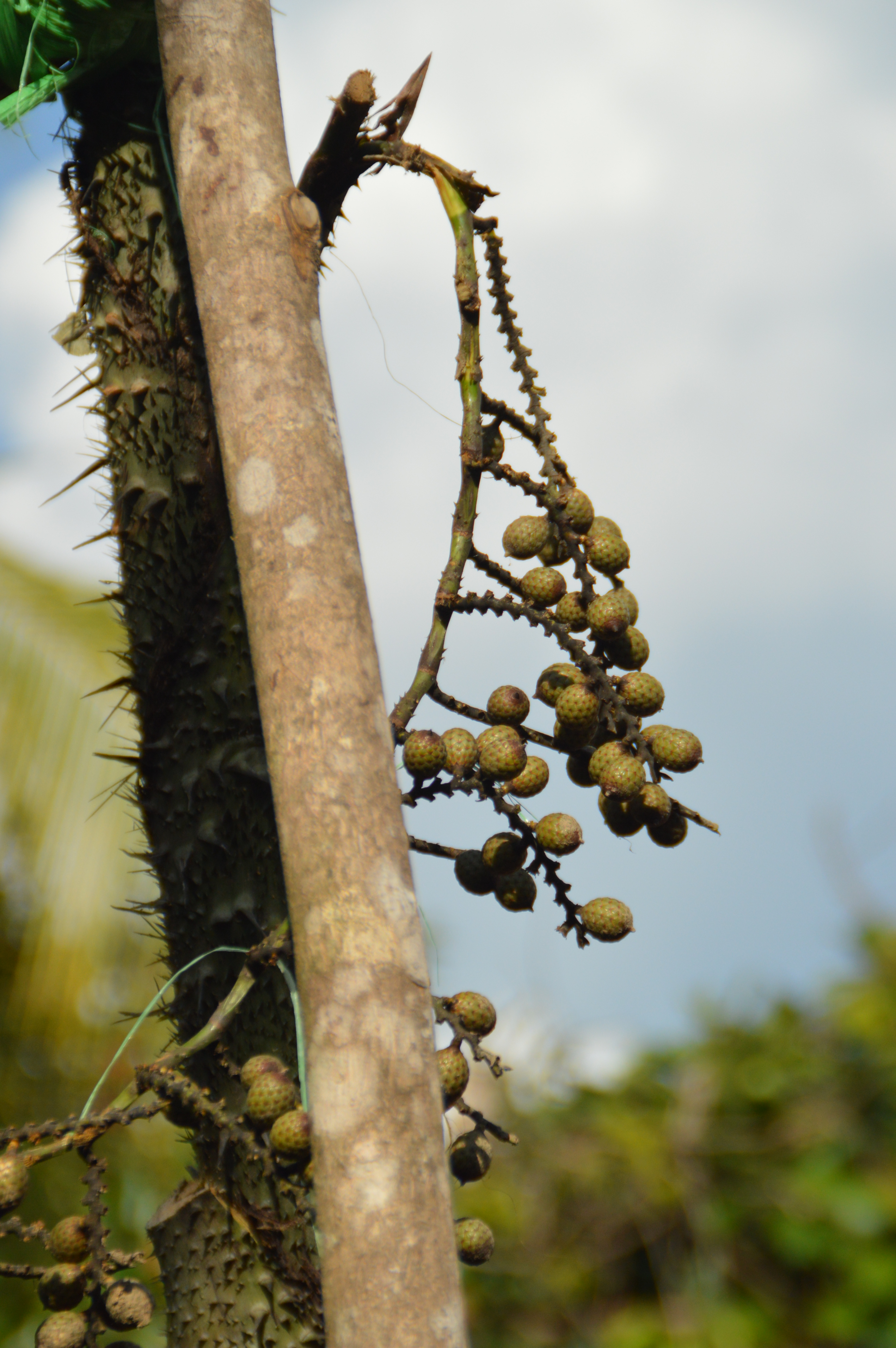

Scientific classification
- Kingdom: Plantae
- Clade: Tracheophytes
- Clade: Angiosperms
- Clade: Monocots
- Clade: Commelinids
- Order: Arecales
- Family: Arecaceae
- Genus: Calamus
- Species: C. manan

Binomial name
- Calamus manan Miq.

Synonyms
- Calamus giganteus Becc.; Palmijuncus manan (Miq.) Kuntze; Rotang manan (Miq.) Baill.

= Calamus manan =

Species of plant

Calamus manan, the manau rattan or rotan manau, is a species of flowering plant in the palm family Arecaceae, native to Thailand, Peninsular Malaysia, Sumatra, and Borneo. A vine, its single stem is widely harvested from the wild for cane furniture-making, leading to an unsustainable population decline. One unbranched stem at Buitenzorg (now Bogor Botanical Gardens), was carefully measured to a length of 240 metres (787 ft).

== Description ==
Calamus manan is a robust, single-stemmed, high-climbing, dioecious rattan species. It produces strong, durable canes that can reach up to 8 cm diameter, with internodes extending to 40 cm in length. The stems can grow over 100 m long, making it one of the longest climbing palms. Growth rates vary, with observations in Sabah indicating potential increases of over 7 m per year, though more commonly, growth ranges from 1–3 m annually.

The leaves are cirrate and can reach up to 8 m in length, including a cirrus extension up to 3 m long. The petiole is short, while the rachis bears up to 45 pairs of lanceolate leaflets, which are irregular in juvenile plants but become more evenly arranged in mature specimens. The leaflets can grow up to 60 cm long and 6 cm wide, with bristly tips.

The inflorescences are large, with male and female structures differing in complexity; male inflorescences are more finely branched, while female inflorescences reach up to 70 cm in length. The fruit is rounded to ovoid, measuring up to 2.8 cm long and 2.0 cm wide, and is covered in 15 vertical rows of yellowish scales with blackish-brown margins. The seeds are ovoid, reaching 1.8 cm in length and 1.2 cm in width, with a finely pitted surface and deeply ruminate endosperm.

The stem, when unsheathed, measures up to 8 cm diameter (specimens up to 13 cm diameter have been reported) but can be as slender as 2.5 cm at the base. The sheaths, reaching up to 11 cm diameter, are dull grey-green and densely armed with black, laminate, hairy-edged triangular spines, arranged in lateral groups or scattered. Thin white wax is present between the spines. The knee is conspicuous and armed similarly to the leaf sheath. The ochrea is ill-defined.

Seedlings have two divergent, cucullate leaflets with a waxy blue-grey bloom on a pale dull green surface.
