= Dendrocalamus =

- Dendrocalamus spp.

Scientific classification
- Kingdom: Plantae
- Clade: Embryophytes
- Clade: Tracheophytes
- Clade: Angiosperms
- Clade: Monocots
- Clade: Commelinids
- Order: Poales
- Family: Poaceae
- Subfamily: Bambusoideae
- Tribe: Bambuseae
- Subtribe: Bambusinae
- Genus: Dendrocalamus; Nees

Type species
- Dendrocalamus strictus (Roxb.) Nees

Synonyms
- Klemachloa R.Parker; Sinocalamus McClure; Sellulocalamus W.T.Lin

Genus of grasses

Dendrocalamus is a tropical Asian genus of giant clumping bamboos in the grass family. It is found in the Indian subcontinent, China, and Southeast Asia.

Dendrocalamus giganteus is one of the tallest of bamboos, capable of reaching heights up to 46 m.

== Species ==
The following are included:

1. Dendrocalamus asper – S China, SE Asia, Indian subcontinent
2. Dendrocalamus bambusoides – Yunnan
3. Dendrocalamus barbatus – Yunnan
4. Dendrocalamus bengkalisensis – Riau Is
5. Dendrocalamus birmanicus – Yunnan, Myanmar
6. Dendrocalamus brandisii – Yunnan, Indochina, Andaman Is
7. Dendrocalamus buar – Sumatra
8. Dendrocalamus calostachyus – Arunachal Pradesh, Bhutan, Yunnan, Myanmar
9. Dendrocalamus cinctus – Sri Lanka
10. Dendrocalamus collettianus – Myanmar
11. Dendrocalamus detinens – Myanmar
12. Dendrocalamus dumosus – Thailand, Peninsular Malaysia
13. Dendrocalamus elegans – Thailand, Peninsular Malaysia
14. Dendrocalamus exauritus – Guangxi
15. Dendrocalamus farinosus – Guangxi, Guizhou, Sichuan, Yunnan, Vietnam
16. Dendrocalamus fugongensis – Yunnan
17. Dendrocalamus giganteus – Yunnan, Assam, West Bengal, Laos, Myanmar; naturalized in Madagascar, Mauritius, Seychelles, Sri Lanka, Bangladesh, Nepal, Cambodia, Thailand, Ecuador, Trinidad, Puerto Rico
18. Dendrocalamus hait – Sumatra
19. Dendrocalamus hamiltonii – Yunnan, Nepal, eastern Himalayas, northern Indochina
20. Dendrocalamus hirtellus – Peninsular Malaysia
21. Dendrocalamus hookeri – eastern Himalayas, Myanmar
22. Dendrocalamus jianshuiensis – Yunnan
23. Dendrocalamus khoonmengii – Thailand
24. Dendrocalamus latiflorus – southern China, northern Indochina; naturalized in Ryukyu Is, Bonin Is, Cuba, Brazil
25. Dendrocalamus liboensis – Guizhou
26. Dendrocalamus longispathus – Indochina, Assam, Bangladesh
27. Dendrocalamus macroculmis – Vietnam
28. Dendrocalamus manipureanus – Manipur
29. Dendrocalamus membranaceus – Indochina, Yunnan, Bangladesh
30. Dendrocalamus menglongensis – Guangdong
31. Dendrocalamus merrillianus – Philippines
32. Dendrocalamus messeri – Myanmar
33. Dendrocalamus minor – Guangdong, Guangxi, Guizhou
34. Dendrocalamus multiflosculus H.N.Nguyen, N.H.Xia & V.T.Nguyen
35. Dendrocalamus nianhei V.T.Nguyen & V.L.Le
36. Dendrocalamus nudus – Thailand
37. Dendrocalamus pachycladus Hsueh, D.Z.Li & C.M.Hui
38. Dendrocalamus pachystachys – Yunnan
39. Dendrocalamus parishii – western Himalayas
40. Dendrocalamus parvigemma – Vietnam
41. Dendrocalamus peculiaris – Yunnan
42. Dendrocalamus pendulus – Peninsular Malaysia
43. Dendrocalamus phuthoensis H.N.Nguyen, V.T.Nguyen & V.L.Le
44. Dendrocalamus poilanei – Vietnam
45. Dendrocalamus pulverulentus – Guangdong
46. Dendrocalamus sahnii – Arunachal Pradesh
47. Dendrocalamus semiscandens – Yunnan
48. Dendrocalamus sericeus – Bihar, Laos, Vietnam
49. Dendrocalamus sikkimensis – Sikkim, Bhutan, Arunachal Pradesh, Yunnan
50. Dendrocalamus sinicus – Yunnan, Laos
51. Dendrocalamus sinuatus – Peninsular Malaysia, Laos, Vietnam
52. Dendrocalamus somdevae – Uttarakhand
53. Dendrocalamus strictus – India, Indochina; naturalized in West Indies, Java, Malaysia, some islands in Indian Ocean
54. Dendrocalamus suberosus – Guangdong
55. Dendrocalamus tibeticus – Tibet, Yunnan
56. Dendrocalamus tomentosus – Yunnan
57. Dendrocalamus triamus – Guangdong
58. Dendrocalamus tsiangii – Sichuan, Guangxi, Guizhou
59. Dendrocalamus wabo – Myanmar
60. Dendrocalamus xishuangbannaensis – Yunnan, Vietnam
61. Dendrocalamus yunnanicus

formerly included

see Ampelocalamus Bambusa Gigantochloa Neololeba Pseudoxytenanthera

- Dendrocalamus affinis – Bambusa emeiensis
- Dendrocalamus balcooa – Bambusa balcooa
- Dendrocalamus copelandii – Bambusa copelandii
- Dendrocalamus criticus – Bambusa pallida
- Dendrocalamus curranii – Gigantochloa levis
- Dendrocalamus factitius – Bambusa sinospinosa var. inermis
- Dendrocalamus forbesii – Neololeba atra
- Dendrocalamus griffithianus – Bambusa griffithiana
- Dendrocalamus inermis – Bambusa sinospinosa var. inermis
- Dendrocalamus latifolius – Neololeba atra
- Dendrocalamus mianningensis – Ampelocalamus mianningensis
- Dendrocalamus microcephalus – Bambusa microcephala
- Dendrocalamus monadelphus – Pseudoxytenanthera monadelpha
- Dendrocalamus multispiculatus – Neololeba atra
- Dendrocalamus papuanus – Neololeba atra
- Dendrocalamus patellaris – Ampelocalamus patellaris
- Dendrocalamus rongchengensis – Bambusa rongchengensis
- Dendrocalamus stenoauritus – Bambusa stenoaurita
- Dendrocalamus stocksii – Pseudoxytenanthera stocksii
- Dendrocalamus tulda – Bambusa tulda
