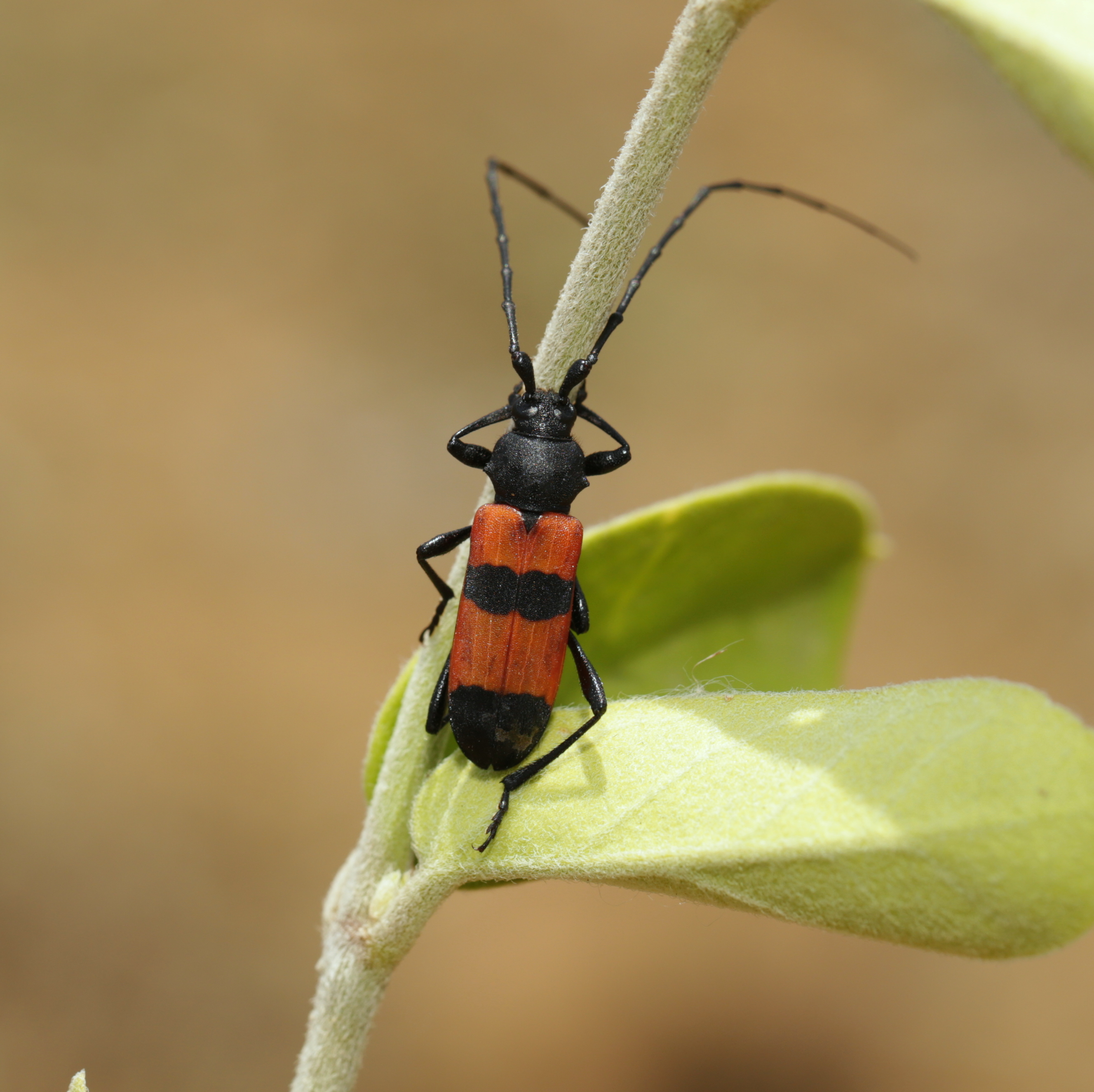

Scientific classification
- Kingdom: Animalia
- Phylum: Arthropoda
- Clade: Pancrustacea
- Class: Insecta
- Order: Coleoptera
- Suborder: Polyphaga
- Infraorder: Cucujiformia
- Family: Cerambycidae
- Genus: Purpuricenus
- Species: P. sanguinolentus

Binomial name
- Purpuricenus sanguinolentus (Olivier, 1795)

Synonyms
- Cerambyx sanguinolentus Olivier, 1795; Philagathes sanguinolentus Lacordaire, 1869; Purpuricenus sanguinolentus Gahan, 190; Purpuricenus chopardi Lepesme, 1947

= Purpuricenus sanguinolentus =

Species of beetle

Purpuricenus sanguinolentus is a species of longhorn beetle native to Sri Lanka and India and possibly in China.

The host plants into which the larvae burrow include Acacia arabica, Bambusa sp., Santalum album, and Dendrocalamus strictus.
