= Itanagar Wildlife Sanctuary =

- IUCN category IV (habitat/species management area)
- Location within Arunachal Pradesh Location within India
- Interactive map of Itanagar Wildlife Sanctuary
- Coordinates: 27°04′06.5″N 93°34′52.9″E
- Area: 140.30 km^{2} (54.17 sq mi)
- Established: 2 February 1978; 48 years ago
- Governing body: Secretary (Environment & Forest), Government of Arunachal Pradesh

The Itanagar wildlife sanctuary was established in 1968 with the aim to conserve the biodiversity around the Itanagar sanctuary. The reserve forest around Itanagar became part of the sanctuary. The sanctuary has geographical boundary limits as River Pam to the east, Pachin in the south, Neorochi on the north-East and the Chingke stream in the north. The terrain is mostly hilly. Since the sanctuary is close to the city, it plays an important role in environmental education.

== Flora ==
The forest can be classified into Tropical Semievergreen and wet evergreen forest. Pure patches of Bamboos are seen intermittently. The most common Bamboo species are Bambusa pallida (Bijuli)and Bambusa hamiltonii (kako). The other tree species are Duabanga grandiflora (Khokan), Amoora wallichi (Aman) Toona ciliata (poma), Magnolia sps (Sopa), Schima wallichi (Makrisal), Castanopsis indica (Hingori).

== Fauna ==
The Itanagar Sanctuary is rich in biodiversity. The animals found in the sanctuary include tiger, leopard, clouded leopard, Asian elephant, gaur, sloth Bear, Barking Deer, marbled cat, capped langur, slow loris. The state bird hornbill is a regular sight in the sanctuary. The white winged duck (Cairina scutolata) is also found.

== Threats to the sanctuary ==
Since the sanctuary is having human population living around, there is a continuous threat from the people who engage in illegal hunting, fishing, fires, grazing, and encroachment on the sanctuary area. The local organisations are demanding denotification of certain portion of the sanctuary due to encrochment.
