= Dactylispa sternalis =

Scientific classification
- Kingdom: Animalia
- Phylum: Arthropoda
- Class: Insecta
- Order: Coleoptera
- Suborder: Polyphaga
- Infraorder: Cucujiformia
- Family: Chrysomelidae
- Genus: Dactylispa
- Species: D. sternalis

Binomial name
- Dactylispa sternalis Chen & Tan, 1964

Species of beetle

Dactylispa sternalis is a species of beetle of the family Chrysomelidae. It is found in China (Guangxi).

== Life history ==
The recorded host plants for this species are Bambusa species.
