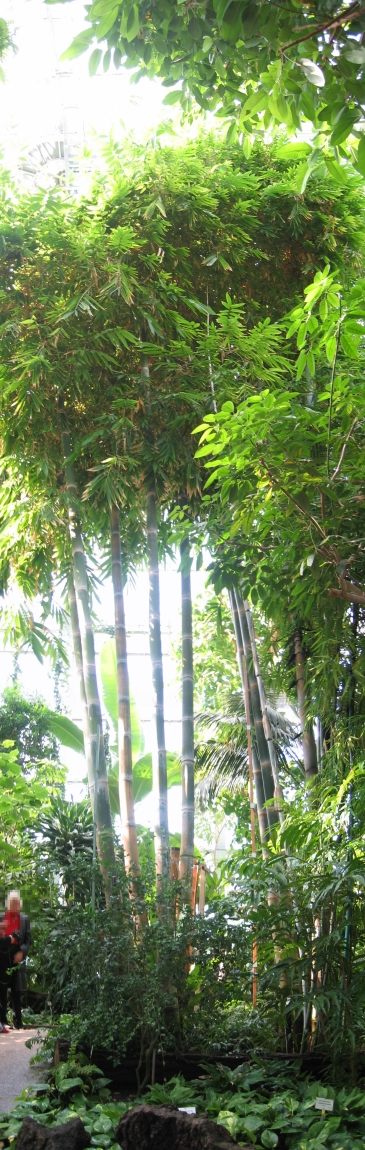
- At Berlin Botanical Garden

Conservation status
- Least Concern (IUCN 3.1)

Scientific classification
- Kingdom: Plantae
- Clade: Embryophytes
- Clade: Tracheophytes
- Clade: Spermatophytes
- Clade: Angiosperms
- Clade: Monocots
- Clade: Commelinids
- Order: Poales
- Family: Poaceae
- Genus: Dendrocalamus
- Species: D. giganteus

Binomial name
- Dendrocalamus giganteus Munro

Synonyms
- Sinocalamus giganteus (Munro) Keng f.

= Dendrocalamus giganteus =

Species of grass

Dendrocalamus giganteus, commonly known as giant bamboo, is a giant tropical and subtropical, dense-clumping species native to mainland Southeast Asia, India, and China's Yunnan province. It is one of the largest bamboo species in the world.

== Description ==
A very tall, large-culmed, greyish-green bamboo, it grows in clumps consisting of a large number of closely growing culms, and typically reaches a height of 30 m (98 ft), but one clump in Arunachal Pradesh, India reached a height of 42 m (138 ft); the culms can also be up to 28 cm (11 in) thick, measurements exceeded only by Dendrocalamus sinicus. Under favourable conditions, it can grow up to 40 cm (16 in) per day. The record for the species, 46 cm (18 in) in 24 hours, was set on July 29–30 of 1903 at Peradeniya Royal Botanical Gardens in Ceylon (Sri Lanka). There have been reports of growth up to 1 m (3 ft 3 in) in 24 hours. In subtropical climates, it does not grow as tall, usually reaching a height of 20 m (66 ft).

The culms are straight, and greyish-green with a powdery appearance, becoming brownish-green on drying, with a smooth surface. The young shoots are blackish purple. Internode length is 25–40 cm, and diameter is 10–35 cm. Culm walls are thin, rarely exceeding 2.5 cm (0.98 in) in thickness branching only at the top. Aerial roots occur up to the eighth node. The rootstock is stout.

The culm sheath is greenish when young, becoming dark brown when mature. Sheaths are large and broad, length of sheath proper 24–30 cm, and width is 40–60 cm. The blade is triangular, 7–10 cm long. The top of the sheath is rounded. Auricles are small, equal, and crisped. The upper surface of the sheath is covered with stiff, gold and brownish hairs. The under surface is glossy, and not hairy. Sheath fall off is early.

== Distribution and habitat ==
Dendrocalamus giganteus is native to India, Myanmar, Thailand and China's Yunnan province. Its habitat is in forests and on river banks, from sea level to 2,000 metres (6,600 ft) altitude.

== Uses ==
Dendrocalamus giganteus is used in construction and weaving. The shoots are edible.
