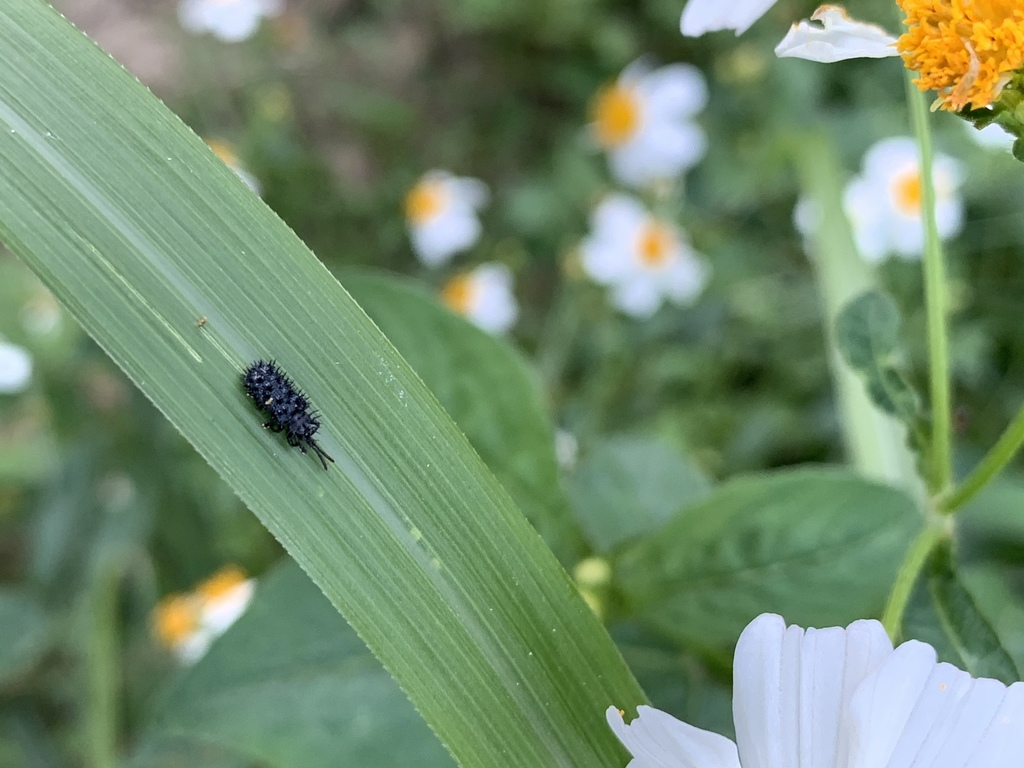

Scientific classification
- Kingdom: Animalia
- Phylum: Arthropoda
- Class: Insecta
- Order: Coleoptera
- Suborder: Polyphaga
- Infraorder: Cucujiformia
- Family: Chrysomelidae
- Genus: Dactylispa
- Species: D. sauteri

Binomial name
- Dactylispa sauteri Uhmann, 1927

Synonyms
- Dactylispa piceomaculata Gressitt, 1939

= Dactylispa sauteri =

Species of beetle

Dactylispa sauteri is a species of beetle of the family Chrysomelidae. It is found in China (Fujian, Hunan, Hubei, Jiangxi, Guangdong) and Taiwan.

== Life history ==
The recorded host plants for this species are Sinocalamus species, Imperata cylindrica and Miscanthus species.
