= Leucopogon pimeleoides =

Scientific classification
- Kingdom: Plantae
- Clade: Tracheophytes
- Clade: Angiosperms
- Clade: Eudicots
- Clade: Asterids
- Order: Ericales
- Family: Ericaceae
- Genus: Leucopogon
- Species: L. pimeleoides

Binomial name
- Leucopogon pimeleoides A.Cunn. ex DC.
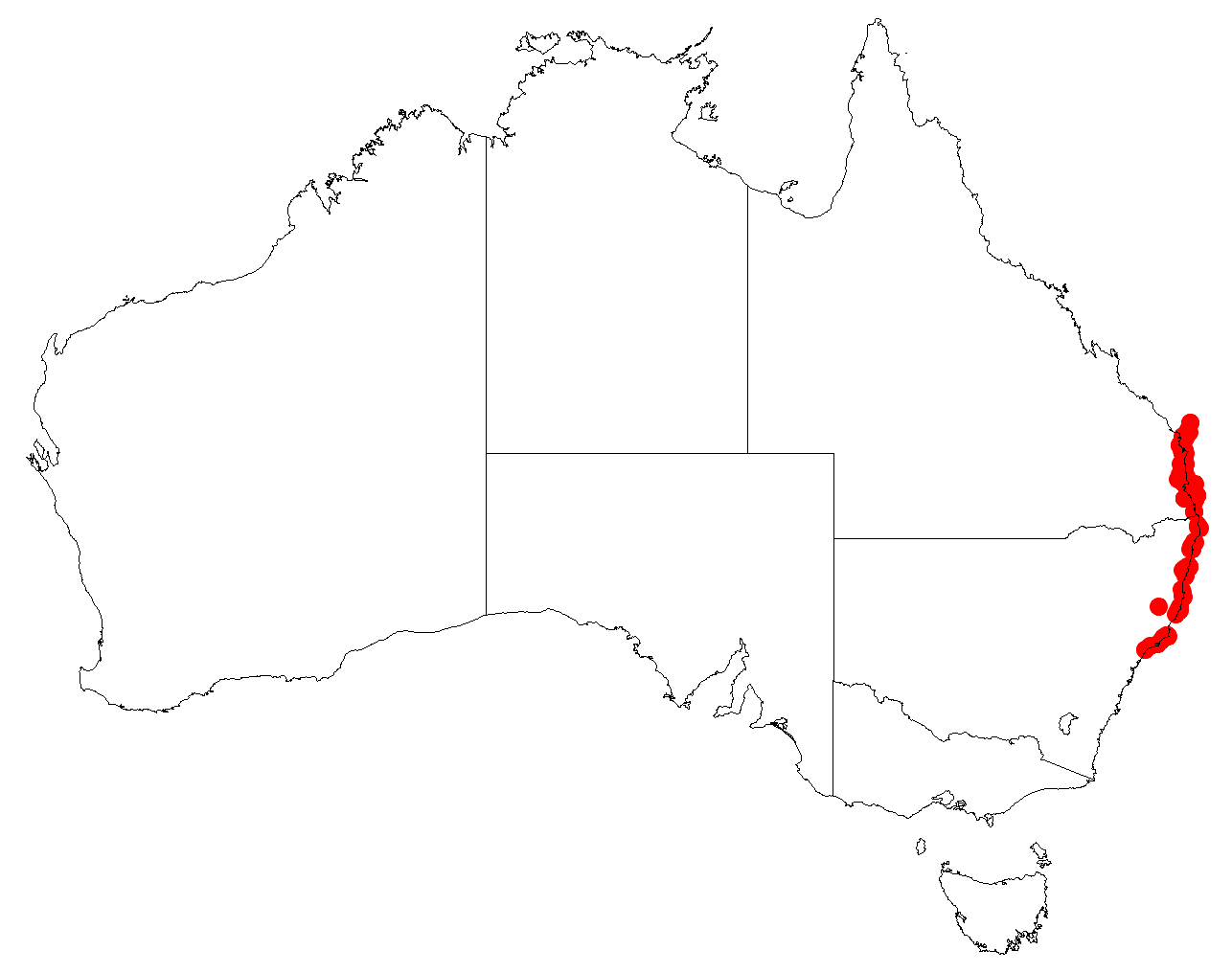
- Occurrence data from AVH

Synonyms
- Leucopogon lanceolatus var. gracilis Benth.; Leucopogon pimelioides A.D.Chapm. orth. var.; Styphelia lanceolata f. gracilis Siebert & Voss; Styphelia lanceolata var. gracilis (Benth.) Maiden & Betche

Species of plant

Leucopogon pimeleoides is a species of flowering plant in the heath family Ericaceae and is endemic to eastern Australia. It is a shrub with narrowly egg-shaped leaves and spikes of white, bearded flowers.

== Description ==
Leucopogon pimeleoides is a shrub with silky-hairy branchlets and narrowly egg-shaped leaves. The flowers are arranged in spikes 3–39 mm (0.12–1.54 in) long with 2 to 16 flowers, with pointed sepals and bracteoles. The petals are white and joined at the base to form a tube that is shorter than the sepals, with bearded lobes.

== Taxonomy ==
Leucopogon pimeleoides was first formally described in 1839 by Augustin Pyramus de Candolle in his Prodromus Systematis Naturalis Regni Vegetabilis from an unpublished description by Allan Cunningham of specimens collected near Stradbroke Island.

The species is listed as Leucopogon lanceolatus var. gracilis by the National Herbarium of New South Wales.

== Distribution and habitat ==
This leucopogon mainly grows in woodland and open forest in near-coastal of south-eastern Queensland and in New South Wales, as far south as Nelson Bay.
