= B. polymorpha =

B. polymorpha may refer to:

- Bambusa polymorpha, a clumping bamboo
- Bouteloua polymorpha, a Grama grass
- Bovista polymorpha, a true puffball
- Bulgaria polymorpha, a fungus found in temperate regions
