= Dactylispa delicatula =

Scientific classification
- Kingdom: Animalia
- Phylum: Arthropoda
- Class: Insecta
- Order: Coleoptera
- Suborder: Polyphaga
- Infraorder: Cucujiformia
- Family: Chrysomelidae
- Genus: Dactylispa
- Species: D. delicatula

Binomial name
- Dactylispa delicatula (Gestro, 1888)

Synonyms
- Hispa delicatula Gestro, 1888; Dactylispa longula Maulik, 1919; Dactylispa (Triplispa) subclathrata Gestro, 1920

Species of beetle

Dactylispa delicatula is a species of beetle of the family Chrysomelidae. It is found in China (Hainan, Hunan, Jiangxi, Guangdong, Sichuan), Laos, Myanmar, Thailand and Vietnam.

== Life history ==
The recorded host plants for this species are Oryza sativa, Bambusa species, Corylus species, Sorbus species and Juglans regia.
