= Bambusa boniopsis =

Scientific classification
- Kingdom: Plantae
- Clade: Tracheophytes
- Clade: Angiosperms
- Clade: Monocots
- Clade: Commelinids
- Order: Poales
- Family: Poaceae
- Genus: Bambusa
- Species: B. boniopsis

Binomial name
- Bambusa boniopsis McClure

Synonyms
- Bambusa fecunda McClure

Species of grass

Bambusa boniopsis is a species of bambooin the family Poaceae.

== Distribution ==
Bambusa boniopsis is endemic to Hainan province of China.
