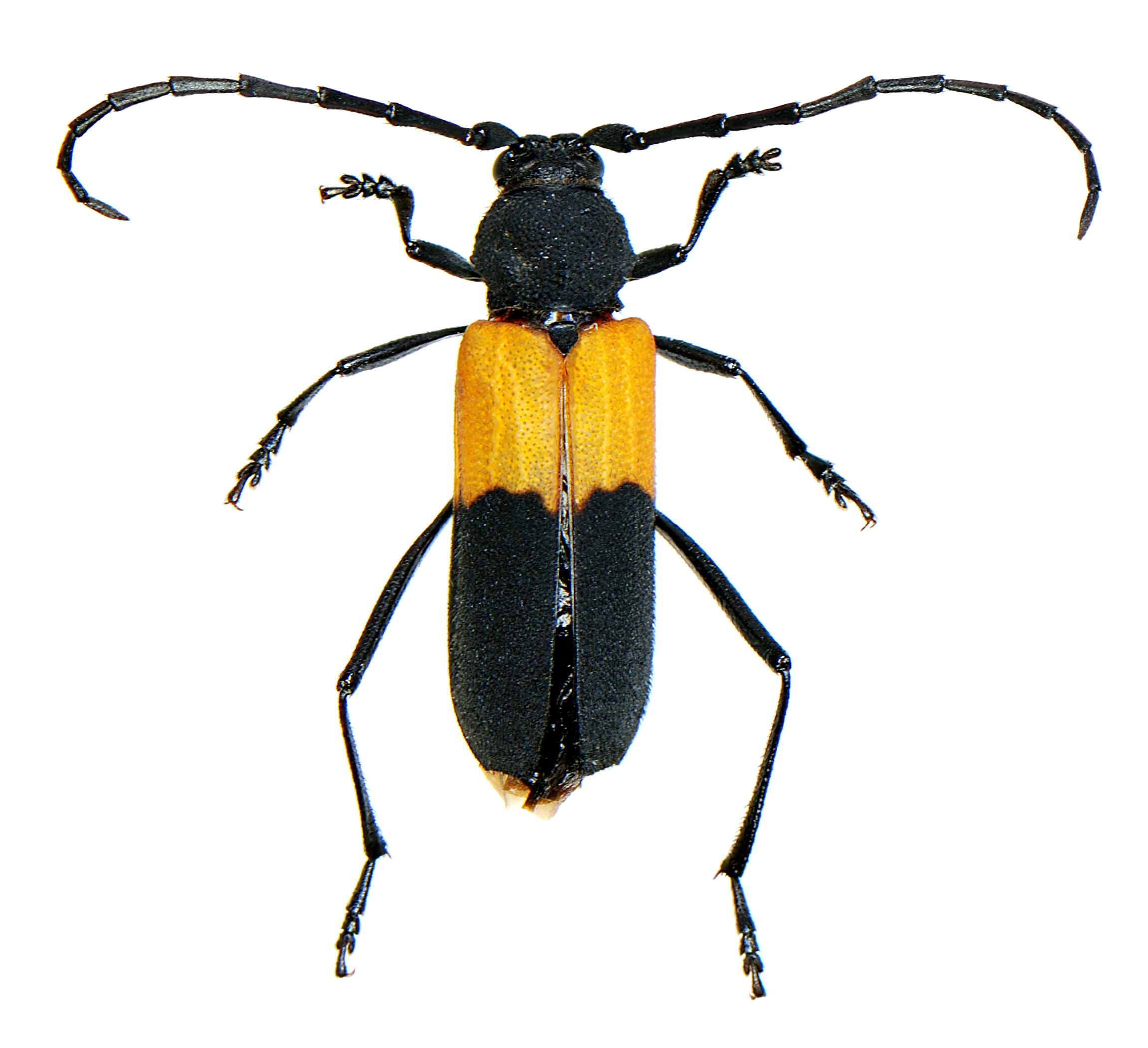

Scientific classification
- Domain: Eukaryota
- Kingdom: Animalia
- Phylum: Arthropoda
- Class: Insecta
- Order: Coleoptera
- Suborder: Polyphaga
- Infraorder: Cucujiformia
- Family: Cerambycidae
- Genus: Purpuricenus
- Species: P. axillaris

Binomial name
- Purpuricenus axillaris Haldeman, 1847

= Purpuricenus axillaris =

Species of beetle

Purpuricenus axillaris is a species of beetle in the family Cerambycidae. It was described by Haldeman in 1847.
