= Bambusa brunneoaciculia =

Scientific classification
- Kingdom: Plantae
- Clade: Tracheophytes
- Clade: Angiosperms
- Clade: Monocots
- Clade: Commelinids
- Order: Poales
- Family: Poaceae
- Genus: Bambusa
- Species: B. brunneoaciculia

Binomial name
- Bambusa brunneoaciculia Guihaia

Species of grass

Bambusa brunneoaciculia is a species of Bambusa bamboo.

== Distribution ==
Bambusa brunneoaciculia is endemic to Hainan province of China.
