= Bambusa comillensis =

Scientific classification
- Kingdom: Plantae
- Clade: Tracheophytes
- Clade: Angiosperms
- Clade: Monocots
- Clade: Commelinids
- Order: Poales
- Family: Poaceae
- Genus: Bambusa
- Species: B. comillensis

Binomial name
- Bambusa comillensis Alam

Species of grass

Bambusa comillensis is a species of Bambusa bamboo.

== Distribution ==
Bambusa comillensis is endemic to Bangladesh.
