= Bambusa arnhemica =

Scientific classification
- Kingdom: Plantae
- Clade: Tracheophytes
- Clade: Angiosperms
- Clade: Monocots
- Clade: Commelinids
- Order: Poales
- Family: Poaceae
- Genus: Bambusa
- Species: B. arnhemica

Binomial name
- Bambusa arnhemica F.Muell.

Species of grass

Bambusa arnhemica is one of three bamboo species native to Australia. It grows in the northwestern areas of the Northern Territory, and is common on riverbanks in Kakadu. Stems turn orange yellow as they harden. Upper stems and branches arch gracefully. It grows to about 8 m in height. It is available from specialist nurseries.

The plant was first described by Ferdinand von Mueller.
