= Neololeba =

Scientific classification
- Kingdom: Plantae
- Clade: Tracheophytes
- Clade: Angiosperms
- Clade: Monocots
- Clade: Commelinids
- Order: Poales
- Family: Poaceae
- Subfamily: Bambusoideae
- Tribe: Bambuseae
- Subtribe: Dinochloinae
- Genus: Neololeba; Widjaja

Type species
- Neololeba atra (Lindl.) Widjaja

Genus of grasses

Neololeba is a tropical Asian, Australian, and Papuasian genus of bamboos in the grass family.

Species

- Neololeba amahussana (Lindl.) Widjaja – Ambon, Seram
- Neololeba atra (Lindl.) Widjaja- Philippines, Sulawesi, Maluku, New Guinea, Bismarck Archipelago, Queensland
- Neololeba glabra Widjaja – western New Guinea
- Neololeba hirsuta (Holttum) Widjaja – New Guinea
- Neololeba inaurita Widjaja – western New Guinea
