= Bambusa clavata =

Scientific classification
- Kingdom: Plantae
- Clade: Tracheophytes
- Clade: Angiosperms
- Clade: Monocots
- Clade: Commelinids
- Order: Poales
- Family: Poaceae
- Genus: Bambusa
- Species: B. clavata

Binomial name
- Bambusa clavata Stapleton

Species of grass

Bambusa clavata is a species of Bambusa bamboo.

== Distribution ==
Bambusa clavata is endemic to Bhutan.

== Description ==
Bambusa clavata grows up to 1000–1200 cm (10-12 m) long till the tip of the culm. It is perennial. Its six stamen are 8–10 mm long. Stigmas are either 2 or 3. Spikelets comprise 5 to 8 florets, diminishing at the apex. Glumes are numerous.
