= Bambusa burmanica =

Scientific classification
- Kingdom: Plantae
- Clade: Tracheophytes
- Clade: Angiosperms
- Clade: Monocots
- Clade: Commelinids
- Order: Poales
- Family: Poaceae
- Genus: Bambusa
- Species: B. burmanica

Binomial name
- Bambusa burmanica Gamble

Species of grass

Bambusa burmanica is a species of Bambusa bamboo.

== Distribution ==
Bambusa burmanica is native to Northeast India, Bangladesh, Yunnan province of China and Peninsular Malaysia.

== Description ==
Bambusa burmanica grows up to height of 1.5 m to 2 m.
