= Bambusa binghamii =

Scientific classification
- Kingdom: Plantae
- Clade: Tracheophytes
- Clade: Angiosperms
- Clade: Monocots
- Clade: Commelinids
- Order: Poales
- Family: Poaceae
- Genus: Bambusa
- Species: B. binghamii

Binomial name
- Bambusa binghamii Gamble

Species of grass

Bambusa binghamii is a species of Bambusa bamboo.

== Distribution ==
Bambusa binghamii is native to Southern Myanmar.

== Description ==
Bambusa binghamii is membranous, veined and ciliate. There are 6 stamen with its tips smooth. There are 3 smooth stigmas.
