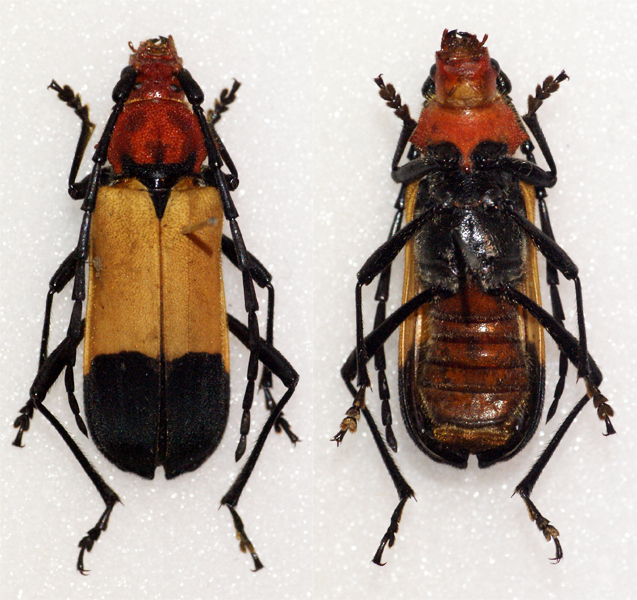
- A female specimen from Mtwara, Tanzania – dorsal and ventral aspects

Scientific classification
- Kingdom: Animalia
- Phylum: Arthropoda
- Class: Insecta
- Order: Coleoptera
- Suborder: Polyphaga
- Infraorder: Cucujiformia
- Family: Cerambycidae
- Genus: Purpuricenus
- Species: P. laetus

Binomial name
- Purpuricenus laetus (Thomson, 1864)

Synonyms
- Philagathes laetus Thomson, 1864

= Purpuricenus laetus =

Species of beetle

Purpuricenus laetus is a species of beetle in the family Cerambycidae.

== Subspecies ==
- Purpuricenus laetus congoanus (Aurivillius, 1911)
- Purpuricenus laetus cubalicus Kuntzen, 1915
- Purpuricenus laetus fuelleborni Kuntzen, 1915
- Purpuricenus laetus glauningi Kuntzen, 1915
- Purpuricenus laetus kambanus Kuntzen, 1915
- Purpuricenus laetus laetus (Thomson, 1864)
- Purpuricenus laetus lengerkeni Kuntzen, 1915
- Purpuricenus laetus machadoi Lepesme, 1947

== Description ==
Purpuricenus laetus can reach a length of about 21–27 millimetres (0.83–1.06 in)

== Distribution ==
This species is present in Angola, Botswana, Democratic Republic of the Congo, Kenya, Mozambique, Namibia, South Africa, Tanzania, Zambia and Zimbabwe.
