= Bambusa farinacea =

Scientific classification
- Kingdom: Plantae
- Clade: Tracheophytes
- Clade: Angiosperms
- Clade: Monocots
- Clade: Commelinids
- Order: Poales
- Family: Poaceae
- Genus: Bambusa
- Species: B. farinacea

Binomial name
- Bambusa farinacea K.M.Wong

Species of grass

Bambusa farinacea is a species of Bambusa bamboo.

== Distribution ==
It is endemic to Ecuador.
