= Bambusa amplexicaulis =

Scientific classification
- Kingdom: Plantae
- Clade: Tracheophytes
- Clade: Angiosperms
- Clade: Monocots
- Clade: Commelinids
- Order: Poales
- Family: Poaceae
- Genus: Bambusa
- Species: B. amplexicaulis

Binomial name
- Bambusa amplexicaulis W.T. Lin & Z.M.Wu

Species of grass

Bambusa amplexicaulis is a species of Bambusa bamboo.

== Distribution ==
The bamboo species is first described in an open field of Xihu Village, of Lianping, Guangdong province, China. It is often found in temperate places in Asia.

== Description ==
It grows up to 300 cm long with its woody stem growing to 25 mm diameter.
