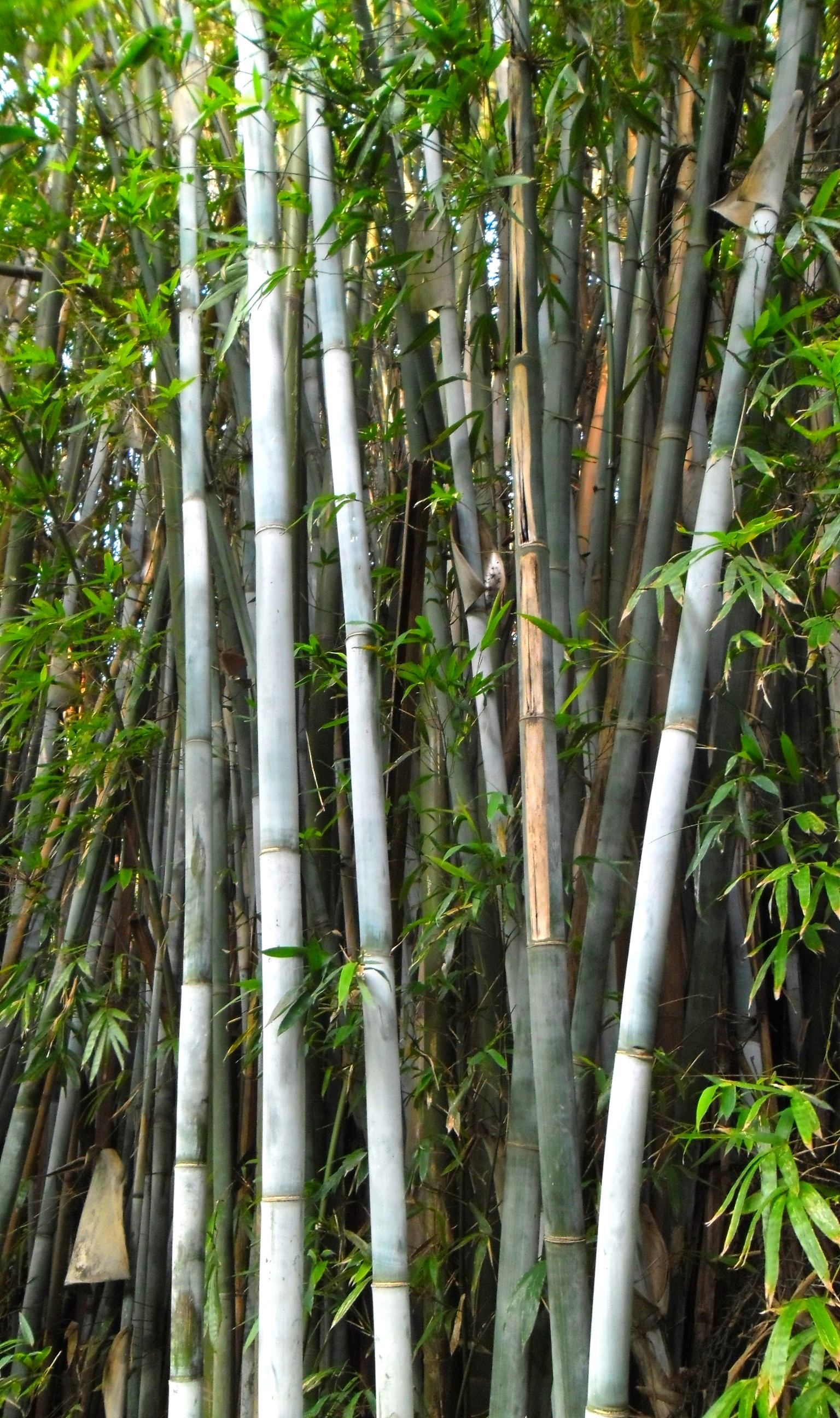
- Bambusa chungii Stalks

Scientific classification
- Kingdom: Plantae
- Clade: Tracheophytes
- Clade: Angiosperms
- Clade: Monocots
- Clade: Commelinids
- Order: Poales
- Family: Poaceae
- Genus: Bambusa
- Species: B. chungii

Binomial name
- Bambusa chungii McClure

Synonyms
- Homotypic Synonyms: Lingnania chungii (McClure) McClure; Heterotypic Synonyms: Bambusa chungii var. barbellata (Q.H.Dai) Y.M.Lin & Q.F.Zheng; Bambusa chungii var. petilla (T.H.Wen) Ohrnb.; Lingnania chungii var. barbellata Q.H.Dai; Lingnania chungii var. petilla T.H.Wen

= Bambusa chungii =

Species of plant

Bambusa chungii, commonly known as white bamboo or tropical blue bamboo, is a large, tall bamboo species in the family Poaceae. It is often found in Hong Kong, and originating in southern China and Vietnam. Its blue-green or white culms often reach a height of 10 m.

== Description ==
The bamboo grove of this species often spreads to 3 m when mature, sometimes spreading to 5 m, often growing in company of trees in a humid, half-sunlight environment. Culms which can grow to a maximum height of 20 m or less are covered in naturally occurring white powder, which are used to waterproof the plant.

The two main types of bamboos are clumpers and running bamboos. Clumping bamboos, such as the B. chungii, are noninvasive bamboos (sympodial or pachymorph). They have short roots and form discrete clumps. Some types of clumping bamboos clump more tightly than others – meaning, the culms (canes) grow closely together, omitting light from being seen through the other side of a mature species. Each new culm that shoots up is larger than the last. Growth rates vary since they depend on soil, water, nutrient, weather conditions, climate, etc. It has been successful growing in Central Florida, some areas of California, and Hawaii.
