= Bambusa gibba =

Scientific classification
- Kingdom: Plantae
- Clade: Tracheophytes
- Clade: Angiosperms
- Clade: Monocots
- Clade: Commelinids
- Order: Poales
- Family: Poaceae
- Genus: Bambusa
- Species: B. gibba

Binomial name
- Bambusa gibba McClure

Species of grass

Bambusa gibba is a species of bamboo in the family Poaceae.

== Distribution ==
Bambusa gibba is endemic from southeast China, especially of Jiangxi province, to northern Vietnam.
