= Bambusa longispiculata =

Scientific classification
- Kingdom: Plantae
- Clade: Tracheophytes
- Clade: Angiosperms
- Clade: Monocots
- Clade: Commelinids
- Order: Poales
- Family: Poaceae
- Genus: Bambusa
- Species: B. longispiculata

Binomial name
- Bambusa longispiculata Gamble

Species of grass

Bambusa longispiculata, or Mahal bamboo, is a species of clumping bamboo native to Bangladesh and Myanmar, but widely grown in many other countries including Australia. Growing in wide and open clumps, it makes an excellent shelter for waterfowl. It is not suited for harvesting and is very suitable for soil stabilization on dam faces. It can grow up to a height of 10 m, and a thickness of 5 cm.
