= Bambusa funghomii =

Scientific classification
- Kingdom: Plantae
- Clade: Tracheophytes
- Clade: Angiosperms
- Clade: Monocots
- Clade: Commelinids
- Order: Poales
- Family: Poaceae
- Genus: Bambusa
- Species: B. funghomii

Binomial name
- Bambusa funghomii McClure

Species of grass

Bambusa funghomii is a species of bamboo in the family Poaceae.

== Distribution ==
Bambusa funghomii is endemic to Henan province, Guangdong province, and Guangxi province of China.
