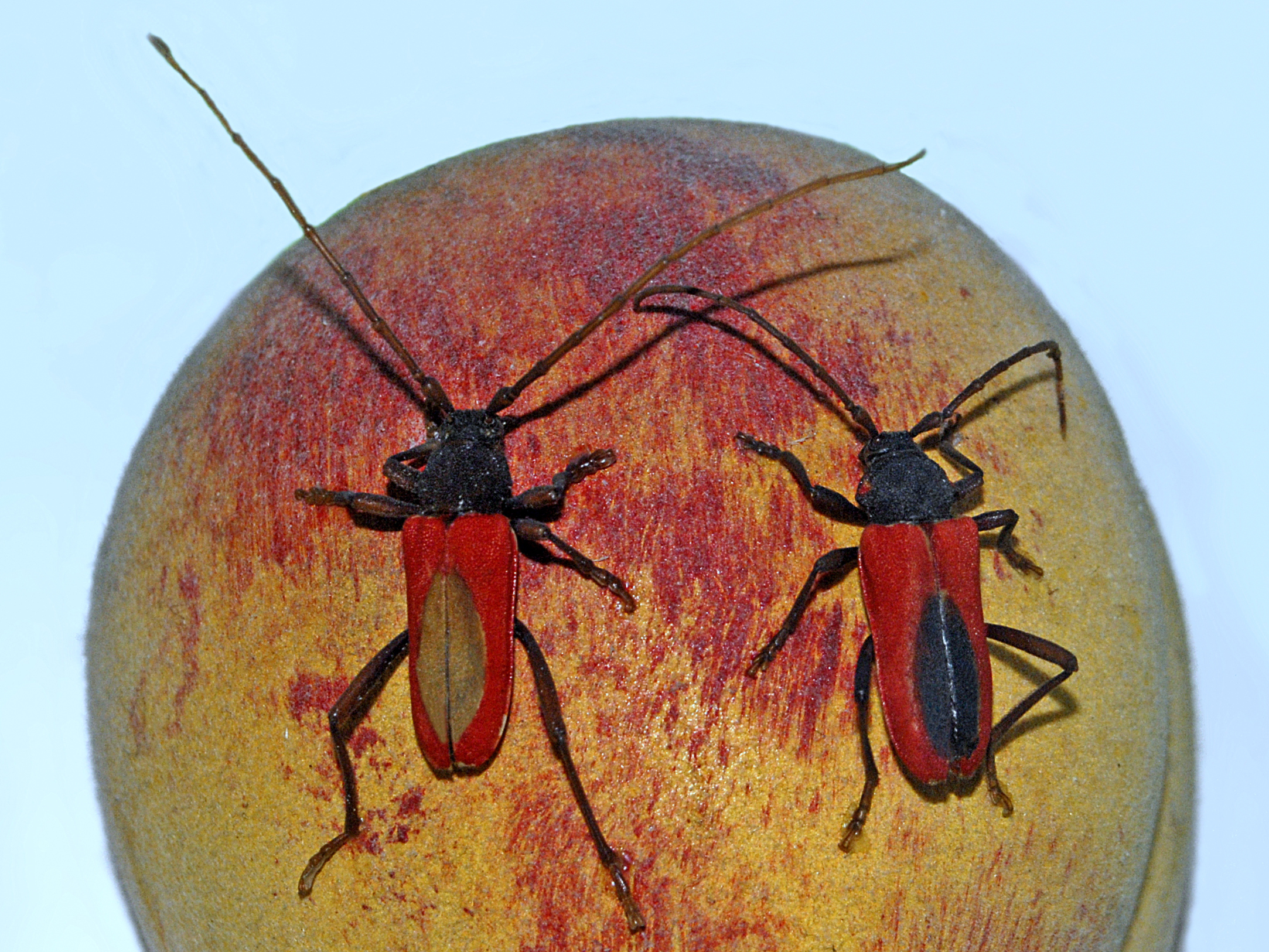
- Purpuricenus species. Mounted specimen.

Scientific classification
- Kingdom: Animalia
- Phylum: Arthropoda
- Class: Insecta
- Order: Coleoptera
- Suborder: Polyphaga
- Infraorder: Cucujiformia
- Family: Cerambycidae
- Subfamily: Cerambycinae
- Tribe: Trachyderini
- Genus: Purpuricenus; Dejean, 1821

= Purpuricenus =

Genus of beetles

Purpuricenus is a genus of beetles in the family Cerambycidae, containing the following species:

- Purpuricenus axillaris Haldeman, 1847
- Purpuricenus dimidiatus LeConte, 1884
- Purpuricenus humeralis (Fabricius, 1798)
- Purpuricenus laetus (Thomson, 1864)
- Purpuricenus linsleyi Chemsak, 1961
- Purpuricenus opacus (Knull, 1937)
- Purpuricenus paraxillaris MacRae, 2000
- Purpuricenus sanguinolentus (Olivier, 1795)
