= Purpuricenus linsleyi =

Scientific classification
- Kingdom: Animalia
- Phylum: Arthropoda
- Clade: Pancrustacea
- Class: Insecta
- Order: Coleoptera
- Suborder: Polyphaga
- Infraorder: Cucujiformia
- Family: Cerambycidae
- Genus: Purpuricenus
- Species: P. linsleyi

Binomial name
- Purpuricenus linsleyi Chemsak, 1961

Species of beetle

Purpuricenus linsleyi is a species of beetle in the family Cerambycidae. It was described by Chemsak in 1961.
