= Bambusa basihirsuta =

Scientific classification
- Kingdom: Plantae
- Clade: Tracheophytes
- Clade: Angiosperms
- Clade: Monocots
- Clade: Commelinids
- Order: Poales
- Family: Poaceae
- Genus: Bambusa
- Species: B. basihirsuta

Binomial name
- Bambusa basihirsuta McClure

Synonyms
- Homotypic Synonyms: Dendrocalamopsis basihirsuta (McClure) Q.F.Zheng & Y.M.Lin; Sinocalamus basihirsutus (McClure) W.T.Lin; Heterotypic Synonyms: Bambusa prasina T.H.Wen; Dendrocalamopsis prasina (T.H.Wen) Keng f.

Species of grass

Bambusa basihirsuta is a species of bamboo in the family Poaceae.

== Distribution ==
Bambusa basihirsuta is endemic to Guangdong and Zhejiang provinces of China.

== Description ==
Bambusa basihirsuta has 3 lodicules, all membranous and ciliate. It has anthers that are 7 mm long. It has 2 to 3 stigmas. It can grow to a 700–1200 cm in height, enabled by a 60–90 mm diameter woody stem.
