= Bambusa basihirsutoides =

Scientific classification
- Kingdom: Plantae
- Clade: Tracheophytes
- Clade: Angiosperms
- Clade: Monocots
- Clade: Commelinids
- Order: Poales
- Family: Poaceae
- Genus: Bambusa
- Species: B. basihirsutoides

Binomial name
- Bambusa basihirsutoides N.H.Xia

Species of grass

Bambusa basihirsutoides is a species of Bambusa bamboo.

== Synonyms ==
Bambusa baishirsutoides has 1 synonym.

- Sinocalamus concavus W.T.Lin & Z.M.Wu

== Distribution ==
Bambusa basihirsutoides is commonly found in Guangdong province and Zhejiang province of China.

== Description ==
Bambusa basihirsutoides has 6 anthers growing to 7 mm in length and 2 to 3 stigmas. It is perennial and caespitose with rhizomes. Its culms are erect, allowing it to grow up to a height of 700–1200 cm long; This is enabled by a woody stem without nodal roots that grow to 60–90 millimeters in diameter.
