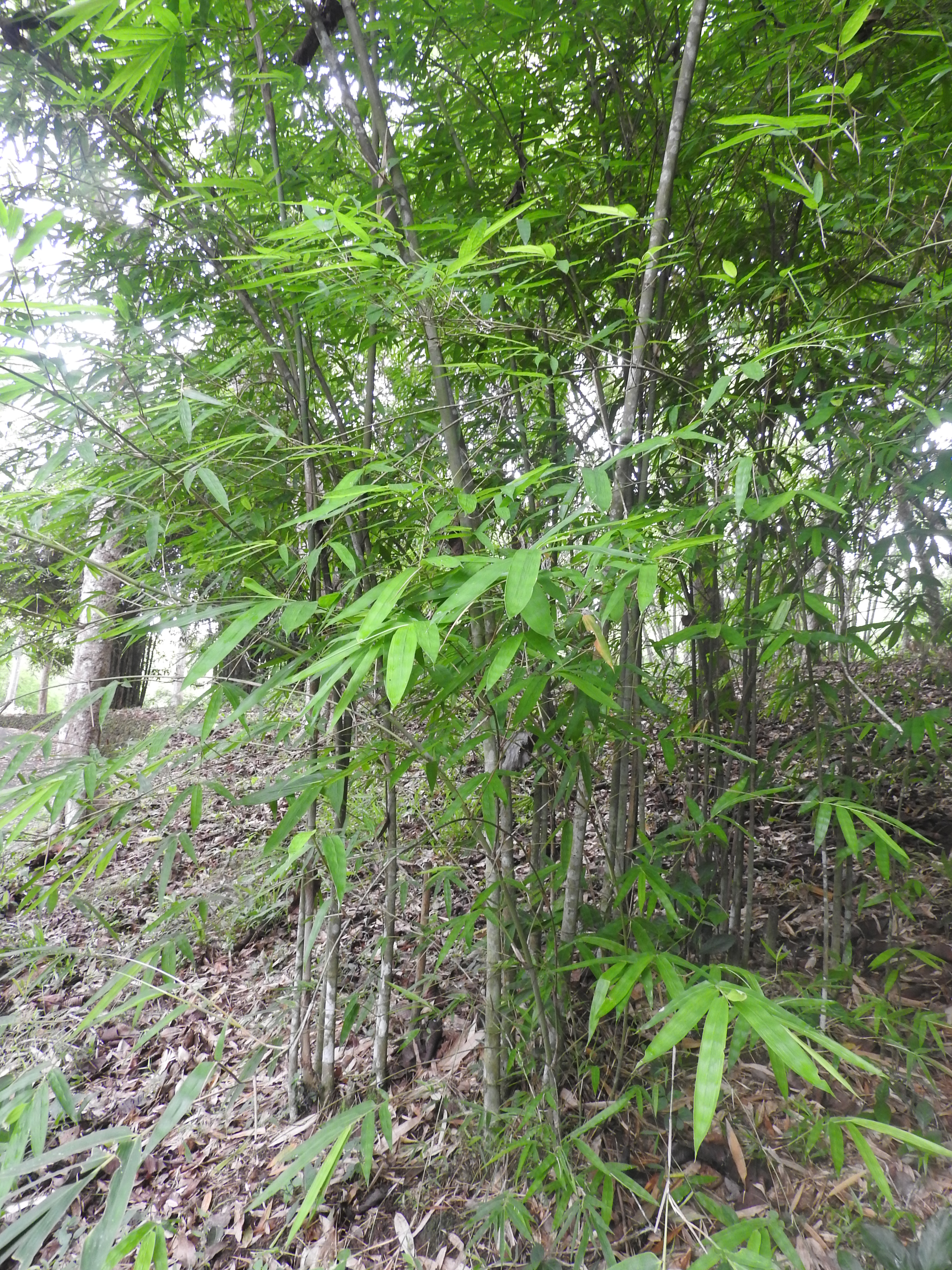
- Dendrocalamus longispathus

Scientific classification
- Kingdom: Plantae
- Clade: Tracheophytes
- Clade: Angiosperms
- Clade: Monocots
- Clade: Commelinids
- Order: Poales
- Family: Poaceae
- Genus: Dendrocalamus
- Species: D. longispathus

Binomial name
- Dendrocalamus longispathus (Kurz) Kurz

Synonyms
- Bambusa longispatha Kurz

= Dendrocalamus longispathus =

Long-sheath bamboo

Species of grass

Dendrocalamus longispathus, the long-sheath bamboo, is a species of bamboo in the family Poaceae. It grows up to 20 m tall. It is native to Bangladesh, Myanmar, and Thailand. It has now become an exotic species all over the South Asia.

== Appearance ==
Culms are green with white blooms when young, which become greyish-green when dry. Young shoots are yellowish-green in color with shiny black hairs. Culm is straight. Branches spread out from the mid-culm to top. Aerial roots reach up to few nodes above the ground. Internode length is 25–50 cm, and diameter is 2.0–10 cm. Culm walls are 0.8–1.5 cm thick.

Culm sheaths are green in young plants and turn brown when mature, and are elongated and cylindrical with narrow, lanceolate blades. The sheath proper is 10–20 cm in length and 13–20 cm wide. Blade length is 13–20 cm. Auricles are absent. Upper surfaces of the sheaths are covered with blackish-brown hairs. Lower surfaces of the sheaths are not hairy. Sheaths are persistent (do not fall).
