= Bambusa barpatharica =

Scientific classification
- Kingdom: Plantae
- Clade: Tracheophytes
- Clade: Angiosperms
- Clade: Monocots
- Clade: Commelinids
- Order: Poales
- Family: Poaceae
- Genus: Bambusa
- Species: B. barpatharica

Binomial name
- Bambusa barpatharica Borthakur & Barooah

Species of grass

Bambusa barpatharica is a species of Bambusa bamboo.

== Distribution ==
Bambusa barpatharica is native to an area from the Indian states of Assam to Arunachal Pradesh.

== Description ==
Bambusa barpatharica is a perennial, caespitose species with short rhizomes. It is considered a pachymorph. Its culms allow it to grow up to 1500–2000 cm in height with much credit due to its 80–100 mm diameter woody stem. Its culm-internodes are terete; often they are hollow and grow 30–50 cm long, displaying a dark green distally pruinose sheen. Lateral branches are dendroid. Buds or branches are present on the lower quarter of culm. Culm-sheaths deciduous and reach upwards of 12–22 cm in length. Leaf-blades persistent, or deciduous at the ligule; They are lanceolate, reaching 16–22 cm long and 20–30 mm wide. They are mid-green and glaucous, resulting in a discolorous way with last colour beneath.
