= Bambusa angustissima =

Scientific classification
- Kingdom: Plantae
- Clade: Tracheophytes
- Clade: Angiosperms
- Clade: Monocots
- Clade: Commelinids
- Order: Poales
- Family: Poaceae
- Genus: Bambusa
- Species: B. angustissima

Binomial name
- Bambusa angustissima L.C.Chia & H.L.Fung

Species of grass

Bambusa angustissima is a species of Bambusa bamboo.

== Distribution ==
Bambusa angustissima is endemic to Gaozhou of Guangdong province of China.

== Description ==
The plant grows to 900 cm in height and 50 mm diameter for the stems.
