= Bambusa angustiaurita =

Scientific classification
- Kingdom: Plantae
- Clade: Tracheophytes
- Clade: Angiosperms
- Clade: Monocots
- Clade: Commelinids
- Order: Poales
- Family: Poaceae
- Genus: Bambusa
- Species: B. angustiaurita

Binomial name
- Bambusa angustiaurita W.T.Lin

Species of grass

Bambusa angustiaurita is a species of Bambusa bamboo.

== Distribution ==
Bambusa angustiaurita is endemic to temperate regions of Guangdong province of China.

== Description ==
Bambusa angustiaurita is perennial and grows short rhizomes in caespitose form. Its tips are inclined at the tip, which reaches 800–1000 cm in height with its woody stem growing to 30–60 cm.
