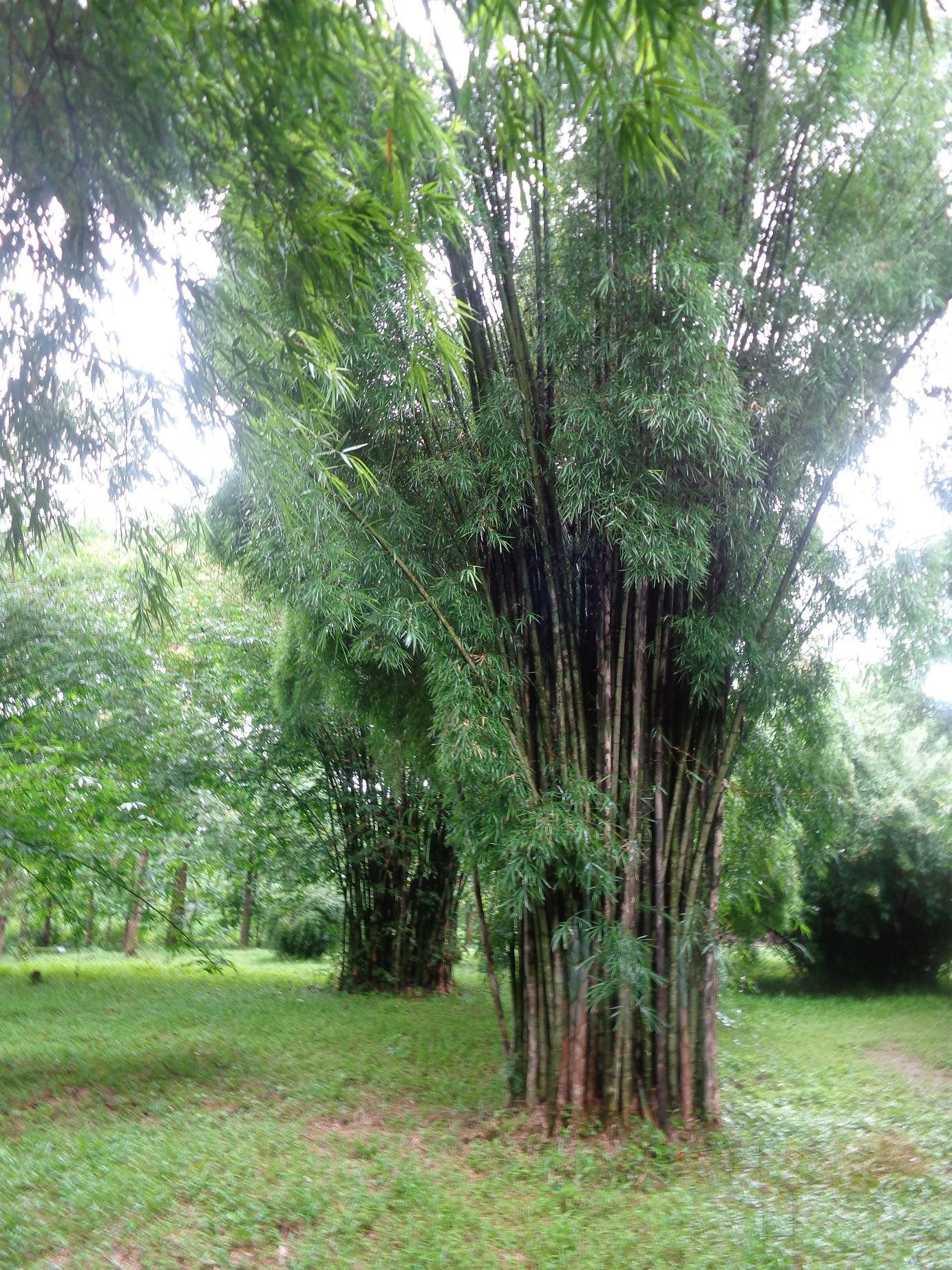

Scientific classification
- Kingdom: Plantae
- Clade: Tracheophytes
- Clade: Angiosperms
- Clade: Monocots
- Clade: Commelinids
- Order: Poales
- Family: Poaceae
- Genus: Bambusa
- Species: B. affinis

Binomial name
- Bambusa affinis Munro

Synonyms
- Arundarbor affinis (Munro) Kuntze

= Bambusa affinis =

Species of grass

Bambusa affinis is a species of Bambusa bamboo, and a member of the grass family.

== Description ==
The perennial plant can grow to 500–600 cm long and the stem can go up to 25–35 mm diameter.

== Distribution ==
It can be found in the tropical regions of Indo-China.
