= Bambusa brevispicula =

Scientific classification
- Kingdom: Plantae
- Clade: Tracheophytes
- Clade: Angiosperms
- Clade: Monocots
- Clade: Commelinids
- Order: Poales
- Family: Poaceae
- Genus: Bambusa
- Species: B. brevispicula

Binomial name
- Bambusa brevispicula Holttum

Species of grass

Bambusa brevispicula is a species of Bambusa bamboo.

== Distribution ==
Bambusa brevispicula is endemic to New Guinea.

== Description ==
Bambusa brevispicula is perennial and has 6 stamen.
