= Bambusa basisolida =

Scientific classification
- Kingdom: Plantae
- Clade: Tracheophytes
- Clade: Angiosperms
- Clade: Monocots
- Clade: Commelinids
- Order: Poales
- Family: Poaceae
- Genus: Bambusa
- Species: B. basisolida

Binomial name
- Bambusa basisolida W.T.Lin

Species of grass

Bambusa basisolida is a species of Bambusa bamboo.

== Distribution ==
Bambusa basisolida is commonly found in Guangdong province of China.
