= Purpuricenus dimidiatus =

Scientific classification
- Domain: Eukaryota
- Kingdom: Animalia
- Phylum: Arthropoda
- Class: Insecta
- Order: Coleoptera
- Suborder: Polyphaga
- Infraorder: Cucujiformia
- Family: Cerambycidae
- Genus: Purpuricenus
- Species: P. dimidiatus

Binomial name
- Purpuricenus dimidiatus LeConte, 1884

Species of beetle

Purpuricenus dimidiatus is a species of beetle in the family Cerambycidae. It was described by John Lawrence LeConte in 1884.
