= Bambusa latideltata =

Scientific classification
- Kingdom: Plantae
- Clade: Tracheophytes
- Clade: Angiosperms
- Clade: Monocots
- Clade: Commelinids
- Order: Poales
- Family: Poaceae
- Genus: Bambusa
- Species: B. latideltata

Binomial name
- Bambusa latideltata W.T. Lin

Species of plant

Bambusa latideltata is a species of Bambusa bamboo.

== Distribution ==
Bambusa latideltata is endemic to Guangdong province of China.
