= Purpuricenus humeralis =

Scientific classification
- Kingdom: Animalia
- Phylum: Arthropoda
- Clade: Pancrustacea
- Class: Insecta
- Order: Coleoptera
- Suborder: Polyphaga
- Infraorder: Cucujiformia
- Family: Cerambycidae
- Genus: Purpuricenus
- Species: P. humeralis

Binomial name
- Purpuricenus humeralis (Fabricius, 1798)

Species of beetle

Purpuricenus humeralis is a species of beetle in the family Cerambycidae. It was described by Fabricus in 1798.The common name of this species is Red Triangle Longhorn beetle, owing to the distinctive red triangles on its elytron (wing case).
