= Bambusa flexuosa =

Scientific classification
- Kingdom: Plantae
- Clade: Tracheophytes
- Clade: Angiosperms
- Clade: Monocots
- Clade: Commelinids
- Order: Poales
- Family: Poaceae
- Genus: Bambusa
- Species: B. flexuosa

Binomial name
- Bambusa flexuosa Munro

Species of grass

Bambusa flexuosa is a species of Bambusa bamboo.

== Synonyms ==
- Arundarbor flexuosa (Munro) Kuntze
- Bambusa scabriculma W.T.Lin

== Distribution ==
Bambusa flexuosa is endemic to Guangdong province of China.
