= Bambusa procera =

Scientific classification
- Kingdom: Plantae
- Clade: Tracheophytes
- Clade: Angiosperms
- Clade: Monocots
- Clade: Commelinids
- Order: Poales
- Family: Poaceae
- Genus: Bambusa
- Species: B. procera

Binomial name
- Bambusa procera A.Chev. & A.Camus

Species of grass

Bambusa procera is a species of bamboo in the tribe Bambuseae; it was described from Vietnam by Chevalier and Camus. It is a included in the grass family, with no subspecies listed in the Catalogue of Life.

== Distribution and description ==
The recorded distribution includes Cambodia and Vietnam: where the plant is called lồ ô; it is smaller than B. balcooa (tre lồ ô), which is more extensively used for construction.

This bamboo grows as a plant from 8-12 m tall, with cylindrical, thin-walled internodes up to 550 mm long and 55 mm in diameter. Leaves are from 200-250 mm long and 40-50 mm wide.

== Uses ==
In Vietnam's Bình Dương province, it is used for food, in construction as timber, and to make ornaments and handicraft.
