= Bambusa australis =

Scientific classification
- Kingdom: Plantae
- Clade: Tracheophytes
- Clade: Angiosperms
- Clade: Monocots
- Clade: Commelinids
- Order: Poales
- Family: Poaceae
- Genus: Bambusa
- Species: B. australis

Binomial name
- Bambusa australis L.C.Chia & H.L.Fung

Synonyms
- Lingnania atra ^{McClure}

Species of grass

Bambusa australis is a species of Bambusa bamboo.

== Distribution ==
Bambusa australis is endemic to Vietnam and China.

== Description ==
Bambusa australis grows up to 11 m (36 ft) in height.
