= Bambusa cerosissima =

Scientific classification
- Kingdom: Plantae
- Clade: Tracheophytes
- Clade: Angiosperms
- Clade: Monocots
- Clade: Commelinids
- Order: Poales
- Family: Poaceae
- Genus: Bambusa
- Species: B. cerosissima

Binomial name
- Bambusa cerosissima McClure, 1936

Synonyms
- Lingnania cerosissima McClure, 1940

Species of grass

Bambusa cerosissima is a species of clumping bamboo in the family Poaceae.

== Distribution ==
Bambusa cerossissma is endemic from the Guangdong province of China to Vietnam.

== Description ==
Bambusa cerosissma is a perennial species that grows up to 10–15 m (33–49 ft) tall. Its woody stem can reach a diameter of 4–5 cm (1.6–2.0 in).
