= Purpuricenus opacus =

Scientific classification
- Domain: Eukaryota
- Kingdom: Animalia
- Phylum: Arthropoda
- Class: Insecta
- Order: Coleoptera
- Suborder: Polyphaga
- Infraorder: Cucujiformia
- Family: Cerambycidae
- Genus: Purpuricenus
- Species: P. opacus

Binomial name
- Purpuricenus opacus (Knull, 1937)

Species of beetle

Purpuricenus opacus is a species of beetle in the family Cerambycidae. It was described by Knull in 1937.
