= Bambusa albolineata =

Scientific classification
- Kingdom: Plantae
- Clade: Tracheophytes
- Clade: Angiosperms
- Clade: Monocots
- Clade: Commelinids
- Order: Poales
- Family: Poaceae
- Genus: Bambusa
- Species: B. albolineata

Binomial name
- Bambusa albolineata L.C.Chia

Synonyms
- Bambusa textilis var. albostriata

Species of grass

Bambusa albolineata is a species of Bambusa bamboo.

== Distribution ==
It is found in the temperate regions of Asia, mainly China and eastern Asia.

== Description ==
The bamboo is perennial. Its rhizomes are short. It can grow to 600–800 cm long with a maximum width of 35 to 55 mm diameter in a very woody form. It does not produce nodal roots.
