= Neololeba atra =

Scientific classification
- Kingdom: Plantae
- Clade: Tracheophytes
- Clade: Angiosperms
- Clade: Monocots
- Clade: Commelinids
- Order: Poales
- Family: Poaceae
- Genus: Neololeba
- Species: N. atra

Binomial name
- Neololeba atra (Lindl.) Widjaja

Synonyms
- Arundarbor atra (Lindl.) Kuntze; Arundarbor picta (Lindl.) Kuntze; Arundarbor prava (Lindl.) Kuntze; Arundarbor tenuis (Munro) Kuntze; Arundinaria cobonii F.M.Bailey; Arundinaria papuana K.Schum. & Lauterb.; Bambusa atra Lindl.; Bambusa forbesii (Ridl.) Holttum; Bambusa papuana (Lauterb. & K.Schum.) K.Schum.; Bambusa picta Lindl.; Bambusa prava Lindl.; Bambusa tenuis Munro; Dendrocalamus forbesii Ridl.; Dendrocalamus multispiculatus K.Schum. & Lauterb.; Dendrocalamus papuanus (Lauterb. & K.Schum.) Pilg.; Gigantochloa novoguineensis Rendle; Leleba alba ex Schult. [Invalid]; Leleba nigra ex Schult. [Invalid]; Leleba picta ex Schult. [Invalid]; Leleba prava ex Schult. [Invalid]; Leleba rumphiana ex Schult. [Invalid]

Species of grass

Neololeba atra, the black bamboo, is a species of tropical Asian, Australian, and Papuasian bamboos in the grass family Poaceae.

== Habit ==
Black bamboo is a short, small-culmed, green bamboo species 5–7 m high. It forms impenetrable thickets with densely clustered clumps with a large number of closely growing culms. It is native to the Philippines, Sulawesi, Maluku, New Guinea, Bismarck Archipelago, and Queensland. It is an exotic species in Indian subcontinent countries, such as India and Sri Lanka.

== Appearance ==
Culms are dark green when young, and become yellowish-green when mature and brownish-green when dry. Young shoots are also green. Internode length is 60–80 cm and diameter is about 2.5 to 5.0 cm. Culm walls are very thin. Nodes are not prominent. Branching occurs only at the top and no aerial roots can be seen.

Culm sheaths are green in young plants, becoming straw-colored when mature. Culm sheath blades are flame-shaped. The sheath proper is 9–12 cm long and 6–9 cm wide. Auricles are equal, small, and wavy, continuous with the blade, which is situated on top of the sheath. Upper surfaces of the culm sheaths are covered with light brown hairs. Under surfaces are not hairy. Sheaths fall off early.

== Uses ==
In Indonesia, strips of the black bamboo are used to make window blinds and the leaves are used for thatching.
