= Bambusa bicicatricata =

Scientific classification
- Kingdom: Plantae
- Clade: Tracheophytes
- Clade: Angiosperms
- Clade: Monocots
- Clade: Commelinids
- Order: Poales
- Family: Poaceae
- Genus: Bambusa
- Species: B. bicicatricata

Binomial name
- Bambusa bicicatricata W.T.Lin

Species of grass

Bambusa bicicatricata is a species of Bambusa bamboo.

== Synonyms ==
Bambusa bicicatricata has 3 synonyms.

- Dendrocalamopsis bicicatricata (W.T.Lin) Keng f.
- Neosinocalamus bicicatricatus (W.T.Lin) W.T.Lin
- Sinocalamus bicicatricatus W.T.Lin

== Distribution ==
Bambusa bicicatricata is endemic to the temperate regions of Hainan province of China.

== Description ==
Bambusa bicicatricata can grow up to a height of 1,000 cm. It has a 55–75 mm diameter woody stem. There are 6 anthers, each 3.5 mm long.
