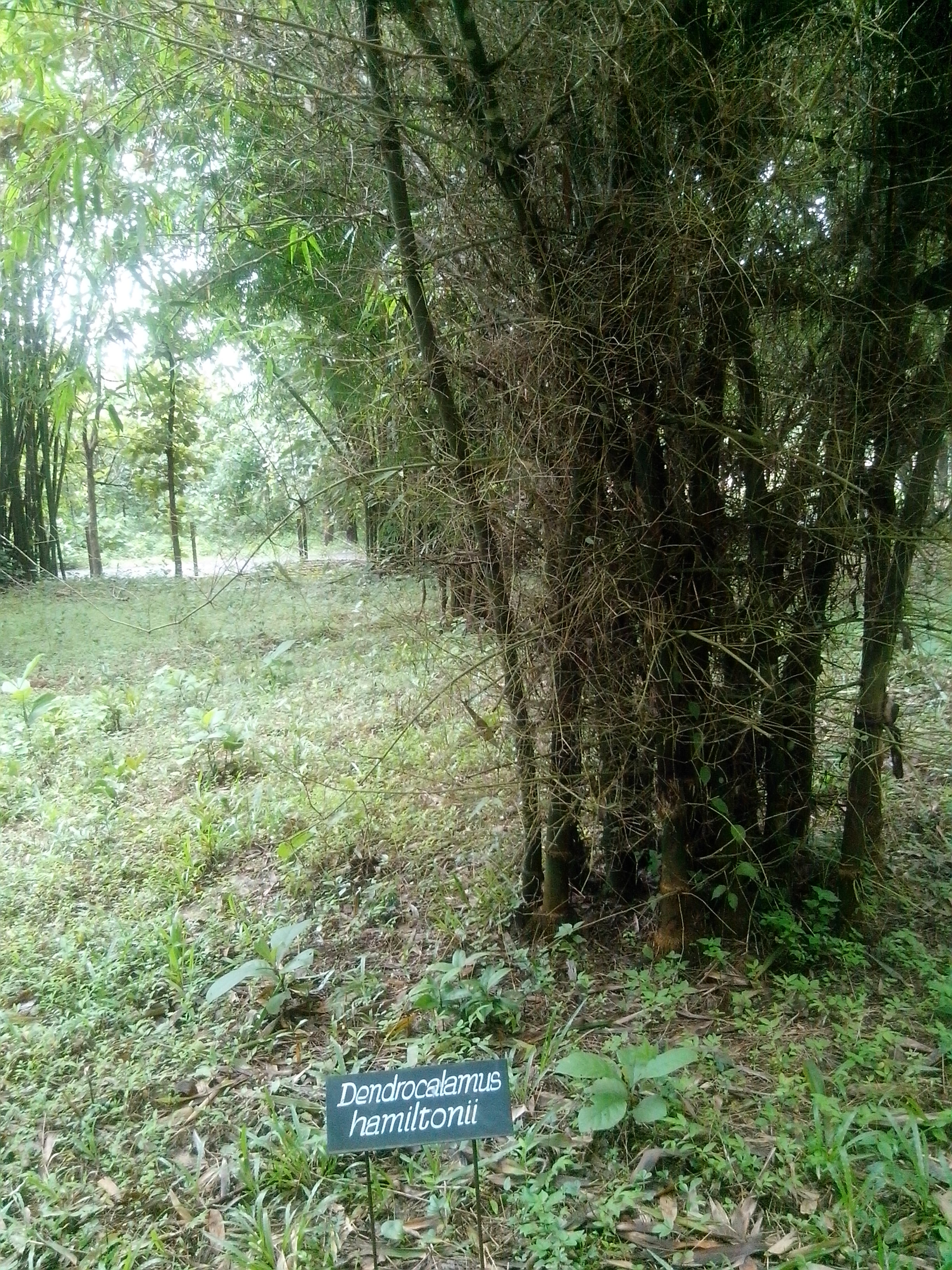
- Dendrocalamus harmitonii at the bamboo garden of KFRI (Kerala Forest Research Institute) at Palappilli, Thrissur district, Kerala, India.

Scientific classification
- Kingdom: Plantae
- Clade: Embryophytes
- Clade: Tracheophytes
- Clade: Spermatophytes
- Clade: Angiosperms
- Clade: Monocots
- Clade: Commelinids
- Order: Poales
- Family: Poaceae
- Genus: Dendrocalamus
- Species: D. hamiltonii

Binomial name
- Dendrocalamus hamiltonii Gamble

Synonyms
- Sinocalamus hamiltonii

= Dendrocalamus hamiltonii =

Hamilton's bamboo

Species of grass

Dendrocalamus hamiltonii, or Hamilton's bamboo, is a species of bamboo, 12–15 cm in diameter and growing up to 15–18 m in height, found in South Asian countries such as, India, Sri Lanka, Bhutan, Nepal, Pakistan, and far eastern China.

== Habit ==
It is a tall, dull green-colored bamboo species with drooping tops, which grows in thickets consisting of a few closely growing culms.

== Appearance ==
Culms are dull green covered with whitish-brown hairs, which become dull brownish-green when dry. Whitish bands occur below and above the nodes. Culms are noticeably zig-zag. Branching occurs from the base to top. Aerial roots are present in all nodes. Internode length is 30–40 cm, and diameter is 5–15 cm. Culm walls are 0.5–1.5 cm thick. Nodes of some culms are bent.

Culm sheaths are green when young and turn yellowish brown when mature, and are long and gradually tapering upwards from a flattened base. The sheath proper is 18–45 cm in length and 15–28 cm wide. Blade length is 8–20 cm. Auricles are absent. Upper surfaces of the sheaths are covered with patches of blackish-brown hairs. Lower surfaces of the sheaths are not hairy. Sheaths fall off early.

== Varieties ==
- D. h. var. edulis
- D. h. var. hamiltonii
- D. h. var. undulatus
