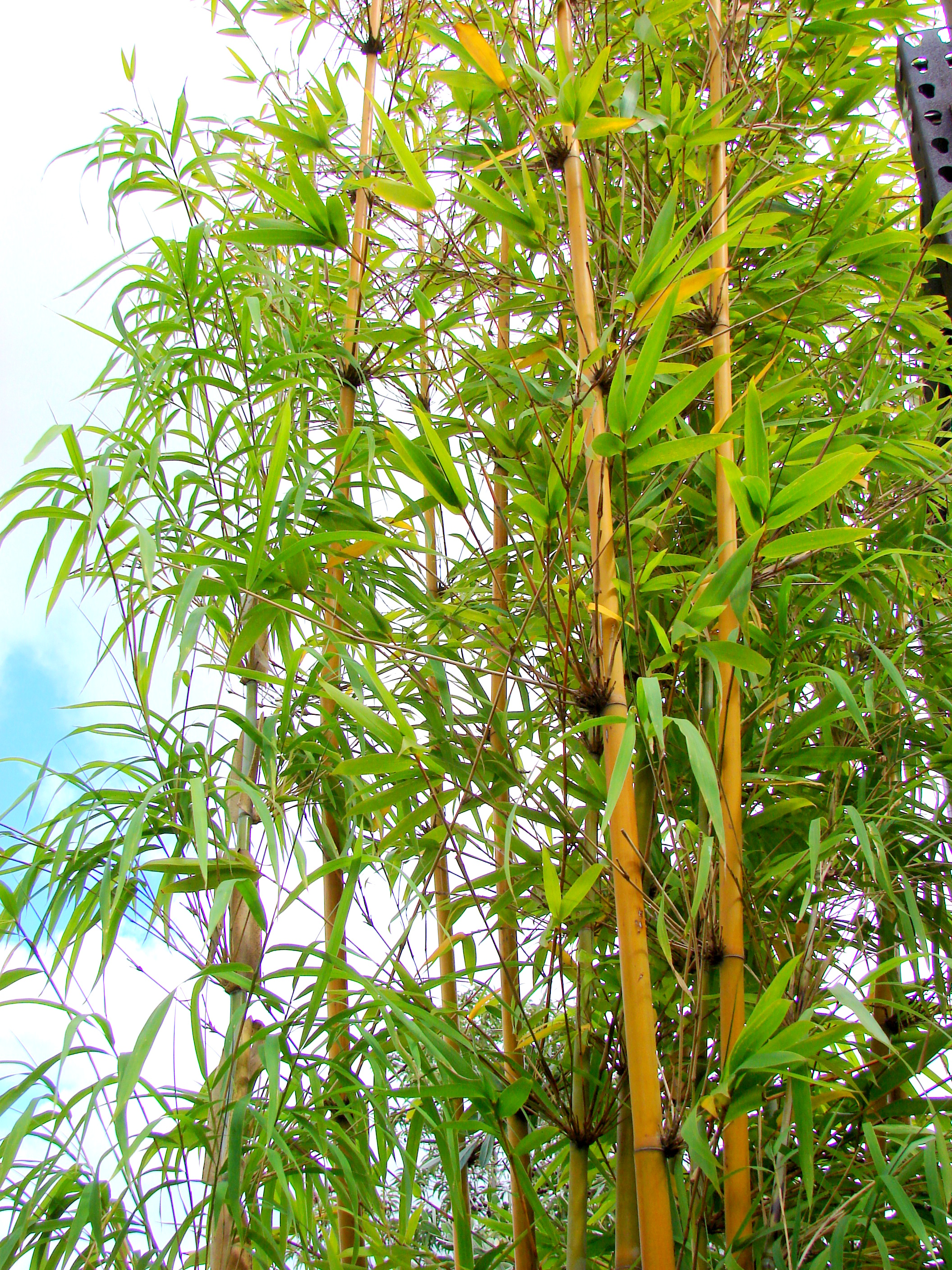

Scientific classification
- Kingdom: Plantae
- Clade: Tracheophytes
- Clade: Angiosperms
- Clade: Monocots
- Clade: Commelinids
- Order: Poales
- Family: Poaceae
- Genus: Bambusa
- Species: B. textilis

Binomial name
- Bambusa textilis McClure, 1940

Synonyms
- Bambusa varioaurita W.T.Lin & Z.J.Feng; Bambusa textilis var. purpurascens Bambusa textilis f. purpurascens Bambusa textilis var. pubescens Bambusa textilis var. maculata Bambusa textilis var. gracilis Bambusa textilis var. glabra Bambusa minutiligulata W.T.Lin & Z.M.Wu; Bambusa glaucescens var. annulata Bambusa annulata W.T.Lin & Z.J.Feng

= Bambusa textilis =

Species of grass

Bambusa textilis, also known as slender bamboo, clumping bamboo and weaver's bamboo, is a species of bamboo in the Poaceae (grasses) family that is native to China. The subspecies var. gracilis is heavily cultivated in Australia.

== Description ==
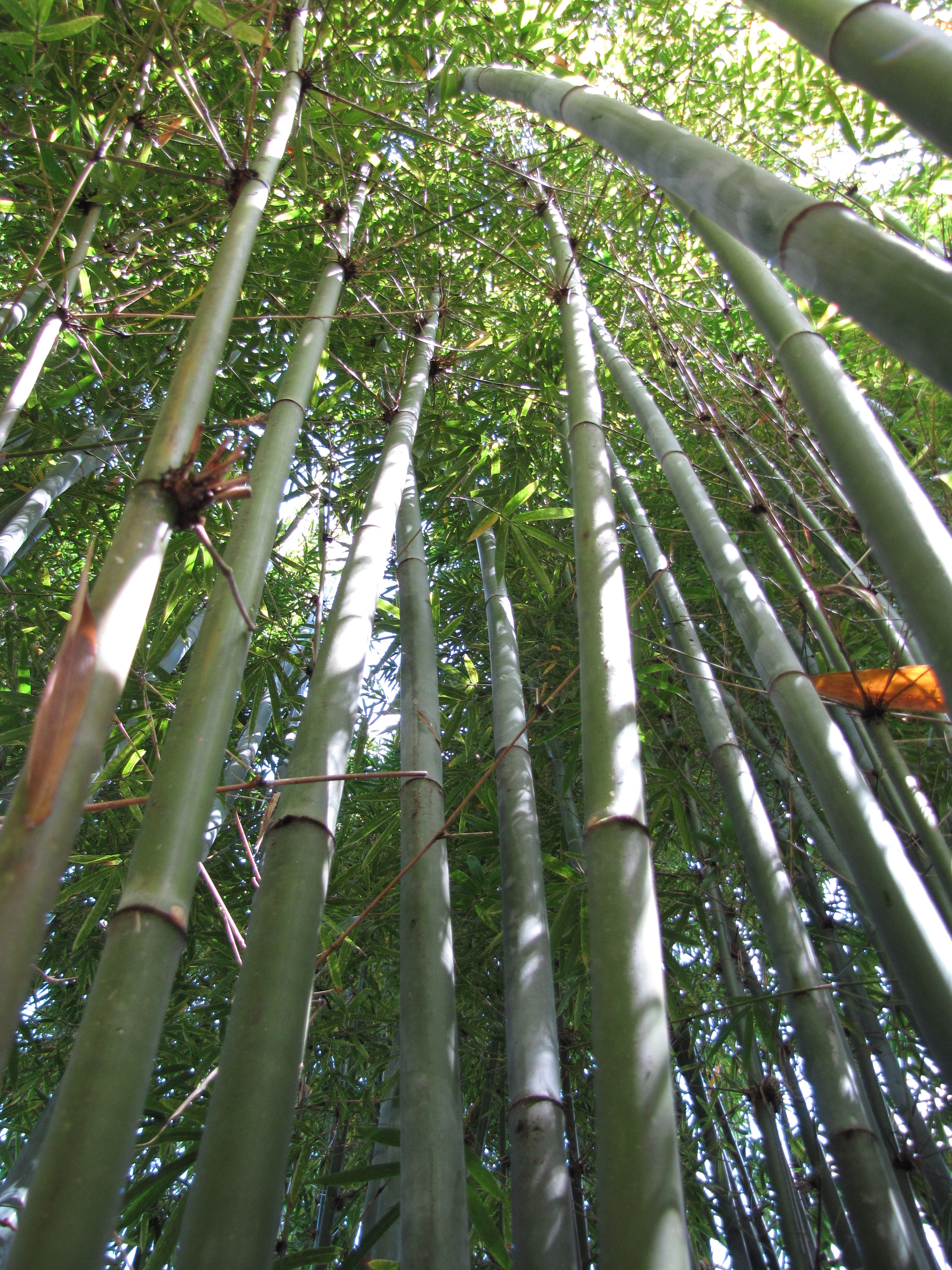
Canopy of slender bamboo in Maui, Hawaii

Slender bamboo is a giant, densely leaved, upright bamboo, that grows in a tight clump up to 6 to 10 meters (20 to 33 ft) high and 2 meters (6.6 ft) in width at a fast rate and has a stem size of 3 cm (1.2 in).

Having elegant leaves that are lanceolate shaped, 9-25 x 1-2.5 cm long, and greenish blue-hued culm that is glossy and leathery, its long green internodes, 35–60 cm (14–24 in), change to yellow during prolonged sunlight exposure. Despite being an evergreen, some leaf loss can be expected in winter, but this depends on the location and microclimate.

The stalk and the rhizome are one, making it a non-invasive plant. The top part of the short rhizome has buds, one of which grows into another very truncated rhizome that then turns upward to surface from the ground as a subsidiary culm close to the parent.

== Distribution ==
In its native southern China, it usually found near rivers, on hills and villages at low altitudes in the Anhui, Guangdong, Fujian and Guangxi provinces. It has been naturalized in Hawaii, Florida, Colombia and Puerto Rico.

== Cultivation ==
It is cultivated in particular to constitute hedges or privacy screens in suburban yards and can be planted in subtropical/tropical gardens where it can complement the native rainforest flora, and as well as in garden beds near a fence. It can also provide both noise and wind break, in addition to tolerating winds and temperatures as low as −10 °C (14 °F). Growing best in full sun to part shade, it may benefit from some mulch and nitrogen fertiliser.

The variety var. gracilis is one of the most popular bamboos, especially in Australia, which is known as Gracilis bamboo, that forms a sightly slender clump and grows no more than 8 meters (26 ft) high. It reaches maturity within 3–5 years, depending on the weather and soil. A gracilis in a 200 mm (7.9 in) container would usually grow to around 3 to 4 meters (9.8 to 13.1 ft) in 12 months. The glabra variety features more white on the lower areas of the internodes, giving the plant a striped appearance, and the fusca variety is larger, growing up to 12 meters (39 ft) and would top a 3-storey building.

== Varieties ==
- B. textilis var. fusca
- B. textilis var. glabra
- B. textilis var. gracilis
- B. textilis var. maculata
- B. textilis var. textilis

== Sources ==
- "Bambusa textilis McClure". Catalogue of Life. Species 2000: Leiden, the Netherlands.
- "Bambusa textilis". World Checklist of Selected Plant Families (WCSP). Royal Botanic Gardens, Kew. Archived from the original on June 28, 2020.
- "Bambusa textilis McClure". Tropicos. Missouri Botanical Garden.
- "Bambusa textilis McClure, 1940". Universal Biological Indexer and Organizer (UBIO).
