= Bambusa aurinuda =

Scientific classification
- Kingdom: Plantae
- Clade: Tracheophytes
- Clade: Angiosperms
- Clade: Monocots
- Clade: Commelinids
- Order: Poales
- Family: Poaceae
- Genus: Bambusa
- Species: B. aurinuda

Binomial name
- Bambusa aurinuda McClure

Species of grass

Bambusa aurinuda is a species of bamboo in the family Poaceae.

== Distribution ==
Bambusa aurinuda is commonly found in the Tonkin vicinity of Vietnam.

== Description ==
Bambusa aurinuda is a Perennial and caespitose plant with rather short rhizomes. Its culms are erect, and allows it to grow up to a height of 800–1100 cm long. Its stem grows up to 40–100 mm in diameter. Its stem is woody. The surface of the leaf blade is leaf-blade surface is considered puberulous and sparsely hairy; It is hairy abaxially.
