= Dendrocalamus sikkimensis =

Scientific classification
- Kingdom: Plantae
- Clade: Tracheophytes
- Clade: Angiosperms
- Clade: Monocots
- Clade: Commelinids
- Order: Poales
- Family: Poaceae
- Genus: Dendrocalamus
- Species: D. sikkimensis

Binomial name
- Dendrocalamus sikkimensis Gamble ex Oliv.

Species of grass

Dendrocalamus sikkimensis is a bamboo species belonging to the Dendrocalamus genus. It has many branches that are normally orange in colour. It grows up to 18 metres (59 ft).
