= Bambusa concava =

Scientific classification
- Kingdom: Plantae
- Clade: Tracheophytes
- Clade: Angiosperms
- Clade: Monocots
- Clade: Commelinids
- Order: Poales
- Family: Poaceae
- Genus: Bambusa
- Species: B. concava

Binomial name
- Bambusa concava W.T. Lin

Species of grass

Bambusa concava is a species of Bambusa bamboo.

== Distribution ==
Bambusa concava is endemic to Hainan province of China.
