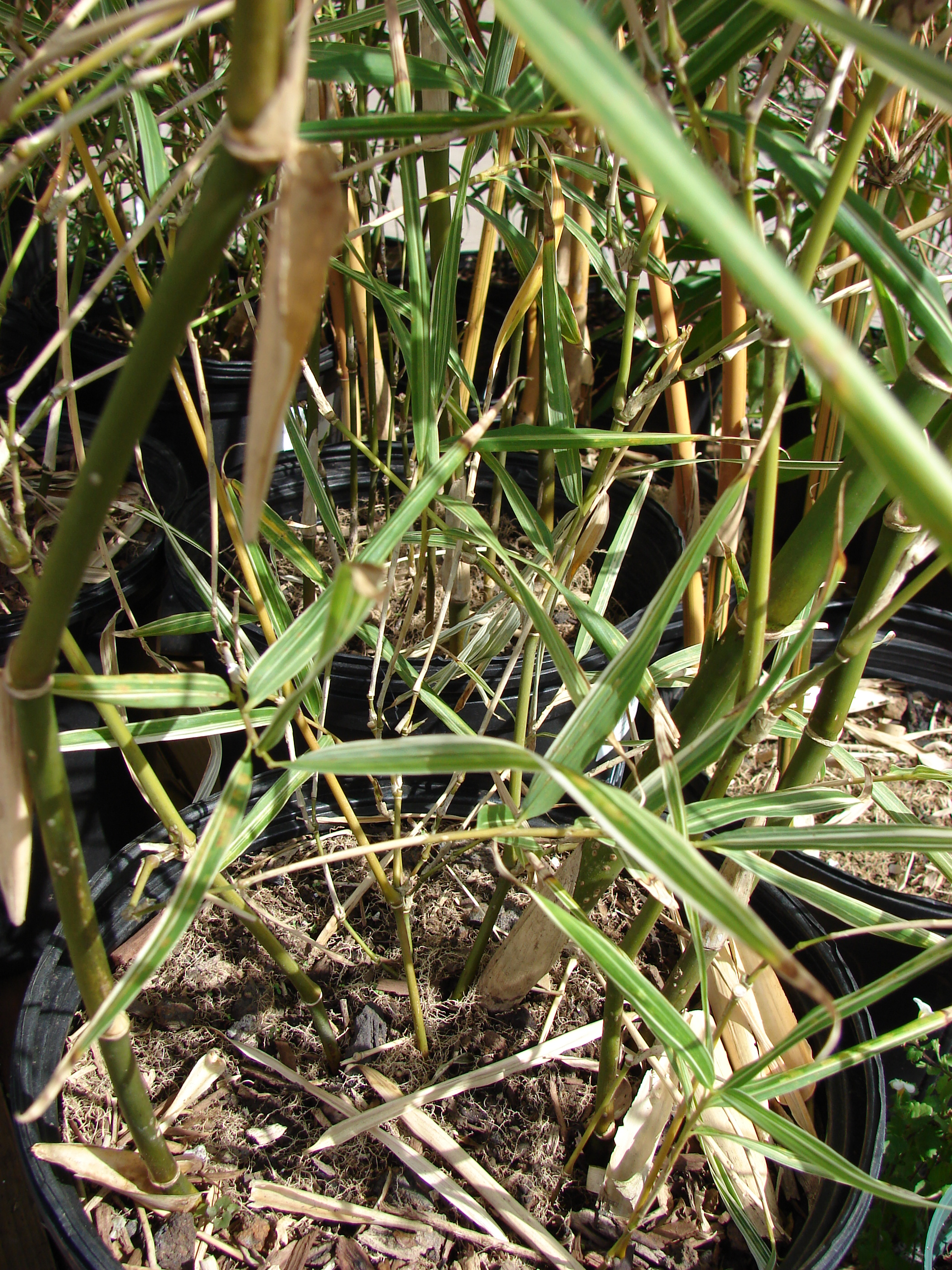
- Bambusa glaucophylla

Scientific classification
- Kingdom: Plantae
- Clade: Tracheophytes
- Clade: Angiosperms
- Clade: Monocots
- Clade: Commelinids
- Order: Poales
- Family: Poaceae
- Genus: Bambusa
- Species: B. glaucophylla

Binomial name
- Bambusa glaucophylla Widjaja

= Bambusa glaucophylla =

Species of grass

Bambusa glaucophylla is a species of Bambusa bamboo.
