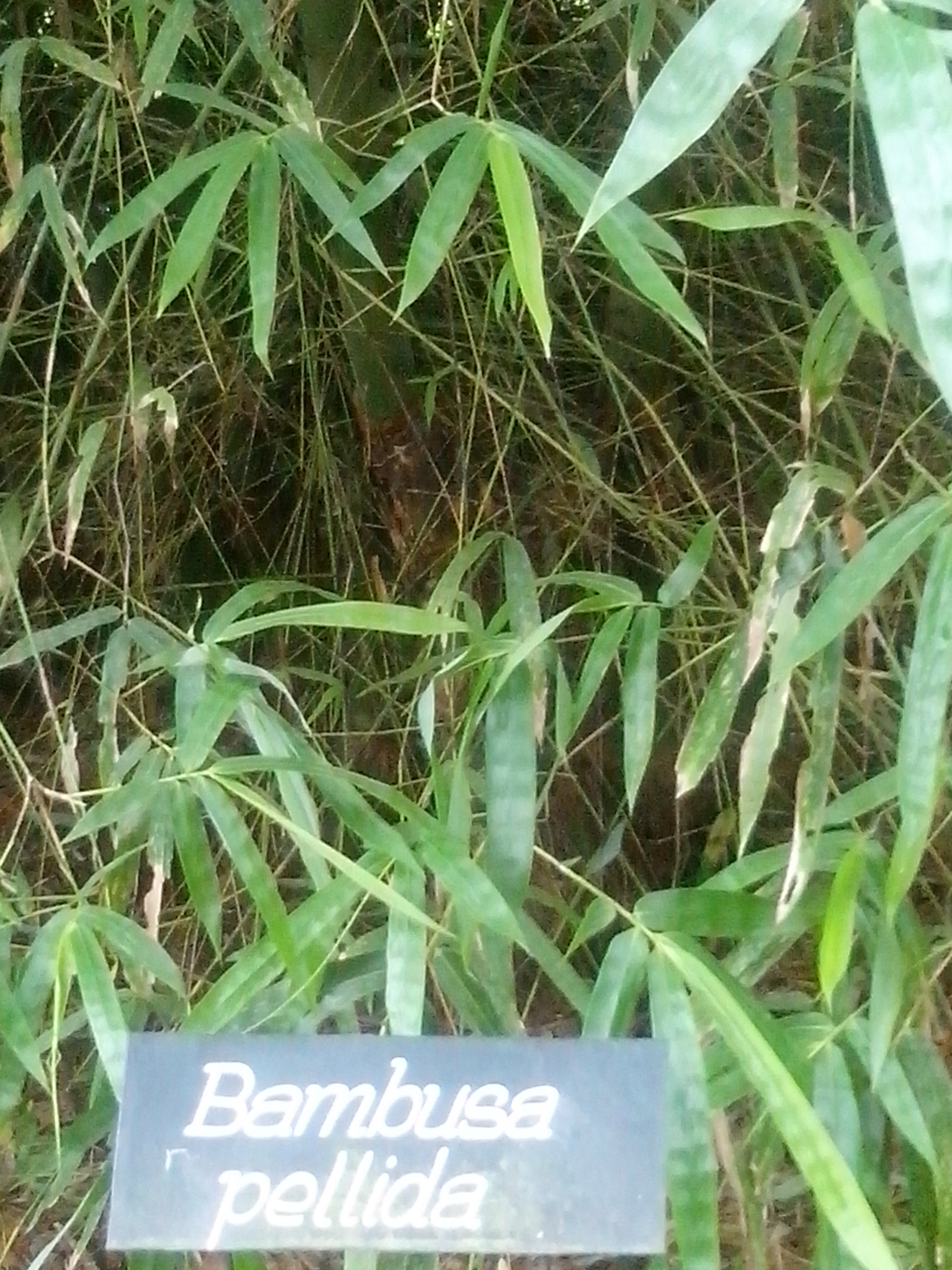

Scientific classification
- Kingdom: Plantae
- Clade: Tracheophytes
- Clade: Angiosperms
- Clade: Monocots
- Clade: Commelinids
- Order: Poales
- Family: Poaceae
- Genus: Bambusa
- Species: B. pallida

Binomial name
- Bambusa pallida (L.) Voss

= Bambusa pallida =

Species of grass

Bambusa pallida is a species of bamboo.

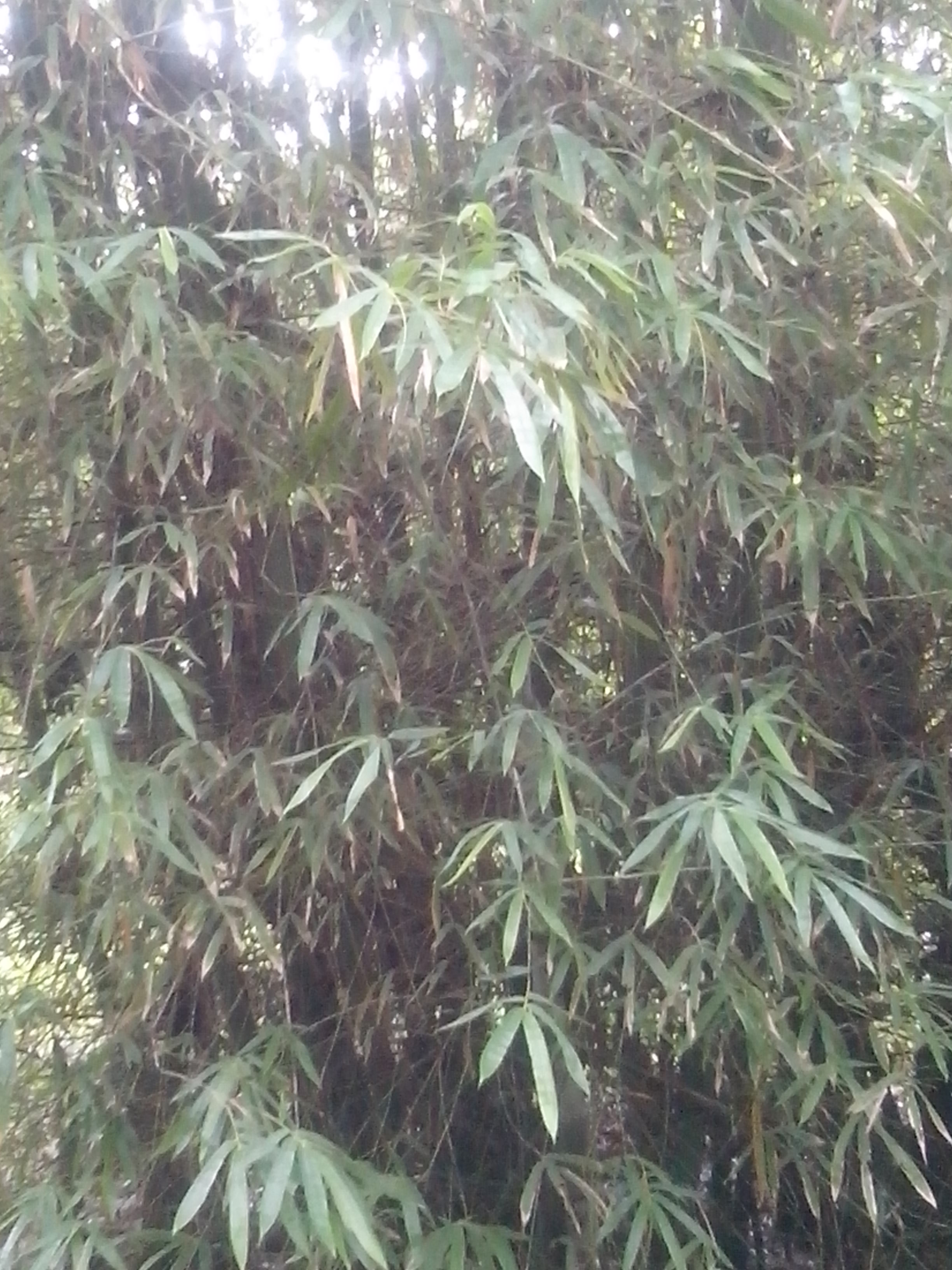
The bamboo garden of Kerala Forest Research Institute at Palappilli
