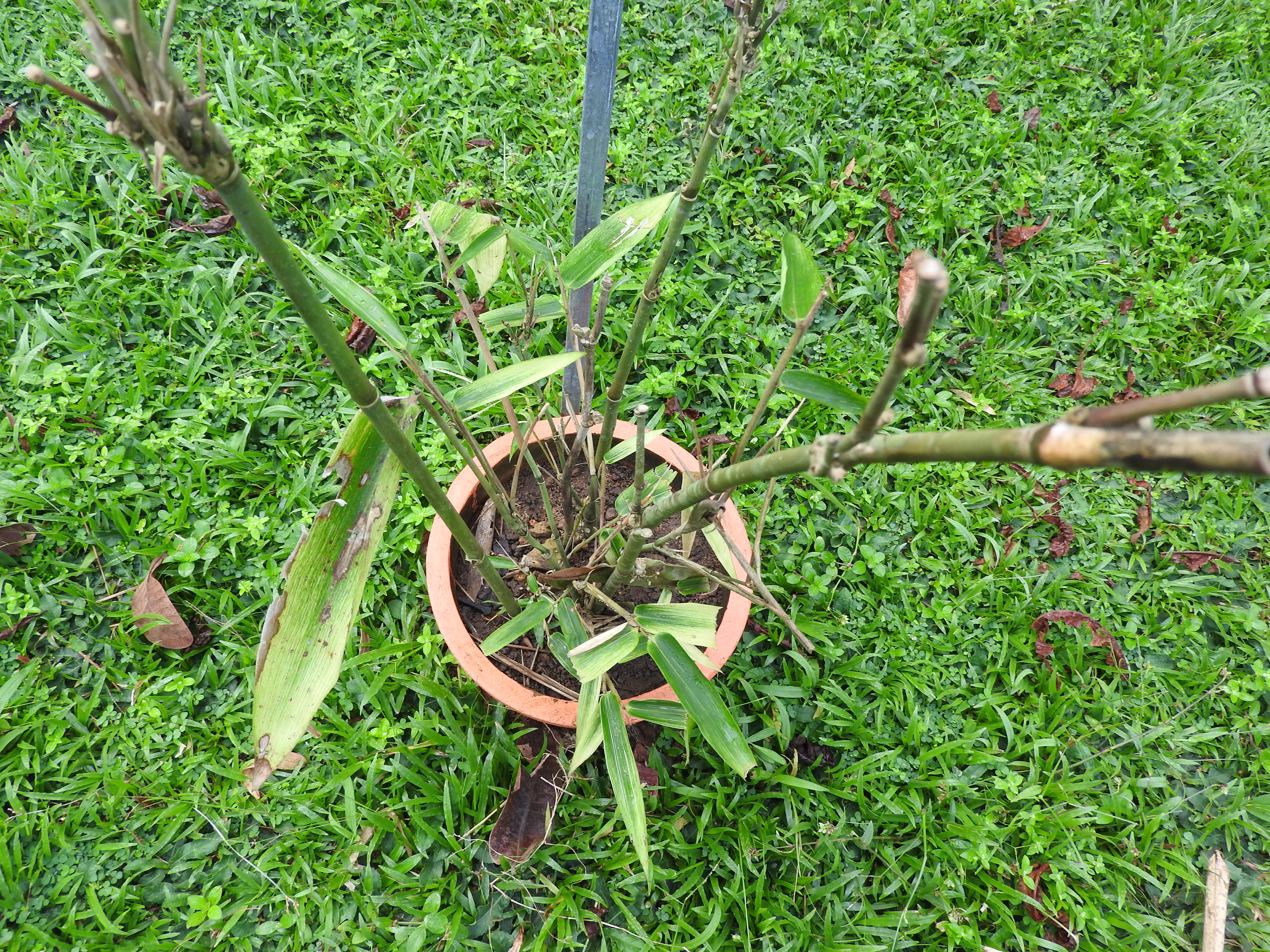

Scientific classification
- Kingdom: Plantae
- Clade: Tracheophytes
- Clade: Angiosperms
- Clade: Monocots
- Clade: Commelinids
- Order: Poales
- Family: Poaceae
- Genus: Bambusa
- Species: B. copelandii

Binomial name
- Bambusa copelandii Gamble

Synonyms
- Dendrocalamopsis copelandii (Gamble) Keng f.; Dendrocalamus copelandii (Gamble) N.H.Xia & Stapleton; Sinocalamus copelandii (Gamble) Raizada

= Bambusa copelandii =

Species of grass

Bambusa copelandii is a species of Bambusa bamboo.

== Distribution ==
Bambusa copelandii is endemic to Myanmar.

== Description ==
Bambusa copelandii grows up to a height of 1,500 to 2,000 meters. Its stem is woody and grows up to 15–19 cm. Its 6 stamens are yellow and grow up to 8 mm long.
