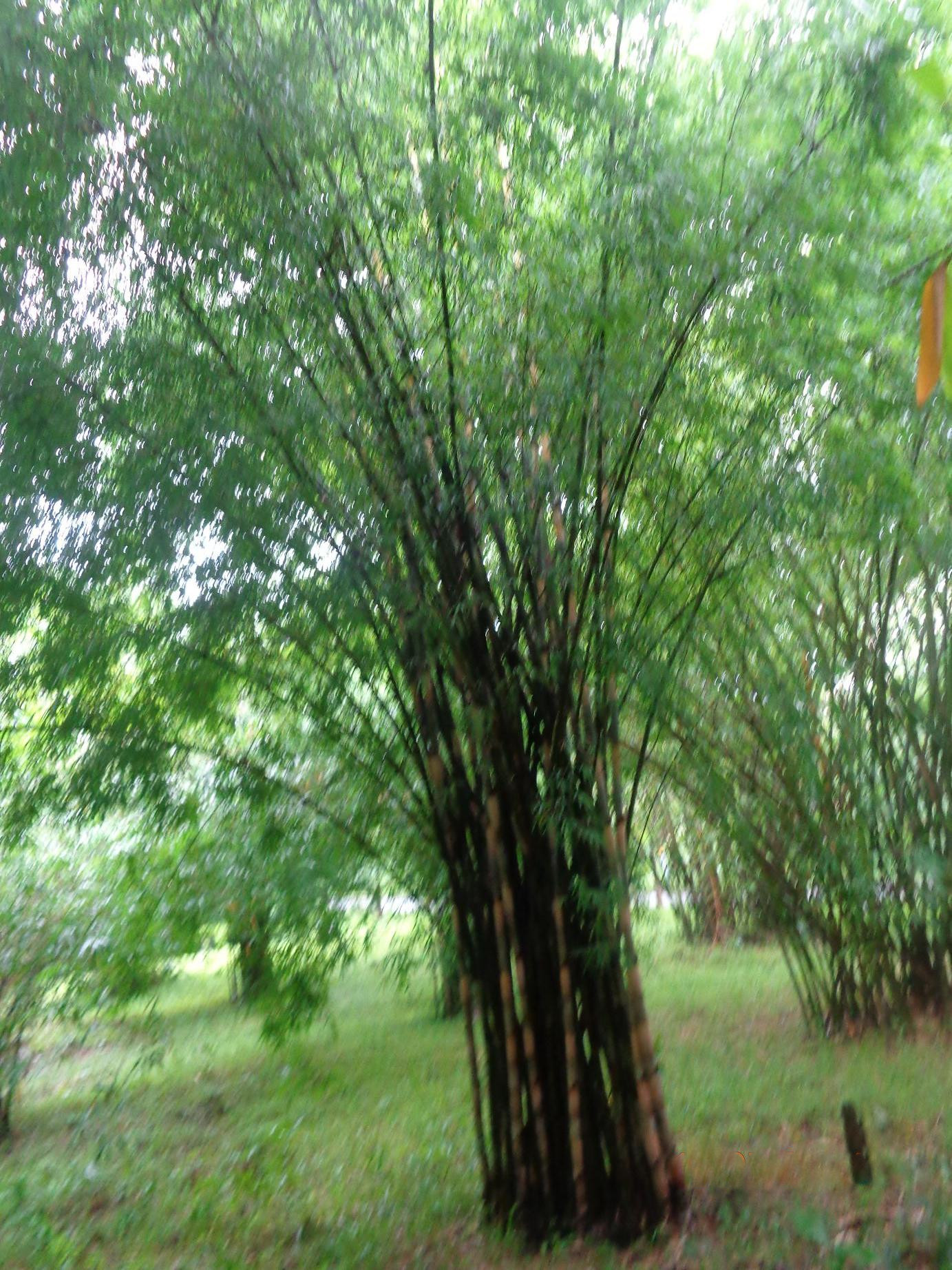

Scientific classification
- Kingdom: Plantae
- Clade: Tracheophytes
- Clade: Angiosperms
- Clade: Monocots
- Clade: Commelinids
- Order: Poales
- Family: Poaceae
- Genus: Bambusa
- Species: B. polymorpha

Binomial name
- Bambusa polymorpha Munro.

Synonyms
- Arundarbor polymorpha (Munro) Kuntze; Bambusa cyanostachya Kurz ex Gamble [Invalid]

= Bambusa polymorpha =

Burmese bamboo

Species of grass

Bambusa polymorpha, or Burmese bamboo, is a species of clumping bamboo native to Bangladesh, China, Laos, Myanmar, Thailand, India, Sri Lanka, Java, and has been naturalized in Cuba, Puerto Rico, and Ecuador.

== Habit ==
It is a tall, grayish green colored bamboo species, which grows in thickets consisting of a large number of heavily branched, closely growing culms. It reaches a height of 10–30 m.

== Appearance ==
Culms are green, covered with whitish brown hair, and become brownish green when drying. Young shoots are greenish brown in color. Branching occurs from the mid-culm to the top. Aerial roots reach up to few nodes above ground.

Young culm sheaths are greenish, which become yellowish brown when mature. Sheaths of growing shoots are golden yellow color, with cup-shaped blades. The sheath proper is 20–25 cm in length and 28–35 cm wide. Blade length is 5–10 cm. Auricles are equal, sickle-shaped, wavy, and curled. Upper surfaces of the sheaths are covered with brownish-black, closely pressed hairs. Lower surfaces of the sheaths are not hairy. Sheaths do not fall early, but blades fall.

== Uses ==
In India, it is used for walls, partitions, troughs, and mats. In Myanmar, it is used for making house frames, wattle-and-daub walls, partitions, concrete reinforcement, and ceilings. The young shoots are eaten, and taste very bitter.
