= Dendrocalamus sinicus =

Scientific classification
- Kingdom: Plantae
- Clade: Embryophytes
- Clade: Tracheophytes
- Clade: Angiosperms
- Clade: Monocots
- Clade: Commelinids
- Order: Poales
- Family: Poaceae
- Genus: Dendrocalamus
- Species: D. sinicus

Binomial name
- Dendrocalamus sinicus L.C.Chia & J.L.Sun

Species of grass

Dendrocalamus sinicus, the dragon bamboo, is a gigantic clumping bamboo native to Yunnan Province of China and to Laos. It has the largest culms of any known species of bamboo; up to 36 cm (14 in) wide with culm walls up to 6 centimetres (2.4 in) thick and the culm up to 46 m (151 ft) height. Each culm can weigh up to 450 kg (990 lb) apiece. A plant eventually consists of about one hundred culms. The species was first reported in 1982.
