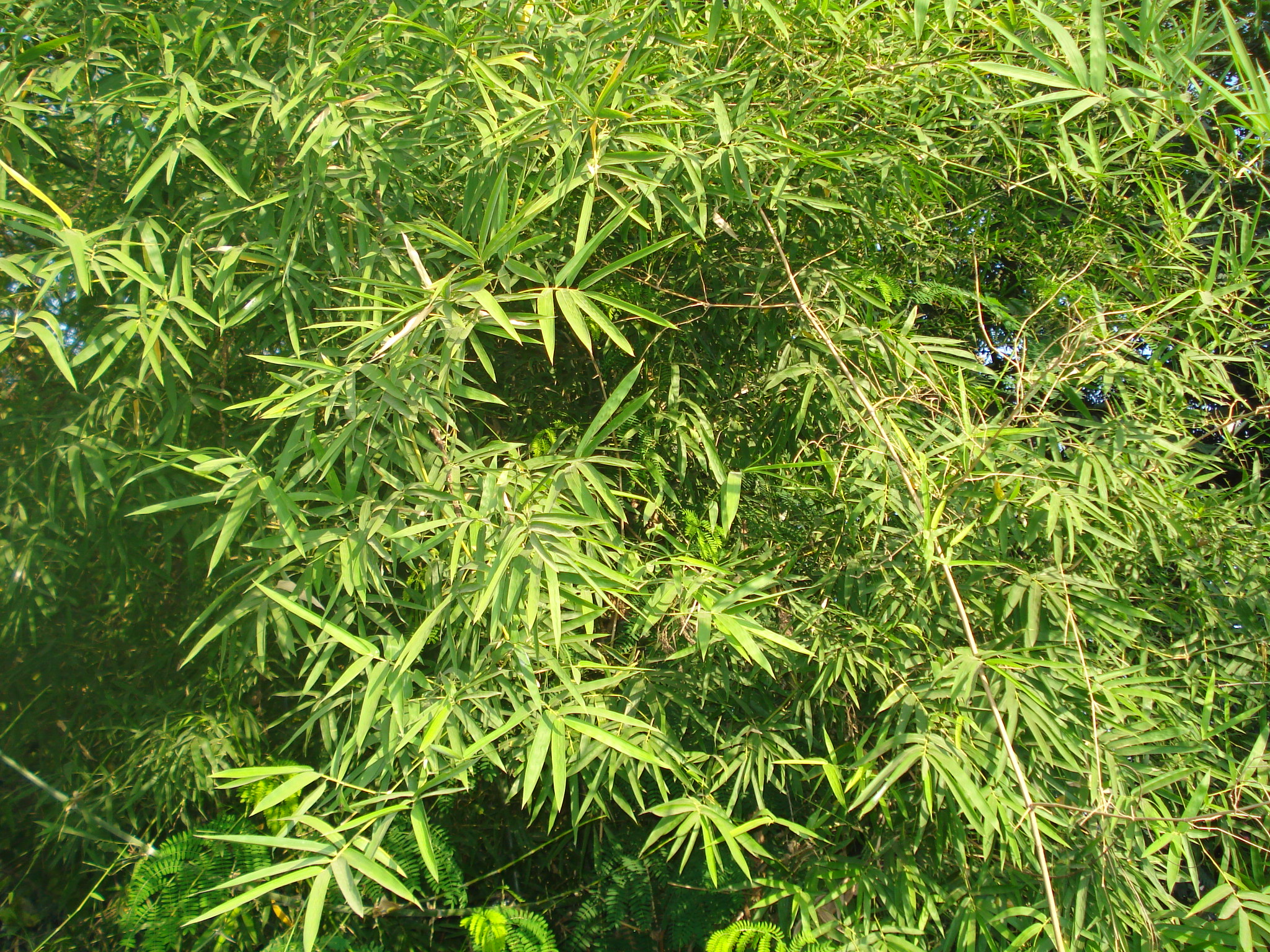

Scientific classification
- Kingdom: Plantae
- Clade: Tracheophytes
- Clade: Angiosperms
- Clade: Monocots
- Clade: Commelinids
- Order: Poales
- Family: Poaceae
- Genus: Dendrocalamus
- Species: D. strictus

Binomial name
- Dendrocalamus strictus (Roxb.) Nees

Synonyms
- Arundo hexandra Roxb. ex Munro nom. inval.; Bambos stricta Roxb.; Bambusa glomerata Royle ex Munro nom. inval.; Bambusa hexandra Roxb. ex Munro nom. inval.; Bambusa pubescens Lodd. ex Lindl.; Bambusa stricta (Roxb.) Roxb.; Bambusa tanaea Buch.-Ham. ex Wall. nom. inval.; Bambusa verticillata Rottler ex Munro nom. inval.; Dendrocalamus prainiana Varmah & Bahadur nom. inval.; Nastus strictus (Roxb.) Sm.

= Dendrocalamus strictus =

Species of grass

Dendrocalamus strictus is a tropical bamboo species belonging to the Dendrocalamus genus. The culms (stems) are often solid. Common names include male bamboo, solid bamboo, and Calcutta bamboo.

== Habit ==
It is a tall, dull long green-colored bamboo species that grows in thickets consisting of many heavily branched, closely growing culms. It reaches a height of 6–18 m.

== Appearance ==
Culms are green and covered with white blooms, which become dull green when mature and turn brown on drying. Young shoots are brown in color and covered with white blooms. Culms are straight. Branching occurs from the base to mid-culm. Aerial roots reach up to a few nodes above the ground. Internode length is 20–30 cm, and diameter is 2.5–12 cm. Culm walls are very thick. Nodes are not prominent.

Culm sheaths are green in young, and turn brown when mature, and are cylindrical. The sheath proper is 18–22 cm in length and 10–17 cm wide. Blade length is 3.5–6.5 cm. Auricles are absent. The upper surfaces of the sheath may or may not be covered with brown hairs. The lower surfaces of the sheath are not hairy. Sheaths fall early.

== Distribution and habitat ==
It is native to Tropical Asia in humid areas including Pakistan, Western Himalayas, Eastern Himalayas, India, Nepal, Myanmar, Thailand, Laos, Cambodia and Vietnam. It is found from moist broadleaf forests to dry deciduous forests.

== Introduced areas ==
They have been introduced in other Tropical places like Bangladesh, Sri Lanka, Java, Southeast Brazil, Togo, Puerto Rico, the Caribbean, Democratic Republic of the Congo, Madagascar, South China, Taiwan and other areas.

== Uses ==
They are used for making house frames, rafters, tent poles, concrete reinforcement, walls, scaffolding, and fences. The leaves are used for thatching. Used by the British army in India for making lance shafts.
