= Elizabeth A. Widjaja =

Botanist

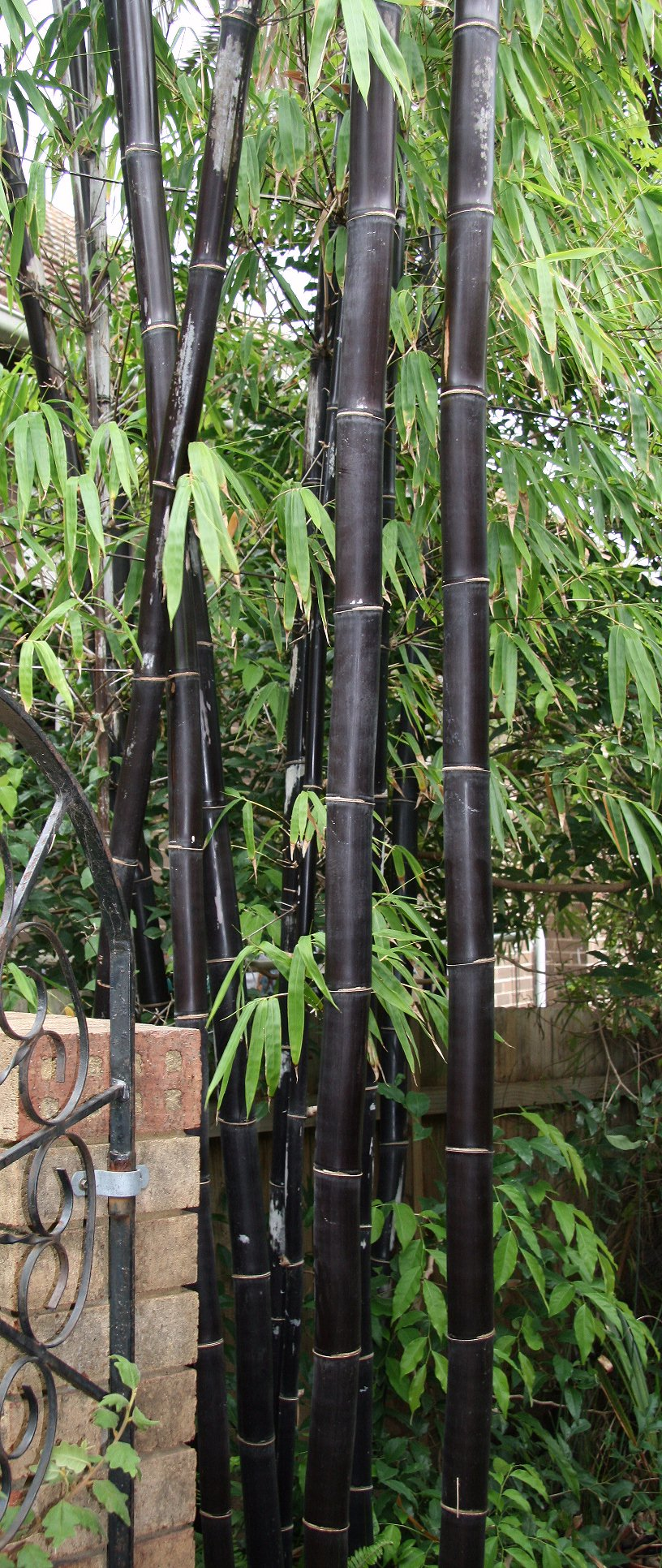
Bambusa lako, in Sydney

Elizabeth Anita Widjaja (born 1951) is a Senior Principal Researcher of bamboo taxonomy at the Herbarium Bogoriense, Botany Division, Biological Research Centre at the Indonesian Institute of Sciences in Bogor, Indonesia. She is especially interested in Indonesian bamboo and Malesian bamboo generally, and promotes the cultivation of bamboo for the prevention of erosion.

Widjaja said, of bamboo as a source of biofuel, that:

It is an overwhelming source. Furthermore, it is easy to work with bamboo so research about bamboo-based biofuel should be cheaper.

Bambusa lako (Timor black bamboo) was described and separated from the Indonesian black bamboo species Gigantochloa atroviolacea by Professor Widjaja in 1997, as its appearance (morphology) differed.

== Books ==
- Identikit jenis-jenis bambu di Jawa (Bamboo varieties found on Java) w/Kartikasari, S. N. (Sri Nurani), 2001, ISBN 979-579-035-8
- Identikit jenis-jenis bambu di Kepulauan Sunda Kecil (Bamboo varieties of the Lesser Sunda Islands) w/Kartikasari, S. N. (Sri Nurani), 2001, ISBN 979-579-034-X

== Awards ==
- World Biodiversity Day Award, 1999, by the Indonesian State Ministry of Environment
- Indonesian President Award, 2000
- Harsberger Medal, for ethnobotanical studies (by the Society of the Ethnobotanist, India), 2001
