= Andreas Voss (botanist) =

German botanist and horticulturist (1857-1924)

Andreas Voss (12 March 1857 – 9 April 1924) was a German botanist and horticulturist.

From 1878 to 1882 he worked as a gardener at the agricultural school in Hildesheim. From 1890 onward, he worked as an independent author. He was editor of the horticultural publication Der Deutsche Gartenrat.

He was the author of a popular botanical dictionary for gardeners, titled Botanisches Hilfs- und Wörterbuch (6th edition, 1922). He also edited the third edition of Vilmorin's Blumengärtnerei (1896). Other noted works by Voss include:

- Gründzüge der Gartenkultur; Wachstumsbedingungen, Bodenbereitung, Anzucht, Schnitt und Schutz, 1894 – Foundations of garden culture; growth conditions, soil preparation, breeding, cutting and protection.
- Wörterbuch der deutschen pflanzennamen, wild, nutz- und zierpflanzen des freilandes und der gewächshäuser, 1922 – Dictionary of German plant names, wild, useful and ornamental plants of the field and the greenhouses.

The botanical genus Vossianthus (synonym Sparrmannia) was named after him by Otto Kuntze.
