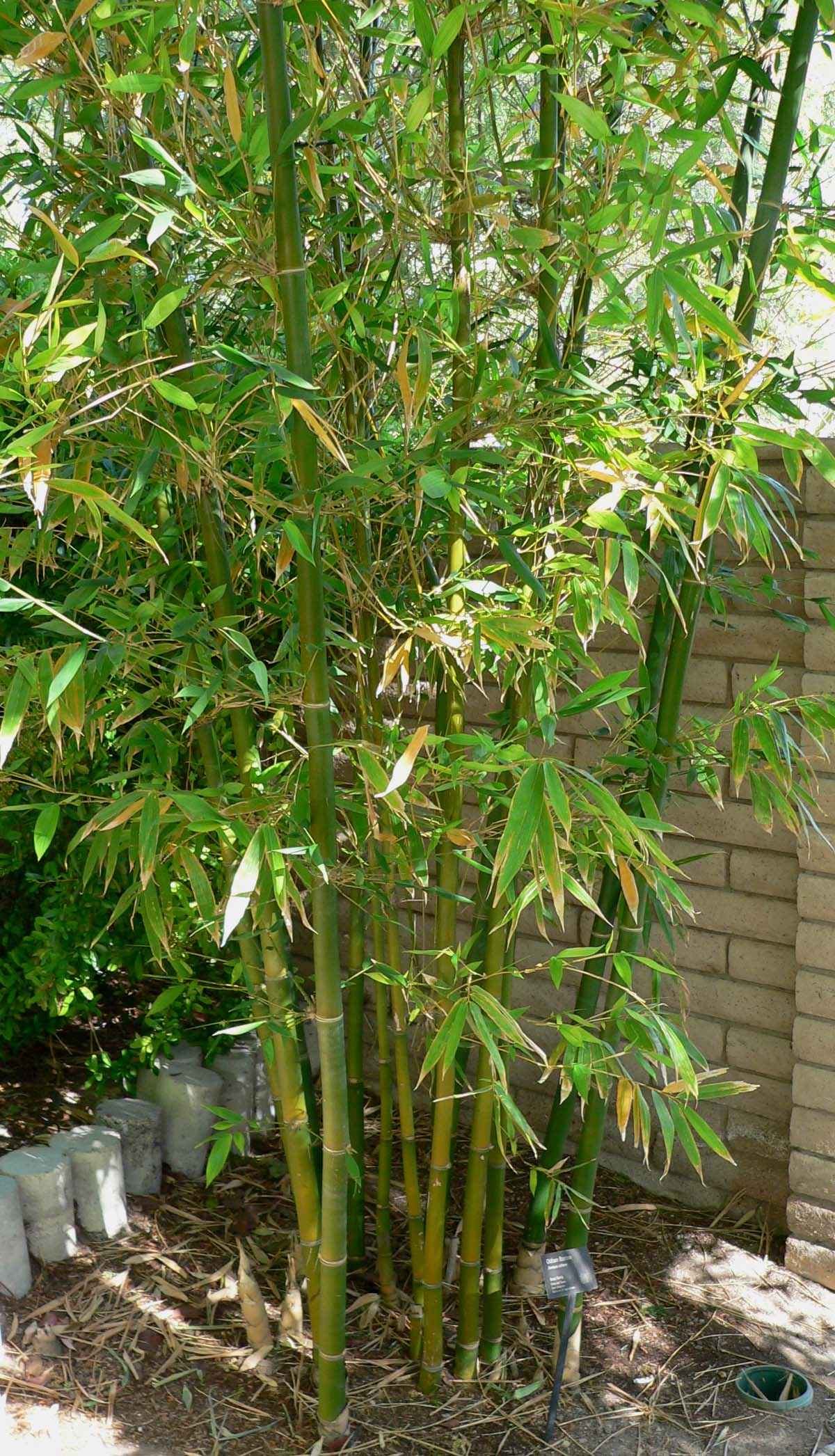
- Bambusa oldhamii

Scientific classification
- Kingdom: Plantae
- Clade: Tracheophytes
- Clade: Angiosperms
- Clade: Monocots
- Clade: Commelinids
- Order: Poales
- Family: Poaceae
- Subfamily: Bambusoideae
- Tribe: Bambuseae
- Subtribe: Bambusinae
- Genus: Bambusa; Schreb.

Type species
- Bambusa bambos (L.) Voss

Synonyms
- Arundarbor Kuntze; Bambos Retz.; Bambus J. F. Gmel.; Dendrocalamopsis (L.C.Chia & H.L.Fung) Q.H.Dai & X.L.Tao; Dendrocalamopsis Q.H.Dai & X.L.Tao; Ischurochloa Büse; Leleba Nakai; Lingnania McClure; Tetragonocalamus Nakai; Neosinocalamus Keng f.; Pseudobambusa T.Q.Nguyen

= Bambusa =

Genus of grasses

Bambusa is a large genus of clumping bamboos. Most species of Bambusa are rather large, with numerous branches emerging from the nodes, and one or two much larger than the rest. The branches can be as long as 11 m (35 ft).

They are native to Southeast Asia, South Asia, China, Taiwan, the Himalayas, New Guinea, Melanesia, and the Northern Territory of Australia. They are also reportedly naturalized in other regions, e.g. Africa, Americas, and various oceanic islands.

== Species ==
As of December 2025, Plants of the World Online accepts the following 151 species:

- Bambusa affinis Munro
- Bambusa albolineata L.C.Chia
- Bambusa alemtemshii H.B.Naithani
- Bambusa amplexicaulis W.T.Lin & Z.M.Wu
- Bambusa angustiaurita W.T.Lin
- Bambusa angustissima L.C.Chia & H.L.Fung
- Bambusa arnhemica F.Muell.
- Bambusa aurinuda McClure
- Bambusa australis L.C.Chia & H.L.Fung
- Bambusa balcooa Roxb.
- Bambusa bambos (L.) Voss
- Bambusa barpatharica Borthakur & Barooah
- Bambusa basihirsuta McClure
- Bambusa basihirsutoides N.H.Xia
- Bambusa basisolida W.T.Lin
- Bambusa beecheyana Munro
- Bambusa bicicatricata (W.T.Lin) L.C.Chia & H.L.Fung
- Bambusa binghamii Gamble
- Bambusa boniopsis McClure
- Bambusa brevispicula Holttum
- Bambusa brunneoaciculia G.A.Fu
- Bambusa burmanica Gamble
- Bambusa cacharensis R.B.Majumdar
- Bambusa cerosissima McClure
- Bambusa chungii McClure
- Bambusa chunii L.C.Chia & H.L.Fung
- Bambusa clavata Stapleton
- Bambusa comillensis Alam
- Bambusa concava W.T.Lin
- Bambusa contracta L.C.Chia & H.L.Fung
- Bambusa copelandii Gamble
- Bambusa corniculata L.C.Chia & H.L.Fung
- Bambusa cornigera McClure
- Bambusa crispiaurita W.T.Lin & Z.M.Wu
- Bambusa dahuazhu T.P.Yi & B.X.Li
- Bambusa dampaeana H.B.Naithani, Garbyal & N.S.Bisht
- Bambusa deformis T.P.Yi & Lin Yang
- Bambusa diaoluoshanensis L.C.Chia & H.L.Fung
- Bambusa dissimulator McClure
- Bambusa distegia (Keng & Keng f.) L.C.Chia & H.L.Fung
- Bambusa dolichoclada Hayata
- Bambusa duriuscula W.T.Lin
- Bambusa emeiensis L.C.Chia & H.L.Fung
- Bambusa eutuldoides McClure
- Bambusa excurrensa G.A.Fu
- Bambusa farinacea K.M.Wong
- Bambusa fimbriligulata McClure
- Bambusa flexuosa Munro
- Bambusa fruticosa Holttum
- Bambusa funghomii McClure
- Bambusa garuchokua Barooah & Borthakur
- Bambusa gibba McClure
- Bambusa gibboides W.T.Lin
- Bambusa glabrovagina G.A.Fu
- Bambusa glaucophylla Widjaja
- Bambusa grandis (Q.H.Dai & X.L.Tao) Ohrnb.
- Bambusa griffithiana Munro
- Bambusa guangxiensis L.C.Chia & H.L.Fung
- Bambusa gurgandii K.M.Wong & Diep
- Bambusa hainanensis L.C.Chia & H.L.Fung
- Bambusa heterostachya (Munro) Holttum
- Bambusa hirticaulis R.S.Lin
- Bambusa indigena L.C.Chia & H.L.Fung
- Bambusa insularis L.C.Chia & H.L.Fung
- Bambusa intermedia Hsueh f. & T.P.Yi
- Bambusa jacobsii Widjaja
- Bambusa jaintiana R.B.Majumdar
- Bambusa khasiana Munro
- Bambusa kingiana Gamble
- Bambusa kyathaungtu E.G.Camus
- Bambusa lapidea McClure
- Bambusa latideltata W.T.Lin
- Bambusa laxa K.M.Wong
- Bambusa lenta L.C.Chia
- Bambusa liangzhiana N.H.Xia, J.B.Ni & Y.H.Tong
- Bambusa lituiformis W.Arthan, Teerawat. & Sungkaew
- Bambusa longipalea W.T.Lin
- Bambusa longispiculata Gamble
- Bambusa macrolemma Holttum
- Bambusa macrotis L.C.Chia & H.L.Fung
- Bambusa maculata Widjaja
- Bambusa majumdarii P.Kumari & P.Singh
- Bambusa malingensis McClure
- Bambusa manipureana H.B.Naithani & N.S.Bisht
- Bambusa marginata Munro
- Bambusa merrillii Gamble
- Bambusa mohanramii P.Kumari & P.Singh
- Bambusa mollis L.C.Chia & H.L.Fung
- Bambusa multiplex (Lour.) Raeusch. ex Schult.f.
- Bambusa mutabilis McClure
- Bambusa nairiana P.Kumari & P.Singh
- Bambusa nepalensis Stapleton
- Bambusa nghiana V.T.Tran
- Bambusa nutans Wall. ex Munro
- Bambusa odashimae Hatus. ex Ohrnb.
- Bambusa oldhamii Munro
- Bambusa oliveriana Gamble
- Bambusa ooh Widjaja & Astuti
- Bambusa pachinensis Hayata
- Bambusa pallida Munro
- Bambusa papillata (Q.H.Dai) K.M.Lan
- Bambusa papillatoides Q.H.Dai & D.Y.Huang
- Bambusa pervariabilis McClure
- Bambusa pierreana E.G.Camus
- Bambusa piscatorum McClure
- Bambusa polymorpha Munro
- Bambusa procera A.Chev. & A.Camus
- Bambusa prominens H.L.Fung & C.Y.Sia
- Bambusa pseudopallida R.B.Majumdar
- Bambusa purpurovagian G.A.Fu
- Bambusa ramispinosa L.C.Chia & H.L.Fung
- Bambusa rectocuneata (W.T.Lin) N.H.Xia, R.S.Lin & R.H.Wang
- Bambusa remotiflora (Kuntze) L.C.Chia & H.L.Fung
- Bambusa riauensis Widjaja
- Bambusa rigida Keng & Keng f.
- Bambusa riparia Holttum
- Bambusa rongchengensis (T.P.Yi & C.Y.Sia) D.Z.Li
- Bambusa rugata (W.T.Lin) Ohrnb.
- Bambusa rutila McClure
- Bambusa salarkhanii Alam
- Bambusa semitecta W.T.Lin & Z.M.Wu
- Bambusa sesquiflora (McClure) L.C.Chia & H.L.Fung
- Bambusa sinospinosa McClure
- Bambusa solida Munro ex Becc.
- Bambusa solomonensis Holttum
- Bambusa spinosa Roxb.
- Bambusa stenoaurita (W.T.Lin) T.H.Wen
- Bambusa striatomaculata G.A.Fu
- Bambusa subaequalis H.L.Fung & C.Y.Sia
- Bambusa subtruncata L.C.Chia & H.L.Fung
- Bambusa suijiangensis J.B.Ni, Z.Y.Niu & Y.H.Tong
- Bambusa surrecta (Q.H.Dai) Q.H.Dai
- Bambusa tabacaria (Lour.) Steud.
- Bambusa teres Buch.-Ham. ex Munro
- Bambusa textilis McClure
- Bambusa transvenula (W.T.Lin & Z.J.Feng) N.H.Xia
- Bambusa truncata B.M.Yang
- Bambusa tsangii McClure
- Bambusa tulda Roxb.
- Bambusa tuldoides Munro
- Bambusa utilis W.C.Lin
- Bambusa valida (Q.H.Dai) W.T.Lin
- Bambusa variostriata (W.T.Lin) L.C.Chia & H.L.Fung
- Bambusa ventricosa McClure
- Bambusa villosula Kurz
- Bambusa vinhphuensis T.Q.Nguyen
- Bambusa viridis Widjaja
- Bambusa vulgaris Schrad. ex J.C.Wendl.
- Bambusa wenchouensis (T.H.Wen) Keng f. ex Q.F.Zheng, Y.M.Lin
- Bambusa xiashanensis L.C.Chia & H.L.Fung
- Bambusa xueana Ohrnb.
- Bambusa xueliniana R.S.Lin & C.H.Zheng

Note: now placed in Pseudobambusa:

- B. schizostachyoides Kurz ex Gamble – Myanmar, Vietnam, Andaman Islands

== Fossil record ==
Fossil leaves of †Bambusa ilinskiae are described from the Miocene deposits of the Carpathians. The fossil leaves of †Bambusa lugdunensis are known mainly from the Miocene of the Massif du Coiron in Ardèche, France, Miocene of Bełchatów in Poland, Middle Miocene of Austria, the Neogene of the Transcarpathians and the Pliocene of southern France. Findings of fossil Bambusa leaf impressions of Messinian age (ca. 5.7 Ma) from Monte Tondo in the Romagna Apennines in northern Italy, are similar to fossil †Bambusa lugdunensis leaves.

== See also ==
- Domesticated plants and animals of Austronesia
