= Sahni =

Sahni, Sahani, Sawhney, or Sahney is an Indian surname found among the Bihari, Khatri Hindus and Sikhs of Punjab, India. It is also used by people from Bihari, Uttar Pradesh and parts of Central India.

Notable people with the surname include:

== Punjab, India ==
- Anuj Sawhney (born 1981), Indian actor in Hindi cinema
- Anuradha Sawhney, Indian animal rights activist
- Ajai Sahni, Indian expert on counter-terrorism
- Ajay Prakash Sawhney, Indian civil servant (Secretary, MEITy, 2016–2022)
- Baljit Sahni (born 1987), Indian football player
- Balraj Sahni (1913–1973), Indian actor in Hindi cinema
- Balvinder Singh Sahni (born 1972), Indian businessman
- Bhisham Sahni (1915–2003), Indian Hindi writer, playwright, and actor; brother of Balraj Sahni
- Birbal Sahni (1891–1949), Indian paleobotanist
- Bodh Raj Sawhney, Indian judge
- Daya Ram Sahni (1879–1939), Indian archaeologist
- Harpreet Sawhney, Indian-American electrical engineer
- Indira Sawhney, Indian petitioner
- Jagdish Sahni (1944–2021), Indian politician
- Jaideep Sahni (born 1968), Indian screenwriter, songwriter, and film producer
- Karan Sawhney (born 1992), Indian footballer
- Kidar Nath Sahani (1926–2012), Indian politician
- Mohanbir Sawhney, Indian business theorist, professor at Kellogg School of Management
- Naina Sahni, Indian murder victim
- Nakul Singh Sawhney, Indian documentary filmmaker
- Nilam Sawhney, Indian civil servant (former Chief Secretary, Andhra Pradesh)
- Nitin Sawhney (born 1964), British-Indian musician and composer
- Parikshit Sahni (born 1940), Indian actor, son of Balraj Sahni
- Parlad Singh Sawhney, Indian politician
- Prem Nath Sahni (1916–1990), Indian administrator
- Pritam Singh Sahni (1924–2008), Indian poet in the Punjabi-language
- Rajan Sawhney (born 1970/71), Indian-Canadian politician
- Ravi Sawhney, Indian-American industrial designer
- Ruchi Ram Sahni (1863–1948), Indian scientist and educator
- Savitri Sahni (1902–1985), Indian paleobotanist
- S. K. Sahni, Indian Army lieutenant-general
- Sartaj Sahni, Indian-American computer scientist
- Sonia Sahni, Indian actress
- Suryakant Sawhney, known as Lifafa, Indian musician
- Varun Sahni (born 1956), Indian theoretical physicist
- Vikramjit Singh Sahney (born 1962), Indian entrepreneur and social worker

== Other parts of India ==
- Akhilesh Sahani (born 1994), Indian cricketer
- Alaka Sahani (born 1974), Indian film critic and editor
- Anil Kumar Sahani (born 1963), Indian politician
- Arjun Sahani, Indian politician
- Chandan Sahani (born 1998), Indian cricketer
- Hari Sahni, Indian politician
- Harvindar Kumar Sahani (born 1965), Indian politician
- Jubba Sahni (1906–1944), Indian revolutionary
- Mahendra Sahni, Indian politician
- Madan Sahni, Indian politician
- Mukesh Sahani, Indian politician
- Om Sahani, Indian actor
- Parth Sahani (born 1993), Indian cricketer
- Sahani Upendra Pal Singh (1930–2021), Indian writer in the Nagpuri-language
- Swarab Sahani (born 2002), Indian cricketer
- Ramchandra Sahani, Indian politician

== See also ==
- Sahni, Punjab, a village near Lakhpur, India
