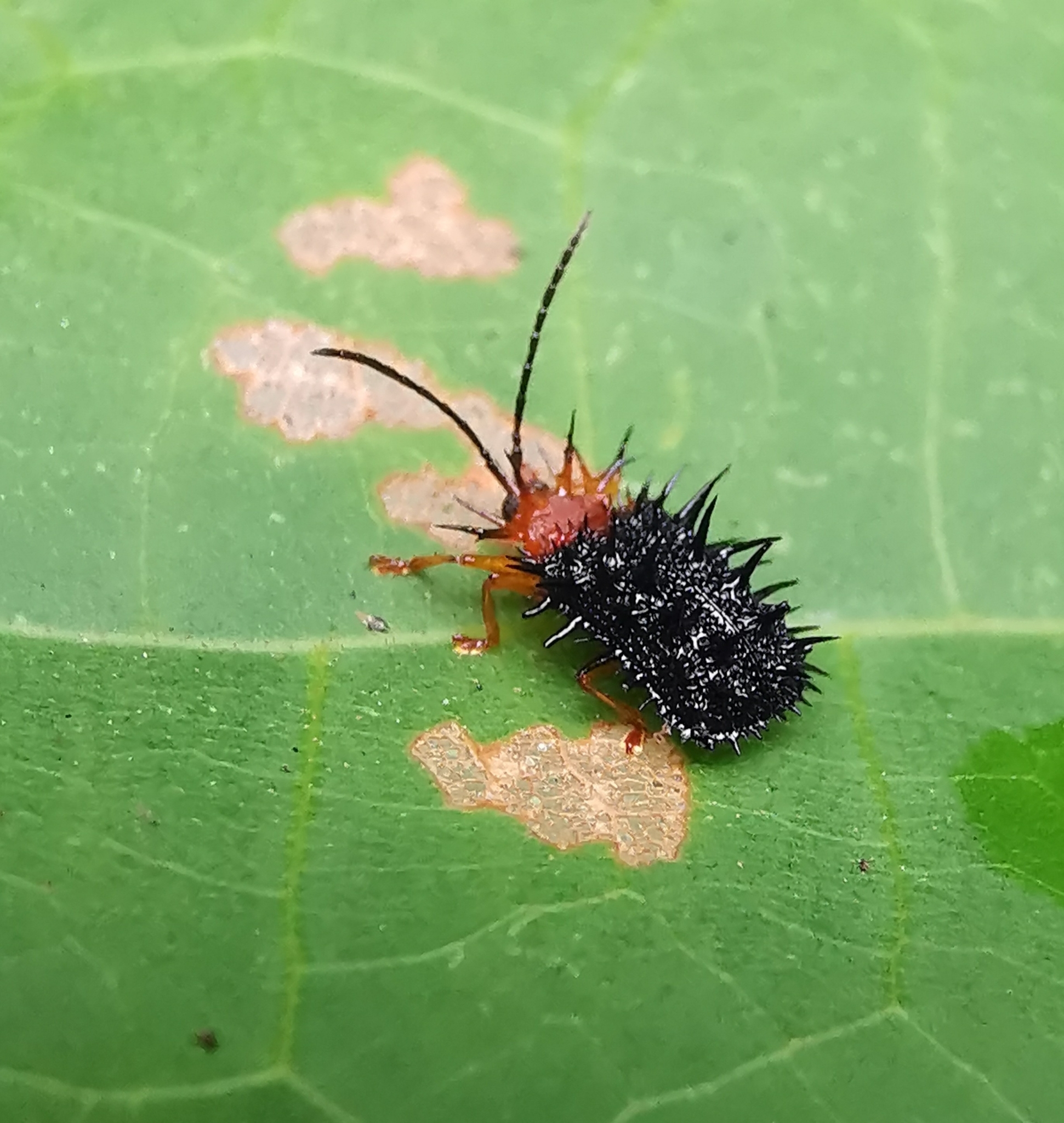

Scientific classification
- Kingdom: Animalia
- Phylum: Arthropoda
- Clade: Pancrustacea
- Class: Insecta
- Order: Coleoptera
- Suborder: Polyphaga
- Infraorder: Cucujiformia
- Family: Chrysomelidae
- Genus: Dactylispa
- Species: D. bipartita

Binomial name
- Dactylispa bipartita (Guérin-Méneville, 1830)

Synonyms
- Hispa bipartita Guérin-Méneville, 1830

= Dactylispa bipartita =

Species of beetle

Dactylispa bipartita is a species of beetle of the family Chrysomelidae. It is found in Indonesia (Borneo, Java, Nias, Sumatra), Malaysia, Singapore and the Philippines (Luzon, Mindanao, Palawan).

The recorded host plants for this species are Saccharum spontaneum, Bambusa blumeana and Sterculia species.
