= Savitri Sahni =

Indian paleobotanist

- Savitri Sahni, from a 1949 photograph.
- Born: Savitri Suri; 19 September 1902
- Died: 26 April 1985 (aged 82); Lucknow
- Occupation: President of Birbal Sahni Institute of Palaeosciences (1949-1969)
- Spouse: Birbal Sahni (m. 1920)
- Relatives: Ruchi Ram Sahni (father-in-law)

Savitri Sahni (19 September 1902 – 26 April 1985), born Savitri Suri, was president of the Birbal Sahni Institute of Paleosciences from 1949 to 1969.

== Early life ==
Savitri Suri was born in 1902, the daughter of Rai Bahadar Sundar Das Suri, a school inspector in Lahore. Her father and Ruchi Ram Sahni were colleagues in Lahore.

== Career ==
Sahni joined her botanist husband on collecting trips through the Himalayas and Kashmir. After his sudden death in 1949, she became head of the new Birbal Sahni Institute of Paleosciences at Lucknow, and continued as the Institute's president for twenty years, until 1969. She was also first president of the Paleobotanical Society of India. She was a member of the council of India's National Academy of Sciences.

Savitri Sahni was awarded the Padma Shri in 1969, for her services to science.

== Personal life ==
Savitri Suri married paleobotanist Birbal Sahni in 1920. His father was Ruchi Ram Sahni. She was widowed when Sahni died in 1949, and thereafter wore only white silk, a symbol of her widowhood.

Savitri Sahni died in 1985, aged 82 years, at Lucknow. Her home, designed by American architect Walter Burley Griffin, became a museum; her estate was left to the Birbal-Savitri Sahni Foundation in Lucknow, to fund the museum, a lecture series, fellowships for researchers, and awards for scientific achievement.
