= Dactylispa infuscata =

Scientific classification
- Kingdom: Animalia
- Phylum: Arthropoda
- Class: Insecta
- Order: Coleoptera
- Suborder: Polyphaga
- Infraorder: Cucujiformia
- Family: Chrysomelidae
- Genus: Dactylispa
- Species: D. infuscata

Binomial name
- Dactylispa infuscata (Chapuis, 1876)

Synonyms
- Hispa infuscata Chapuis, 1876; Dactylispa infuscata notata Uhmann, 1964

Species of beetle

Dactylispa infuscata is a species of beetle of the family Chrysomelidae. It is found in the Philippines (Bajol, Basilan, Bohol, Bucas, Leyte, Luzon, Mindanao, Mindoro, Negros, Panaon, Samar).

== Life history ==
The recorded host plant for this species is Bambusa blumeana.
