= Manipur Ice Age bamboo fossil =

Ice Age bamboo fossil from Manipur
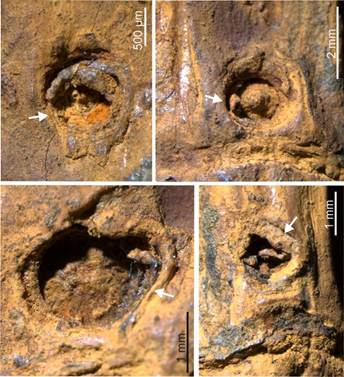
- Common name: Ice Age bamboo fossil from Manipur
- Species: Chimonobambusa manipurensis
- Age: 37,000-year-old
- Place discovered: silt-rich deposits along the Chirang River
- Date discovered: 2021-2022
- Discovered by: Birbal Sahni Institute of Palaeosciences (BSIP)
- The image shows the enlarged microscopic view of the 37,000-year-old fossil bamboo (Chimonobambusa manipurensis), showing rare preservation of thorn scars (white arrows), discovered in the Imphal Valley, Kangleipak (Manipur)

The Ice Age bamboo fossil from Manipur is a 37,000-year-old fossil bamboo stem specimen discovered in the Imphal Valley of Manipur, India. Found in silt-rich deposits along the Chirang River, the fossil is the earliest known evidence of thorny bamboo in Asia. Its exceptional preservation provides insight into bamboo evolution and survival during the Ice Age.

== Discovery ==
The fossil was discovered by researchers from the Birbal Sahni Institute of Palaeosciences (BSIP), an autonomous institute under the Department of Science and Technology, during field surveys in the Imphal Valley of Manipur. The bamboo stem was found among fossil plant remains in the deposits of the Chirang River and was noted for its unusual surface markings and intact structure.

== Fossil description ==
The bamboo stem shows rare preservation of structural features, including nodes, buds, and scars left by thorns. Bamboo fossils are uncommon because their hollow stems and fibrous tissues decay rapidly, leaving little trace in the geological record. The preservation of thorn scars is especially rare and provided key evidence for identification.

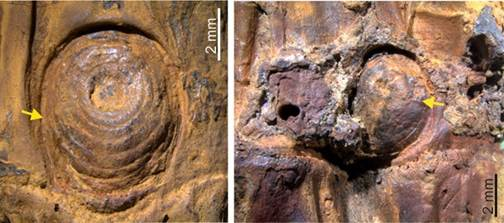
Enlarged microscopic view of the 37,000-year-old fossil bamboo (Chimonobambusa manipurensis), showing preserved bud (yellow arrows), found in the Imphal Valley, Kangleipak (Manipur)

== Identification and analysis ==
Detailed laboratory analysis of the fossil's morphology, including nodes, buds, and thorn scars, led researchers to assign it to the genus Chimonobambusa. Comparisons with modern thorny bamboo species such as Bambusa bambos and Chimonobambusa callosa were used to interpret its defensive characteristics and ecological role.

== Significance ==
The fossil represents the first known evidence that thorny bamboo existed in Asia during the Ice Age. Thorniness is considered a defense mechanism against herbivores. The fossil dates to a period marked by colder and drier global climates, during which bamboo disappeared from many regions, including Europe. Its presence in Northeast India indicates that the region served as a refuge where bamboo continued to survive under favorable conditions.

== Preservation and paleoenvironment ==
The fossil is notable for preserving delicate features such as thorn scars and buds, which rarely fossilize. Its condition suggests that the warm and humid climate of Northeast India during the Ice Age allowed bamboo to persist despite broader global climatic stress. The discovery highlights the role of the Indo-Burma biodiversity hotspot as an important refugium during this period.

== Publication ==
The discovery was published in the journal Review of Palaeobotany and Palynology. The research was conducted by H Bhatia, P Kumari, NH Singh, and G Srivastava.

== See also ==
- Plants in Meitei culture
- Plant tolerance to herbivory
- Inducible plant defenses against herbivory
- Plant defense against herbivory
- Community genetics
- Ecological fitting
