= Peter Cat Recording Co. =

Indian jazz band

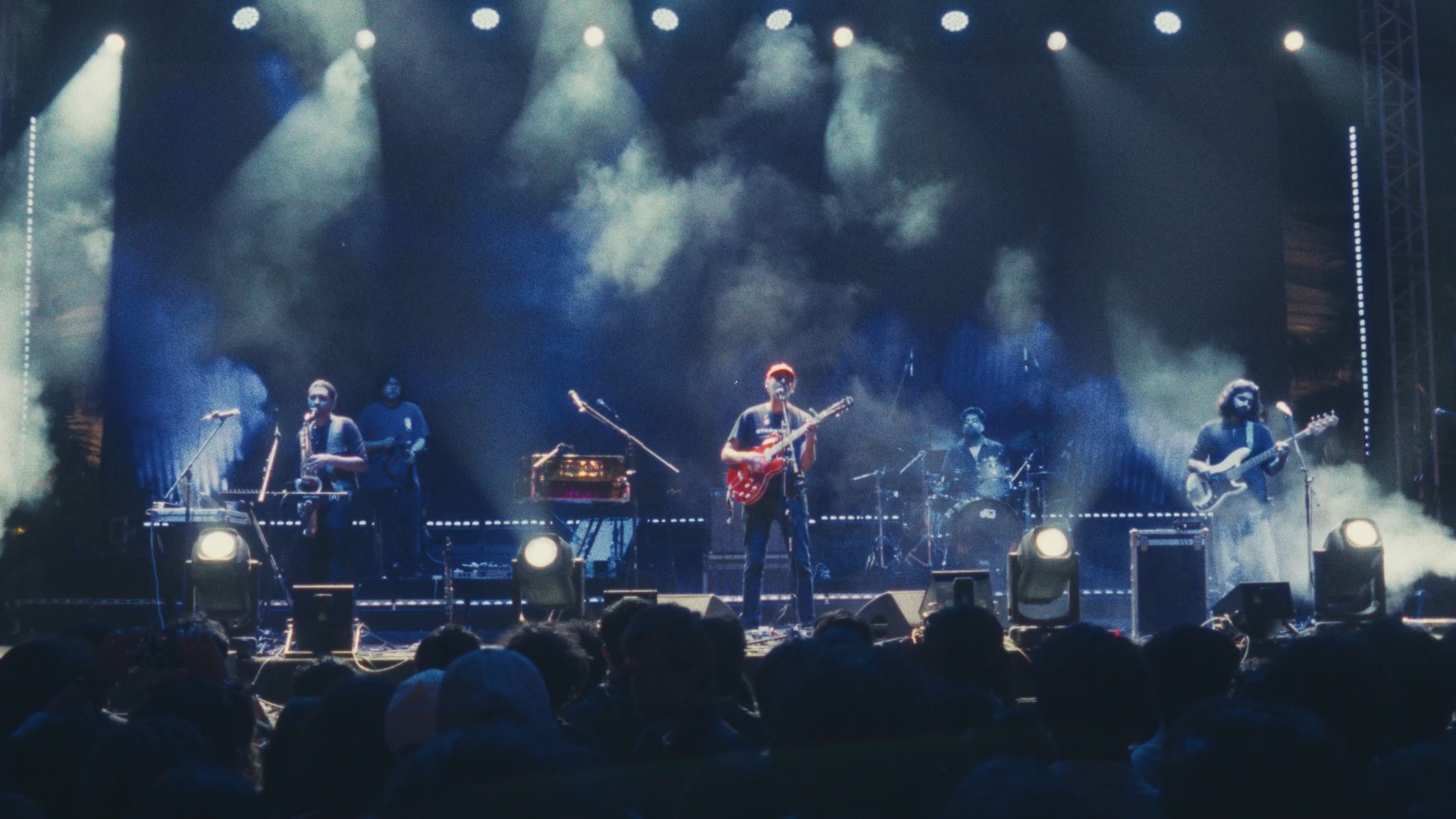
- Peter Cat Recording Co. performing in 2026

Background information
- Origin: New Delhi, India
- Genres: Alternative rock; cabaret; indie pop; Alternative Jazz
- Years active: 2009–present
- Labels: Panache; Muddy Water Records
- Members: Suryakant Sawhney; Karan Singh; Dhruv Bhola; Rohit Gupta; Kartik Sundareshan Pillai
- Past members: Rohan Kulshreshtha; Anindya Shankar
- Website: www.pcrc.in

Peter Cat Recording Co. is an Indian alternative rock band originating from Delhi. Founded in 2009, the band consists of five members: vocalist/guitarist Suryakant Sawhney, drummer Karan Singh, bassist Dhruv Bhola, keyboard/trumpet player Rohit Gupta, and multi-instrumentalist Kartik Sundareshan (keyboards, guitar, electronics and trumpet).

== History ==
=== 2008–2014: Early years ===
In 2008, Suryakant Sawhney had a spiritual experience in San Francisco which led him to believe he should seriously consider a career in music.

As Sawhney began working on material that would end up on his first album, he met Jeremy Cox of Royal Baths at a house party. Cox would go on to record and aid in the production of his band's first demos.

By early 2010, family and financial compulsions forced Sawhney to return to India, in Gurgaon. Still determined to make music (and armed with an album's worth of songs) Sawhney spent 2010 learning music production and recording. In Gurgaon, Sawhney's musical project became a quintet with the addition of local musicians Karan Singh (formerly of the metal band Lycanthropia), Rohan Kulshreshtha, and Anindya Shankar all joining Peter Cat Recording Co. During this recording period (few months wherein he lacked a drummer), one Caleb Prabhakar stepped in and tracked drums for several of the songs. By New Year's Eve of 2010, their debut album was recorded in full, with mastering beginning and finishing within the day. Sinema was released on January 1, 2011, at a house party in Delhi, through the band's website and Bandcamp. While originally priced at $2000 USD for a digital download, it was soon brought down to just US$10.

With its heady mix of jazz, cabaret, and pop, Sinema launched PCRC into the mainstream, and a promotional tour was launched. Kulshreshtha, acting as de facto band manager and booking agent, booked several shows in various Indian cities including Delhi, Mumbai, Bangalore, Chennai, Goa, and Chandigarh.

In 2011, the band released a music video for their song Love Demons. The video was produced completely in-house and starring themselves.

On January 1, 2012, exactly one year following their last album, the band released an album of raw demos and other experimental recordings, titled Wall of Want.

Anindya Shankar left the band and was replaced by guitarist Kartik Sundareshan Pillai, a friend-of-a friend who, unknown to the band at the time, was the same individual who had mixed their music at their Sinema album launch. Singh and Pillai moved residence to the rooftop of building 87a in Hauz Khas Village, Delhi, where they began launching a series of secret house party concerts until they were raided by the police and being forced to shut down. Sometime in 2014, Pillai would begin to incorporate trumpet into the band's music.

=== 2015–2018: Transmissions, Panache and Portrait of a Time ===
Five years on from their debut album, in 2015, the band launched the album's spiritual successor, Climax. The album was followed by self-produced music videos for I'm Home and Copulations. The band launched it with a show at Social in Hauz Khas Village. They proceeded to organize another tour around India, which resulted in Suryakant crashing a car during their drive from Pillai's ancestral home in Kerala to Bangalore. As a consequence, the band finished the remainder of their tour using trains and flights.

The following year, they worked on a release titled Transmissions, which relied on the band writing, recording, and producing a new song every week for two months.

By the summer of 2018, the band had been contacted by a new boutique French label, Panache, who suggested releasing a compilation on vinyl that would include music from several of their releases.

After seven years, tension in the band regarding its direction and future reached an impasse, and Kulshreshtha left the band. On Pillai's suggestion, he was replaced by 2 new, young members, Rohit Gupta and Dhruv Bhola. Portrait of a Time: 2010 – 2016 was released on March 1, 2018. This was proceeded by the band completely expunging its past and beginning again.

=== 2019–2024: Bismillah ===
Following the release of Portrait of a Time, work began on a new album. It was decided that the band would record it at Stefan Kaye's farmhouse in Sainik Farms, Delhi. The band proceeded to record most of it there, with a few songs recorded in Paris at Robin le Duc's Spectral Studios. The band debuted their new material at an all-night-long show at the Magnetic Fields Festival in Rajasthan. They partnered up with Pagal Haina who subsequently became their management.

Sawnhey and le Duc proceeded to mix the album in Paris and their latest LP Bismillah was released in 2019. The release was followed by a series of shows around India, Europe and Australasia promoting the record.

=== 2024–present: BETA बेटा ===
On 9 May 2024, the band revealed the title and artwork for their new album BETA बेटा, which was released on 9 August 2024. The band lead, Suryakant Sawhney, described the album as “a collection of stories about the future told 50 years in the past, to make sense of the present, on our only home, planet Earth", which was recorded across three continents. Alongside Sawhney's vocals, BETA बेटा also features vocal performances by band members Dhruv Bhola and Kartik Pillai. To promote their album, the band released a new single People Never Change on 16 May 2024 and announced the "Good Luck BETA '24" tour with 77 shows spanning North America, India and Europe.

== Discography ==
=== Albums ===
| Title | Details |
|---|---|
| Sinema | Released: January 1, 2011 |
| Wall of Want | Released: January 1, 2012 |
| Climax | Released: June 25, 2015 |
| Transmissions | Released: July 18, 2016 |
| Portrait of A Time | Released: March 30, 2018; Label: Panache |
| Bismillah | Released: June 7, 2019; Label: Panache |
| Happy Holidays | Released: May 11, 2020 |
| BETA बेटा | Released: August 09, 2024; Label: Muddy Water |

=== Singles ===
- "Love Demons" (Portrait of a Time; 2018)
- "I'm Home" (Portrait of a Time; 2018)
- "Copulations" (Portrait of a Time; 2018)
- "Floated By" (Bismillah; 2019)
- "Where the Money Flows" (Bismillah; 2019)
- "People Never Change" (BETA बेटा; 2024)

=== Music videos ===
- "Love Demons" (2012)
- "I'm Home" (2018)
- "Floated By" (2019)
- "Where the Money Flows" (2019)
- "We're Getting Married" (2019)
- "Copulations" (2020)
- "Suddenly" (2024)

== Band members ==
=== Current members ===
- Suryakant Sawhney – vocals, guitar (2009–present)
- Kartik Sundareshan Pillai – keyboards, guitar, electronics and trumpet (2012–present)
- Dhruv Bhola – bass and samples (2017–present)
- Karan Singh – drums (2010–present)
- Rohit Gupta – keys and trumpet (2017–present)

=== Past members ===
- Rohan Kulshreshtha (2010–2017)
- Anindya Shankar (2010–2012)
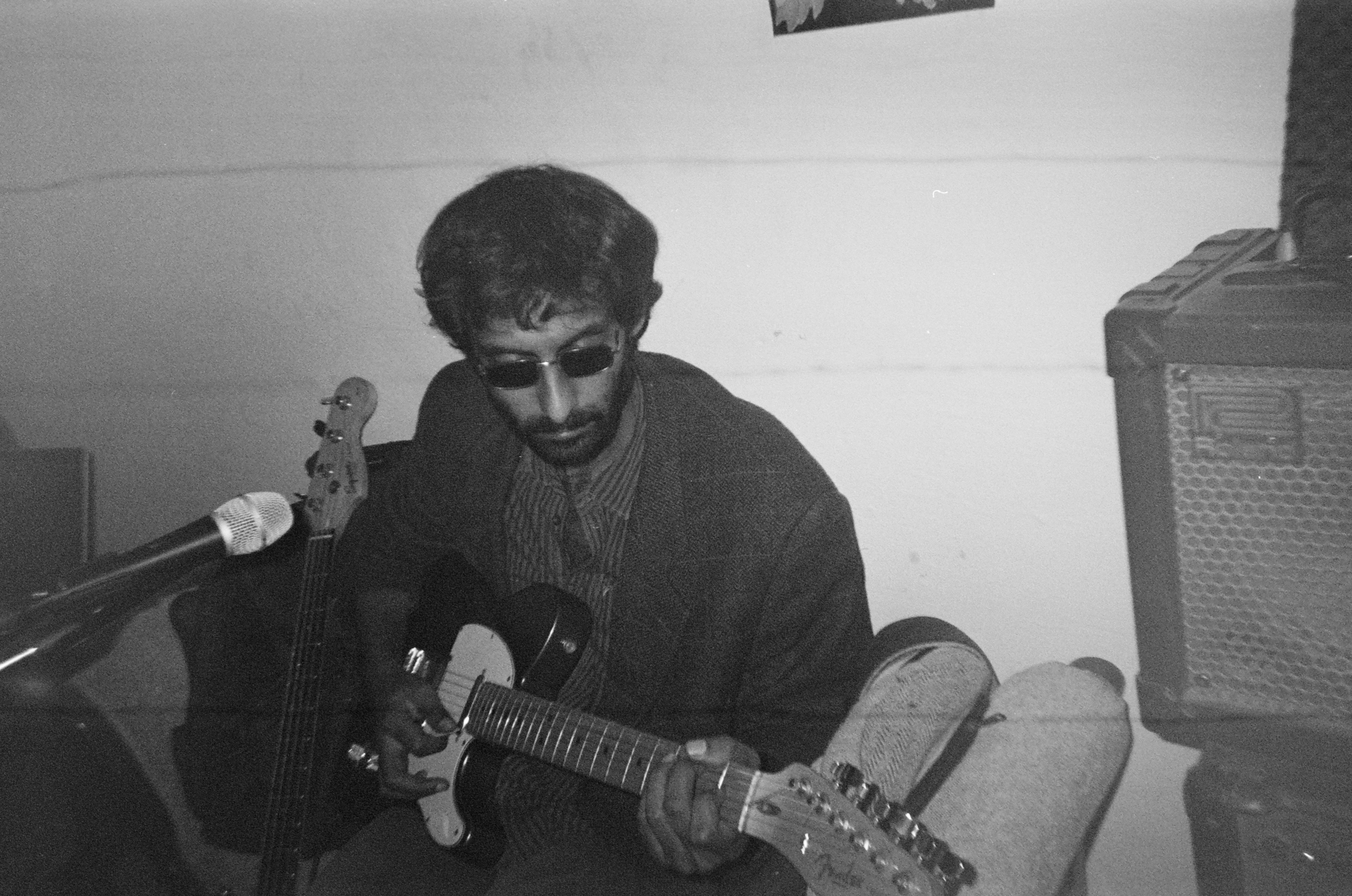
Suryakant Sawhney

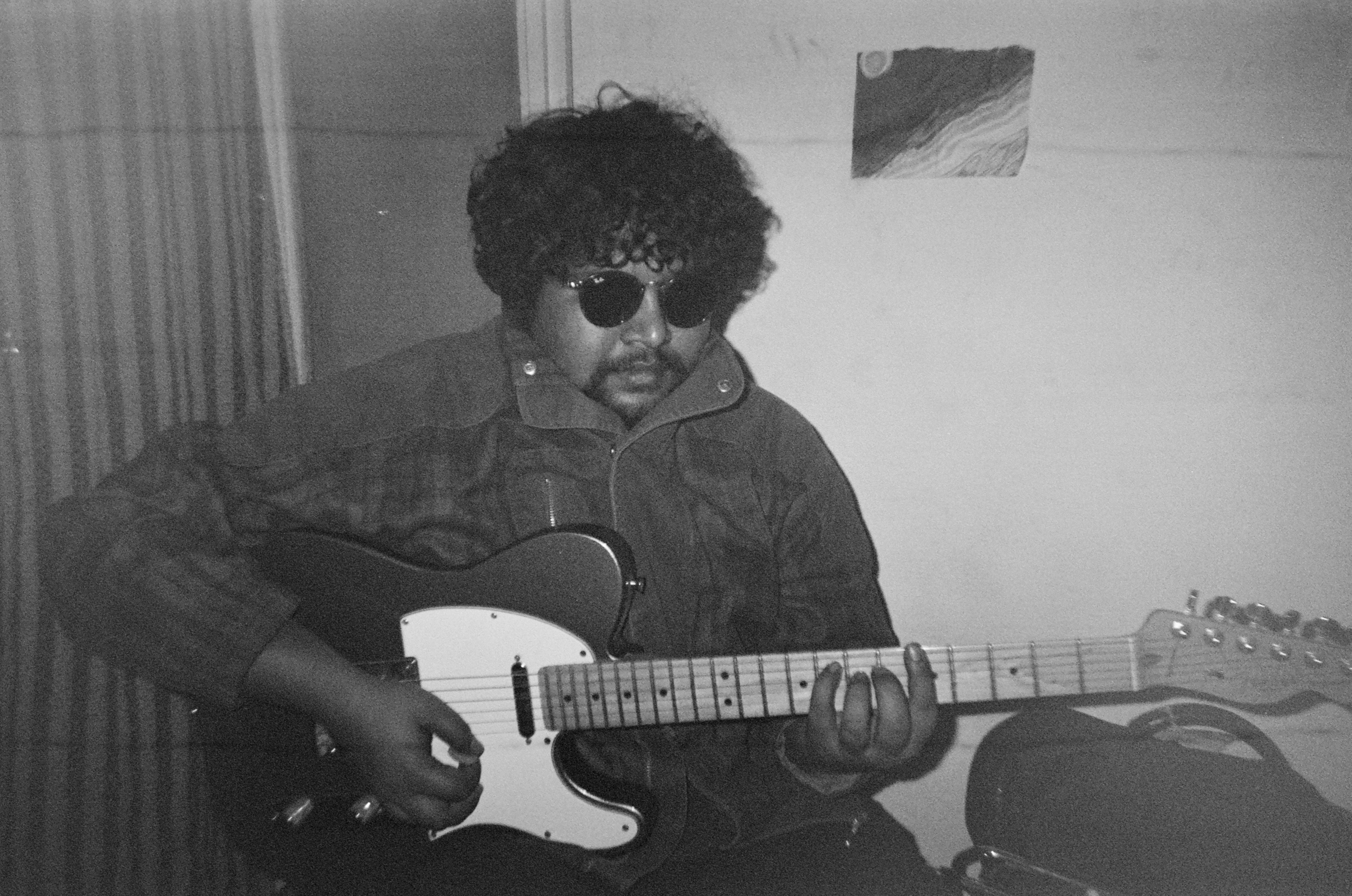
Kartik Pillai

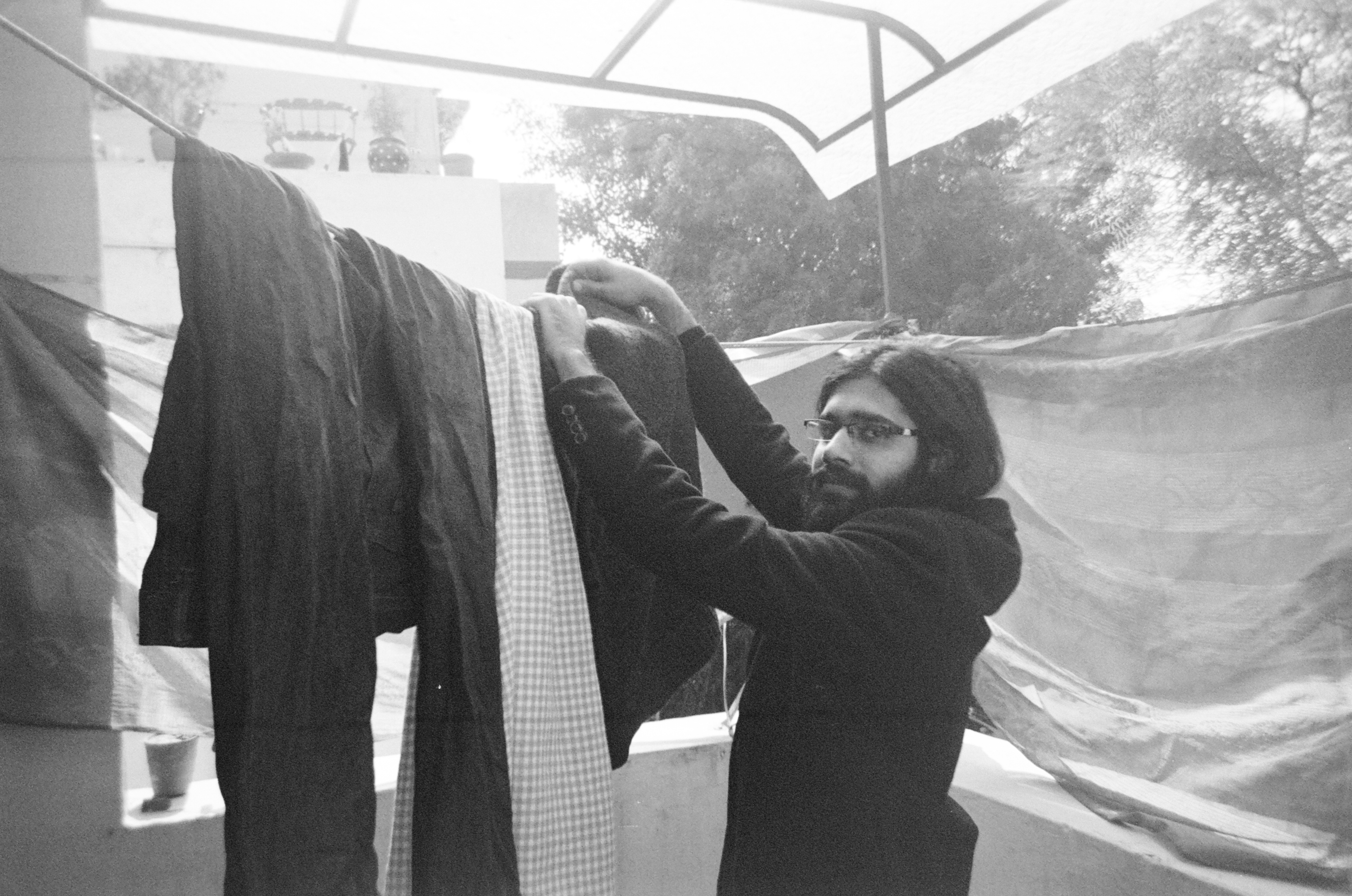
Dhruv Bhola

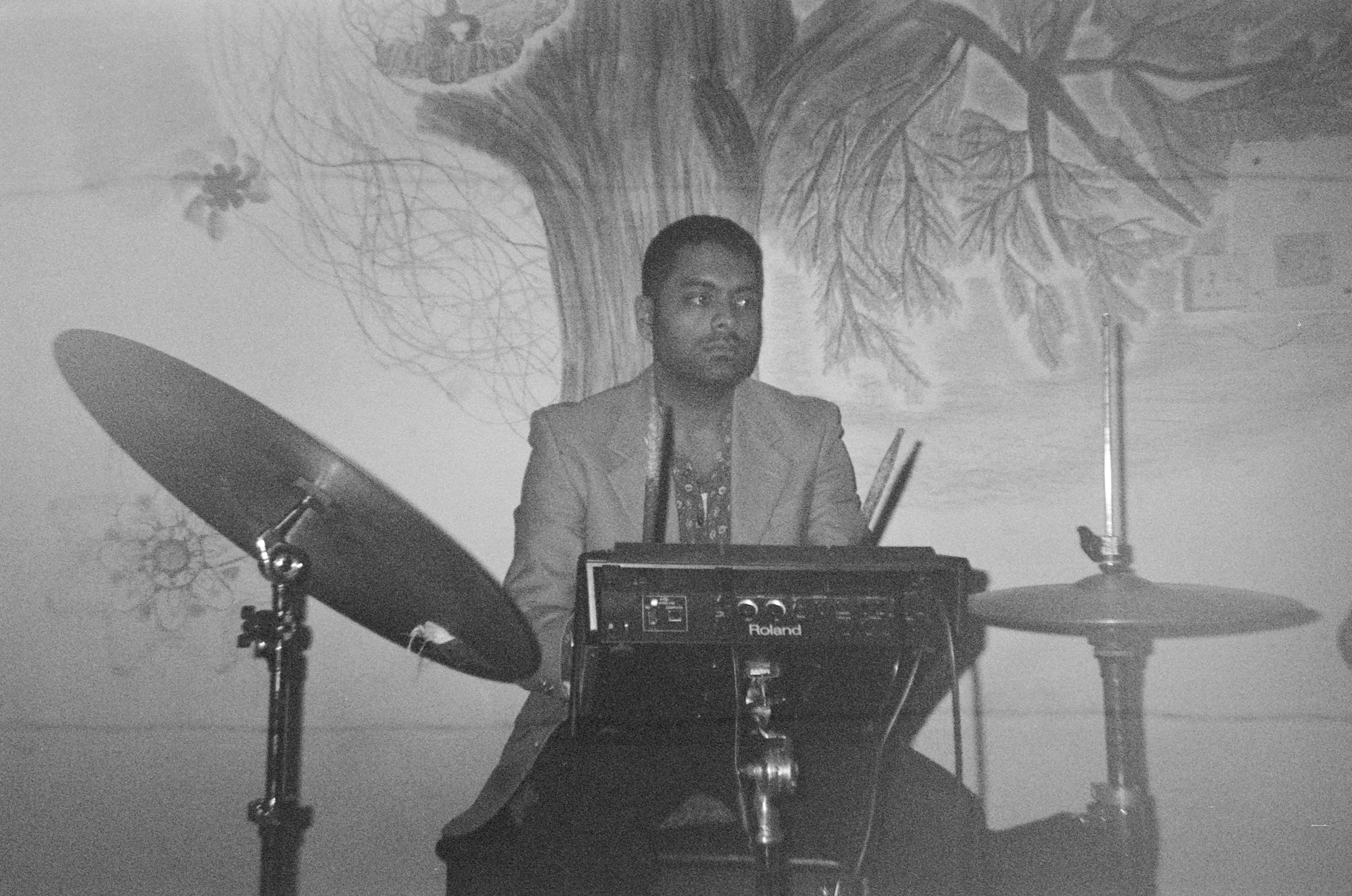
Karan Singh

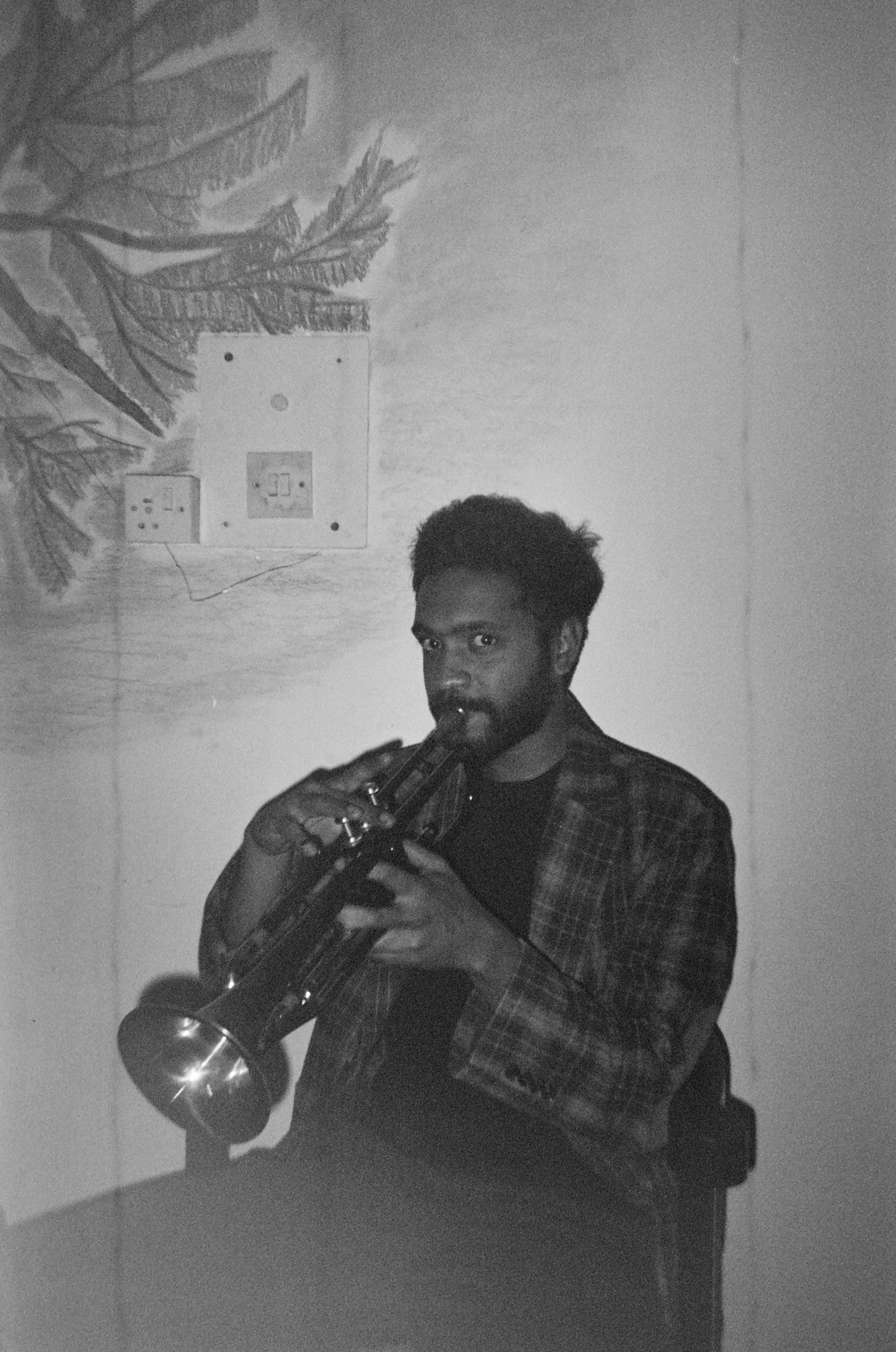
Rohit Gupta

== Accolades ==
- Peter Cat Recording Co. was nominated for Best Band and Best Song (‘Clown on the 22nd Floor’) at the 2011 Jack Daniel's Rock Awards.
