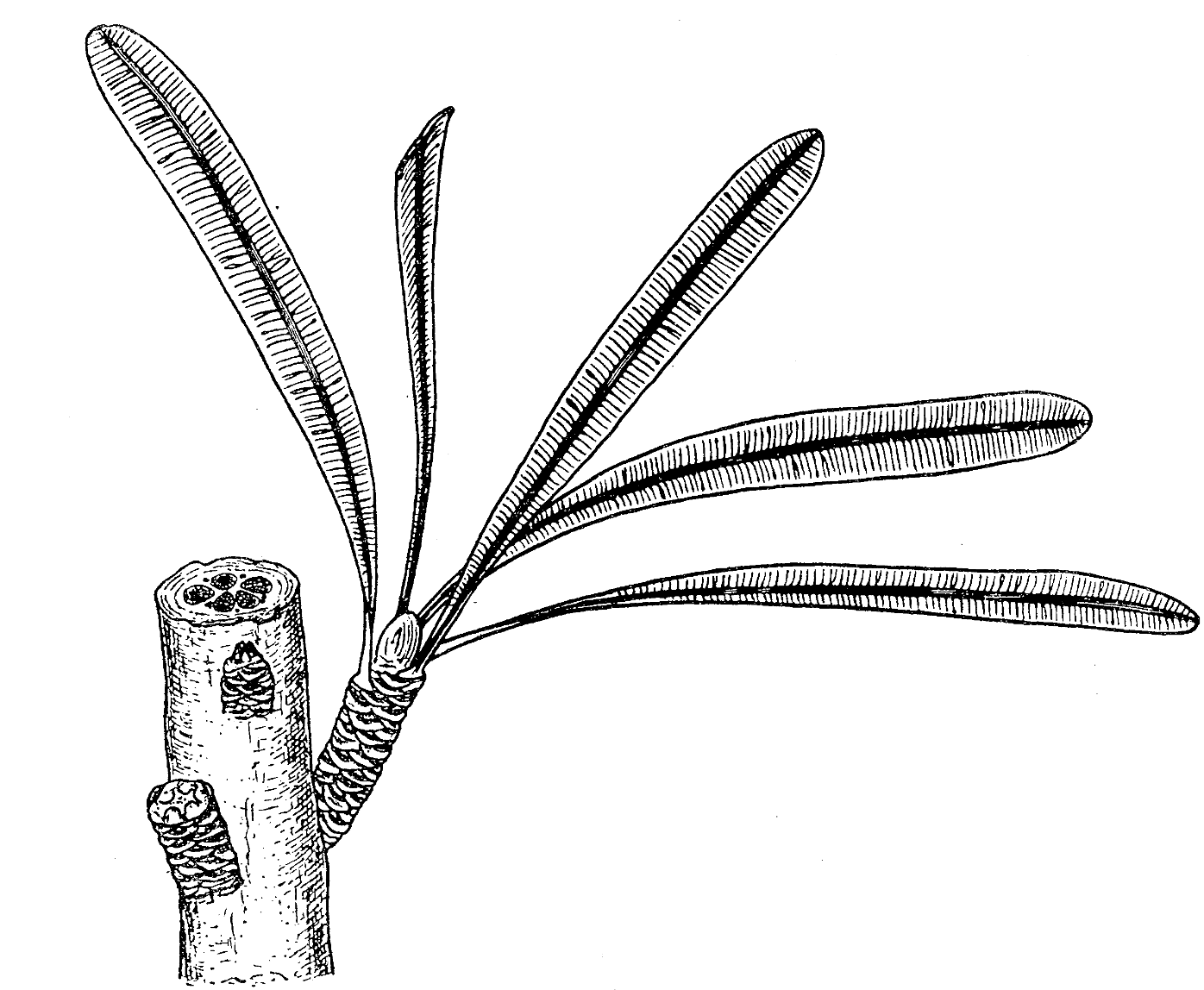
- Reconstruction of Pentoxylon Sahnii as envisaged by Birbal Sahni in the protologue of the order.

Scientific classification
- Kingdom: Plantae
- Clade: Embryophytes
- Clade: Tracheophytes
- Clade: Spermatophytes
- Order: †Pentoxylales; Pilger and Melchior, 1954

Genera
- Pentoxylon (stem); Donponoxylon? (stem); Nipaniophyllum (leaves); Sahnia (pollen organ); Carnoconites (seed bearing organ)

Synonyms
- Pentoxyleae Sahni, 1948

= Pentoxylales =

Pentoxylales Temporal range: Jurassic–Early Cretaceous

Extinct order of seed-bearing plants

Pentoxylales is an extinct order of seed plants known from the Jurassic and Early Cretaceous of East Gondwana.

== Discovery ==
The first specimens belonging to Pentoxylales were reported by Birbal Sahni in 1948 from Jurassic-Cretaceous strata of the Rajmahal Hills of northeastern India. Remains have subsequently been reported from New Zealand, Australia and Antarctica. The oldest records of the group date to the Upper Jurassic, though there are unconfirmed Early Jurassic records.

== Morphology ==
=== Stem ===
The stem of Pentoxylales, referred to by the morphogenus Pentoxylon, consists of 5 or 6 wedge shaped segments embedded within thin walled ground tissue.

=== Leaves ===
Leaves of Pentoxylales are of the strap shaped Taenopteris morphotype shared with other groups of seed plants, while leaves that preserve the cuticle are referred to the morphogenus Nipaniophyllum. The leaves are up to 20 centimetres long, and have a prominent midrib.

=== Pollen organs ===
The pollen organs of Pentoxylales, referred to the morphogenus Sahnia, consist of microsporophylls arranged in tight spirals around or on a cylindrical or dome-shaped receptacle. The base of the pollen organs are surrounded by bracts up to 6 mm long. The pollen is monosulcate and approximately 25 μm long.

=== Seed bearing organs ===
Seed bearing organs of Pentoxylales, dubbed Carnoconites, which have a central axis or peduncle, which branches into numerous structures that end with an ovule. The morphology has variously been described as infructescences, seed cones, seed-bearing fruits, or female flowers. The seeds are apparently sessile.

=== Whole plant reconstruction ===
The habit of Pentoxylales is uncertain. They have been suggested to have been small trees. Their liana-like anatomy has also led to suggestions of a habit similar to that of brambles.

== Phylogenetics ==
The affinities of Pentoxylales remain obscure, phylogenetic analyses have proposed various affinities with other seed plants groups, including glossopterids and Bennettitales, but evidence for this is inconclusive, and they cannot be definitively linked with any other seed plant group.
