= Birbal Sahni Institute of Palaeosciences =

Palaeobotany institute in India

DST- Birbal Sahni Institute of Palaeosciences
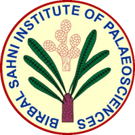
- Other name: DST-BSIP
- Former names: Institute of Palaeobotany, Birbal Sahni Institute of Palaeobotany
- Type: An autonomous institute constituted under the Department of Science and Technology
- Established: 10 September 1946; 79 years ago
- Founders: Birbal Sahni, FRS
- Parent institution: Department of Science and Technology
- Affiliations: Department of Science and Technology
- Academic affiliations: Academy of Scientific and Innovative Research (AcSIR)
- Budget: 126 Crore (2022-23)
- Director: Prof. Mahesh G. Thakkar
- Academic staff: 48
- Administrative staff: 100
- Total staff: 176
- Doctoral students: 70
- Location: 53, University Road, Lucknow, Uttar Pradesh, 226007, India; 26°52′03″N 80°56′20″E
- Campus: Urban
- Language: Hindi, English
- Website: BSIP
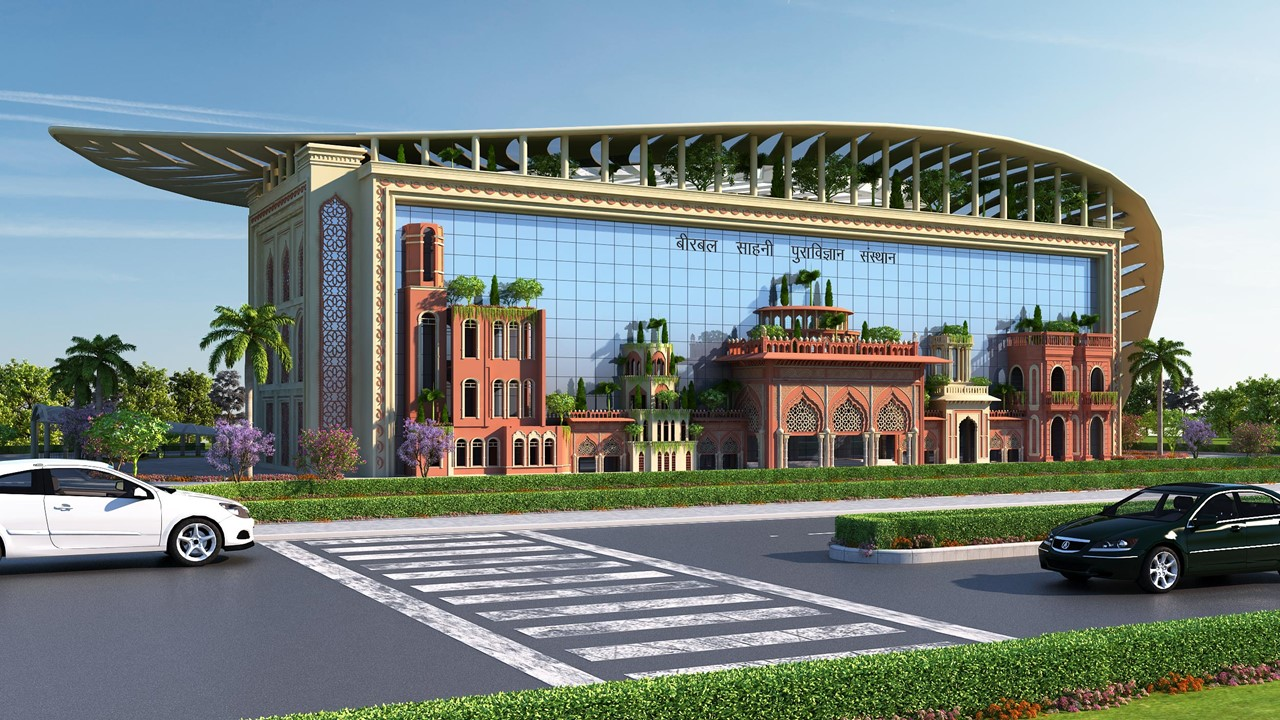
- BSIP’s new Rs100 cr leaf-structured building

The Birbal Sahni Institute of Palaeosciences (BSIP), formerly known as the Birbal Sahni Institute of Palaeobotany, is an autonomous institution established by the Government of India under the Department of Science and Technology. The Birbal Sahni Institute of Palaeosciences is situated in Lucknow, Uttar Pradesh, India. Its primary aim is to integrate the disciplines of plant and earth sciences to carry out palaeobotanical research. The area of Fusion-Science is given actual relevance by the use of modern equipment, computing technology, and well-equipped laboratories staffed by skilled specialists. This enables research on a broad variety of general themes, both practical and fundamental. The targeted goals are being achieved via collaboration at both national and international levels, as well as involvement in numerous research programs.

== History ==
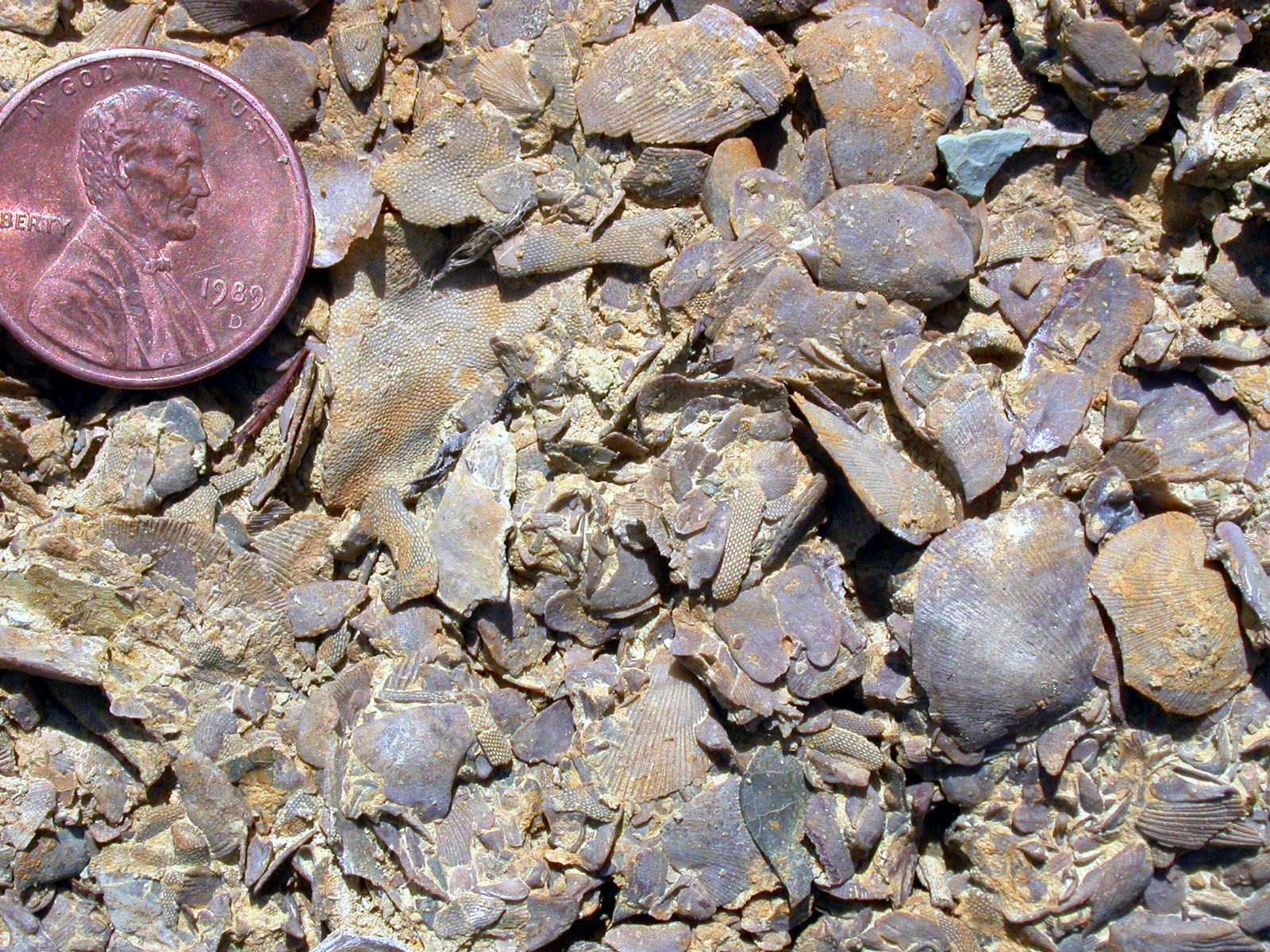
Brachiopods and bryozoans in an Ordovician limestone, southern Minnesota

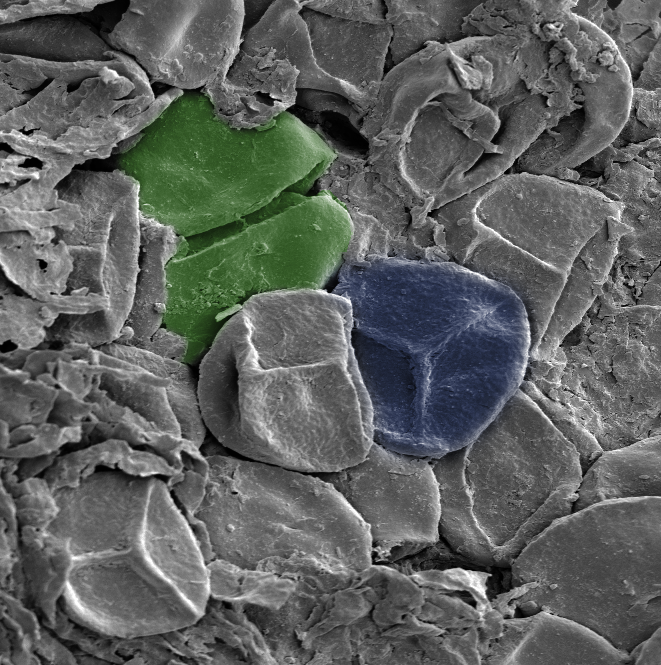
A late Silurian sporangium bearing trilete spores. Such spores are the earliest evidence of life on land.

The Birbal Sahni Institute of Palaeosciences is named after its esteemed founder, Professor Birbal Sahni, a distinguished figure in contemporary India. In September 1939, a group of palaeobotanists in India established a committee, led by Professor Sahni, to oversee and publish regular reports on palaeobotanical research. The first publication named 'Palaeobotany in India' was released in 1940, while the last one was published in 1953. On 19 May 1946, a group of eight individuals, namely K.N. Kaul, R.N. Lakhanpal, B. Sahni, S.D. Saxena, R.V. Sitholey, K.R. Surange, B.S. Trivedi, and S. Venkatachary, who were all working in Lucknow at the time, officially established a Palaeobotanical Society by signing a Memorandum of Association. A trust, named on 3 June, was established under the Societies Registration Act (XXI of 1860). It was formed with initial private funds and immovable property, as well as a reference library and fossil collections donated by Professor Birbal Sahni and Mrs. Savitri Sahni. The trust's main objective is to support and encourage original research in the field of Palaeobotany.

This trust was entrusted with the responsibility of establishing a Research Institute. The Society's Governing Body founded the 'Institute of Palaeobotany' and named Professor Sahni as its first Director on 10 September 1946, by a decision. The Institute conducted its work at the Department of Botany at Lucknow University, Lucknow, until a permanent location was acquired. In September 1948, the Institute relocated to its current site, which was generously donated by the Government of the erstwhile United Provinces. The campus consists of a spacious bungalow situated on 3.50 acres of ground. Plans were promptly devised to construct a structure for the Institute. The inauguration of the new structure took place on 3 April 1949, with the laying of the Foundation Stone by Prime Minister Pandit Jawaharlal Nehru. Regrettably, on 10 April 1949, Professor Sahni expired, therefore leaving the task of establishing the Institute to his wife, Mrs. Savitri Sahni. The unwavering dedication and enthusiasm of Mrs. Savitri Sahni resulted in the successful construction of the new structure at the conclusion of 1952. On 2 January 1953, Prime Minister Pandit Jawaharlal Nehru inaugurated the building, specifically for scientific purposes, in the presence of several scientists from India and other countries. Prof. T.M. Harris from the University of Reading, England, acted as an Advisor to the Institute during the period of December 1949 to January 1950. In May 1950, Dr. R.V. Sitholey, who was the Assistant Director at the time, was assigned the role of Officer-in-charge to carry out the ongoing responsibilities of the Director. This was done under the supervision of Mrs. Savitri Sahni, who was the President.

In 1951, the Birbal Sahni Institute of Palaeosciences was added to UNESCO's Technical Assistance Programme. Professor O.A. Høeg from the University of Oslo, Norway, served as its Director from October 1951 to early August 1953. Shortly after Prof. Høeg left, Dr. K.R. Surange was appointed as the Officer-in-charge, with the President of the Governing Body of the Palaeobotanical Society overseeing their work. In October 1959, Mrs. Savitri Sahni assumed the dual role of President of the Society and President of the Institute, overseeing administrative matters. Concurrently, Dr. Surange was named as Director, responsible for academic and research operations. By the end of 1967, it was recognized that the Palaeobotanical Society should operate only as a scientific entity, while the Institute should act as an independent institution. Prof. K.N. Kaul became the presidency of the Society in January 1968. During this period, a new constitution was created, resulting in the registration of the Birbal Sahni Institute of Palaeosciences as an independent organization on 9 July 1969. In November 1969, the Palaeobotanical Society transferred the property of the Institute to a new entity, resulting in the Birbal Sahni Institute of Palaeobotany being under the control of a new Governing entity. Since that time, the Institute operates as an independent research institution and receives funding from the Department of Science and Technology, Government of India.

== Museum ==
The collection of fossil plants made by Professor Sahni from India and abroad, including those received by him as gift or in exchange, structured the beginning of Institute's museum. The repository of the museum has continuously been enriched through collections made by scientists of the Institute during their fieldwork all over the country, and also by the receipt in exchange of material from foreign countries. The Holotype specimens, slides and figured specimens are systematically stored by the museum that is readily available for the investigation to the research workers.

The fossil specimens are also freely gifted to the university and college departments of botany and geology, for teaching and demonstration purposes. The present position of Type and figured specimens is as under. Type and figured specimens 6679 Type and figured Slides 12740 Negatives 17504 The museum is housed in spacious halls in which the exhibits are arranged and displayed in order to illustrate various aspects of palaeobotany, from a generalized and geological point of view. In the museum, the Foundation Stone of the Institute, cast by Professor Birbal Sahni himself, is unique. It comprises fossils of different geological ages and collected from several countries, embedded in a marble grit-cement block. A 'Geological Time Clock' is another and one of the special attractions of the museum, in which the geological time is contracted within 24 hours. The clock communicates the evolution of life on earth as the day progresses from mid-night, and depicts the gradual events of evolution up to the advent of man, within the stipulated time-scale of 24 hours.

== Knowledge Resource Centre ==
The Library subscribes a wide variety of journals and is also a member of CSIR-DST consortia NKRC (National Knowledge Resource Consortium). The online access of many e-journals from Elsevier, Springer, Wiley, Taylor & Francis, Oxford University Press and databases like Scopus, Web of Sciences is available to users over the institute LAN. The access of software viz. iThenticate and Grammarly provides facility for plagiarism check.

=== Collection Snapshot of BSIP Library ===
Resource Type	Size
Books (in English)	6419
Journals (Bound Volumes)	18032
Reprints	40179
Reference Books	356
Books (in Hindi)	902
PhD Thesis	148
Reports	46
Maps & Atlas	61
Microfilm/Fisches	294
Compact Disk	74

== Computer Section ==
In view of the advancements in the information technology in aid to scientific researches, the Institute advantageously established an Electronic Data Processing (EDP) unit over one and half decade ago. It is equipped with the state-of-art computing facilities, which is constantly upgraded. It renders services to the scientists, technical and administrative staff in their working. Initially the unit had 64KBPS leased line internet connection in the Institute, commissioned with the domain name "bsip.res.in". Local area Network (LAN) provides Internet access in the Institute with 150 nodes. Presently Proxy, Mail, DNS and Backup Servers have been successfully upgraded with new hardware.

Internet Connection with Radio link facility from Software Technology Park of India, Lucknow and NKN (National Knowledge Network) link provided by NIC through OFC are running up to 8 Mbit/s in the Institute. Proxy, Mail and DNS Servers are successfully configured on Redhat Linux ES 3.0 Operating System and Sun Solaris. This provides 24 hours Internet facility to the Institute Staff. At present 150 Computers are connected with the LAN. E-Mail accounts for Scientists, Units/Sections have been opened through Mail Server on Institute Domain Name (BSIP.RES.IN).

An Anti Virus Program Symentic End Point Ver 11.0 has been renewed with 150 user license to protect the system from viruses and worms.

Payroll, Form16 and Pension packages are also modified as per the requirements and also the Annual Accounts, Budget and Revised Estimates are prepared. Section is providing help to the scientists in preparing the Multimedia presentations, Charts, Graphs, Lithologs and other diagrams for their scientific publications and documentation.

== Objectives ==
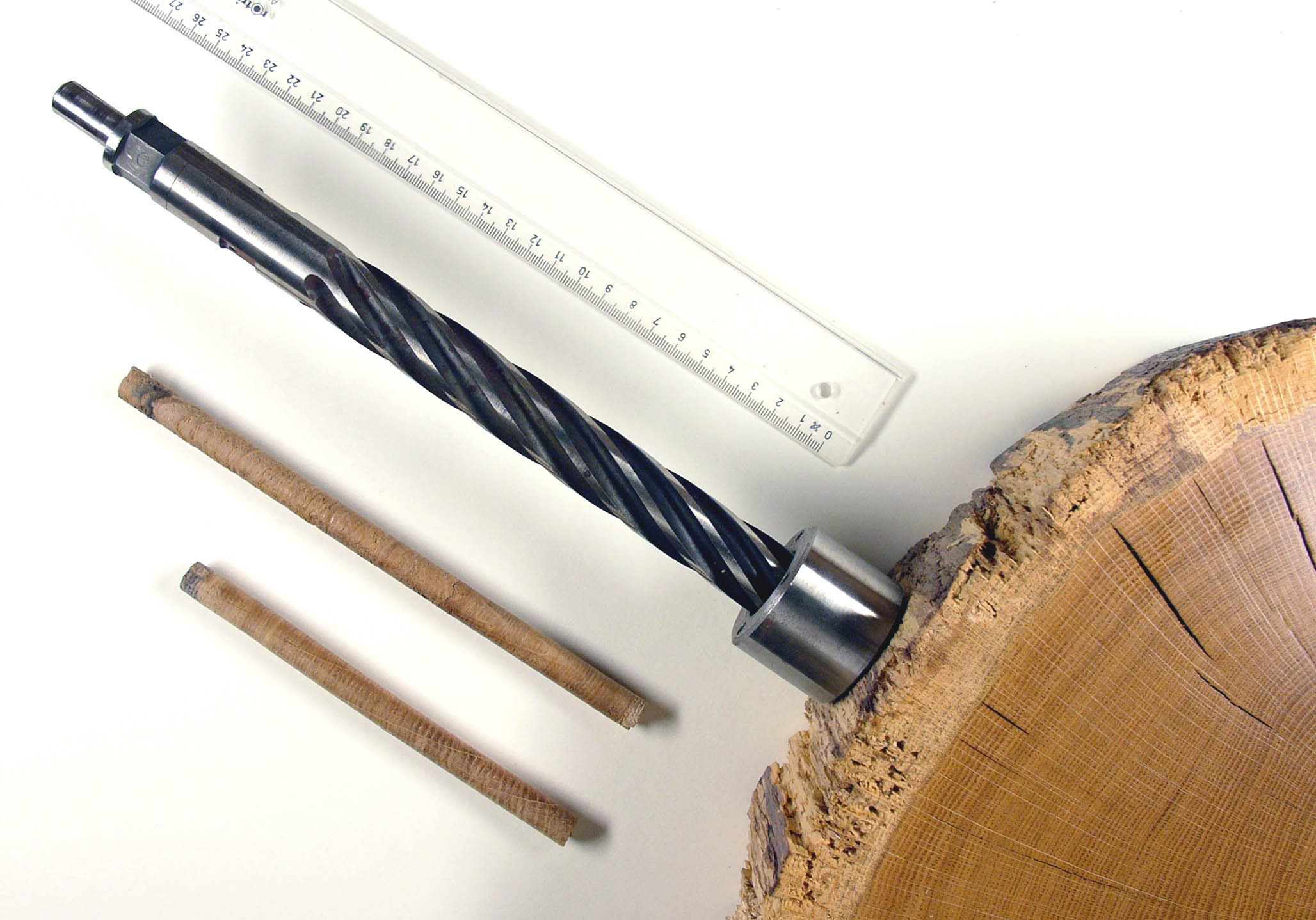
Drill for dendrochronology sampling and growth ring counting

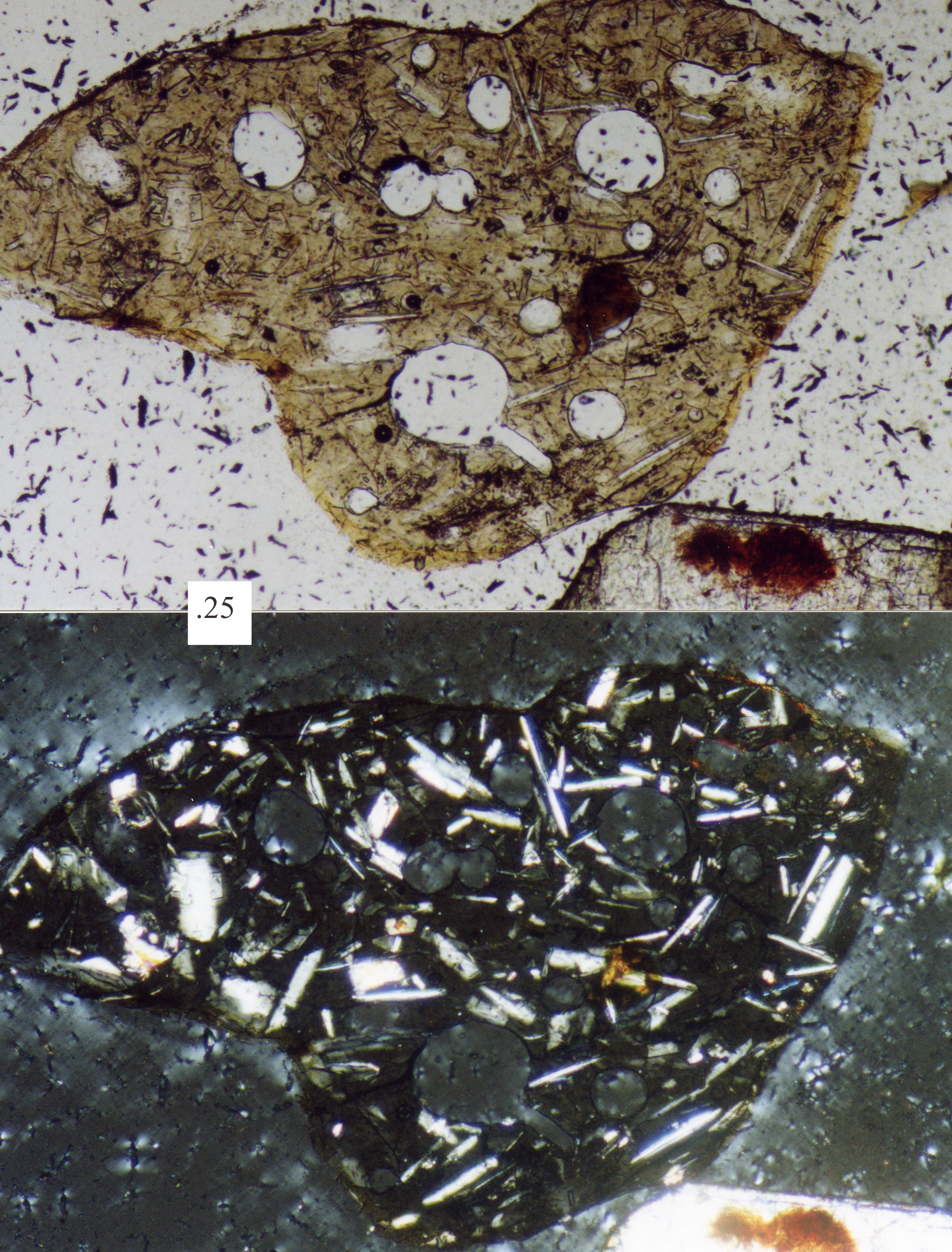
A volcanic sand grain seen under the microscope, with plane-polarized light in the upper picture, and cross polarized light in the lower picture. Scale box is 0.25 mm.

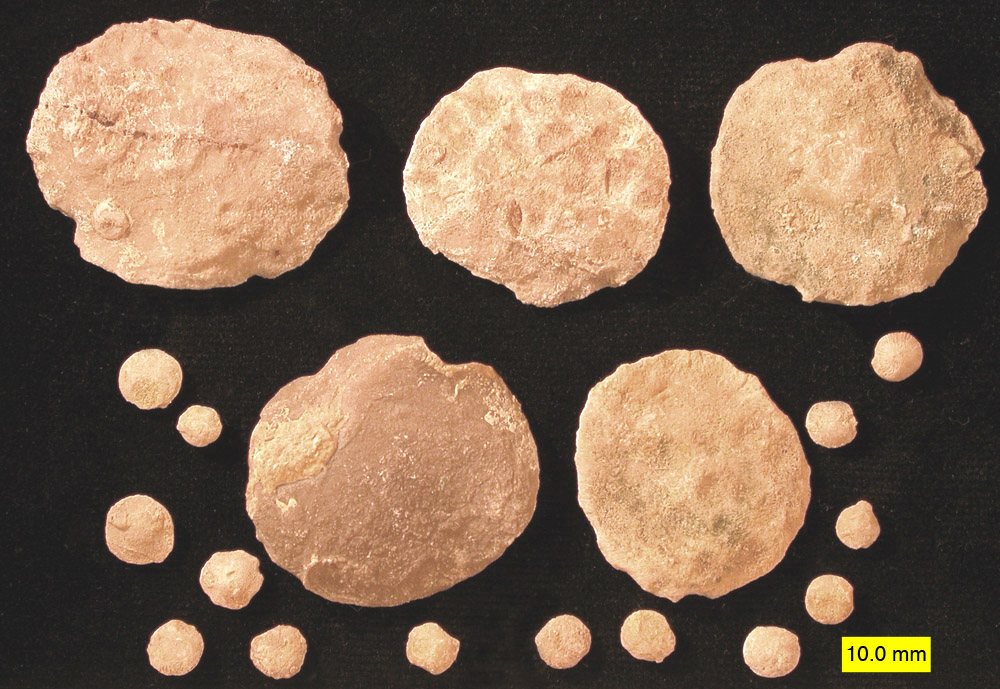
Fossil nummulitid foraminiferans showing microspheric and megalospheric individuals; Eocene of the United Arab Emirates; scale in mm.

The main objectives of the institute are set as:

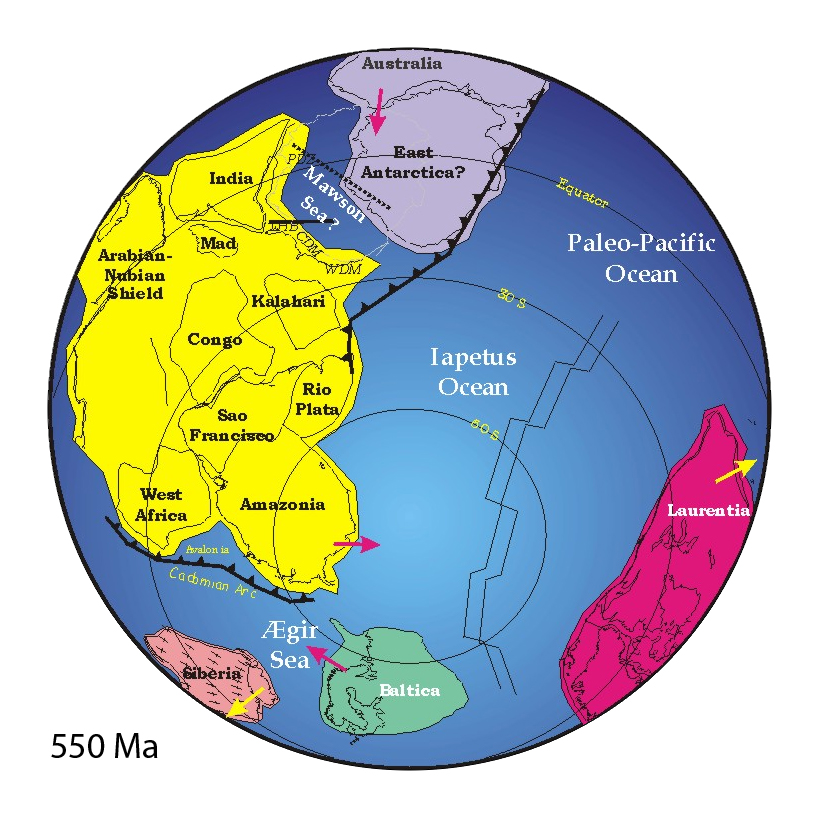
- Reconstruction showing final stages of assembly of Gondwana, 550 Mya
  To develop palaeobotany in all its botanical and geological aspects.
- To constantly update data for interaction with allied disciplines.
- To co-ordinate with other palaeobotanical and geological research centres in the areas of mutual interest, such as diversification of early life, exploration of fossil fuels, vegetational dynamics, climatic modelling, conservation of forests.
- To disseminate palaeobotanical knowledge in universities, educational institutions and other organisations.

== Thrust areas ==
The institute has identified the thrust areas of activities on:

- Pre-Cambrian Palaeobiology
- Gondwana Mesozoic Palaeofloristics
- Gondwana Palynology
- Cenozoic Palaeofloristics
- Late Mesozoic-Cenozoic Palynology
- Marine Micropaleontology
- Organic Petrology
- Quaternary Paleoclimate
- Dendrochronology
- Paleoethnobotany
- Isotope and Geochemistry
- Arctic-Antarctic Research

== Departments ==
=== Museum ===
BSIP nurses a museum, originally housing the fossil collections of Professor Sahni, but now holds later collections made by the scientists over the years. The collection includes holotype specimens, slides and figured specimens.

- Figured specimens : 6679
- Figured slides : 12740
- Slide negatives : 17504

The museum, with its foundation stone, laid by Birbal Sahni, composed of fossils of various geological ages embedded in a marble-cement block, displays the specimens based on their general and geological relevance. The museum also maintains a Geological Time Clock.

=== Knowledge Resource Centre ===
The Institute library is an automated one with database services such as GEOREF, Web of Science, JCCC@INSTIRC and access to CSIR-DST consortium. It operates on a fully integrated multi-user LIBSYS 4 software package with addition of Web OPAC. The journals are made available online to the users.

=== Herbarium ===
The Herbarium functions with four different sections:

- General collection of dried plants mounted on herbarium sheets
- Xylarium - collection of woods and their thin sections
- Sporothek - collection of pollen and spore slides and polleniferous material
- Carpothek - collection of fruits, seeds

The fossil specimens such as leaves, cuticle, pollen, spores, fruits, seed and wood, numbering 51,472, are preserved according to their variation, local names, uses, distribution and ecology and include contributions from J. F. Duthie, R. R. Stewart, K. N. Kaul, Birbal Sahni, O. A. Hoeg and A. L. Takhtajan.

=== Computer Centre ===
BSIP is well equipped with an advanced computer network with LAN, radio link facility from the Software Park of India, Lucknow and National Knowledge Network connection. The web site of the institute is also maintained by the Computer Centre.

=== Journal of Palaeosciences ===
Journal of Palaeosciences formally known as The Palaeobotanist is a widely acknowledged journal in the field of Palaeosciences and Palaeobotany, published by the institute. BSIP published the first volume in 1952 as an annual publication. However, the frequency has been increased over the time and, since 1962, is released three times a year. The journal is now an online journal.

== See also ==
- Manipur Ice Age bamboo fossil
