= Sahnioxylon =

Sahnioxylon Temporal range: Middle Triassic-Late Cretaceous 247–66 Ma

Scientific classification
- Kingdom: Plantae
- Clade: Embryophytes
- Clade: Tracheophytes
- Clade: Spermatophytes
- Clade: Gymnospermae
- Division: Cycadophyta
- Genus: †Sahnioxylon; Sahni 1932

Species
- "S. andrewsii" †; "S. antarcticum" †; "S. rajmahalense" †

Species of prehistoric plant

Sahnioxylon is an extinct prehistoric genus of fossil woods.

== Description ==
Sahnioxylon is a wood compact, identifiable by its distinctly marked growth-rings, and made up of tracheids and rays. The medullary rays are numerous and crowded, being 1-4 cells in width and 1-56 cells in height. In latewood, the pitting on the radial walls is either multiseriate or biseriate, or contiguous or separate, whereas in earlywood, it is either scalariform or multiseriate. Overall, there are 1-12 pits, and the pores are elliptical.

== History ==
The form-genus Sahnioxylon was first coined by paleobotanist Birbal Sahni, and is used for fossilized woods, whose primitive features place them in between Cycadeoidea, Gnetales, and homoxylous angiosperms. These plants have been found in Siberia, India, Antarctica, Romania, Middle-Asia, and New-Caledonia. A review proposed to keep the species below within Sahnioxylon.

1. S. andrewsii Bose & Sah, 1954: (Rajmahal Hills, India, Late Jurassic or Early Cretaceous);
2. S. antarcticum Lemoigne & Torres, 1988: (South Shetland, Antarctica, Late Cretaceous);
3. S. rajmahalense Sahni, 1931; Bose & Sah, 1954: (Rajmahal Hills, India, Late Jurassic or Early Cretaceous);
4. S. sp. Kumarasamy & Jeyasingh, 1995: (Madras area, India, Early Cretaceous, maybe conspecific with Mesembrioxylon sp. Sahni, 1931);
5. S. sp Torres, 1995: (South Shetland, Antarctica, Early Cretaceous);
6. S. sp Torres, 1995: (South Shetland, Antarctica, Early Cretaceous);

== Distribution ==
The article by Torres and Phillipe stated that “the distribution of Sahnioxylon, is astonishing and does not comply with Mesozoic vegetation maps as proposed, for example, by Vakhrameev [1991].” There are three main hypotheses as to how the gymnosperm has been found in deposits from all over the world.

1. The first bias is that data is lacking. The range of the plant could be larger but is unidentified. It may, in places, not be preserved, found, or published. In rebuttal to the hypothesis, is that sediments similar to the ones found in Sahnioxylon localities are all over the world.
2. The next bias is that samples that actually belong to Sahnioxylon, have not been described as such.
3. The final possibility is that of parallel evolution.

== Sources ==
1. First record of Sahnioxylon Bose & Sah from South America (Upper Jurassic – Lower Cretaceous of Argentine Patagonia) - Greppi - 2026 - Papers in Palaeontology - Wiley Online Library
2. Growth ring features in Sahnioxylon from Rajmahal Hills and their climatic implications on JSTOR
3. https://www.researchgate.net/publication/280140532_Sahnioxylon_a_Mesozoic_wood_with_a_loose_distribution_China_India_and_western_Antarctica
4. On Sahnioxylon Rajmahalense, A New Name For Homoxylon Rajmahalense Sahni, And S. Andrewsii, A New Species of Sahnioxylon From Amrapara In The Rajmahal Hills, Bihar - M. N. Bose, S. C. D. Sah, 1954
5. The Jurassic fossil wood diversity from western Liaoning, NE China | Journal of Palaeogeography | Springer Nature Link
6. Mesozoic woods from India: Nomenclature review and palaeoclimatic implications - ScienceDirect
7. Impresión de fax de página completa
