= Lifafa =

Indian Musician

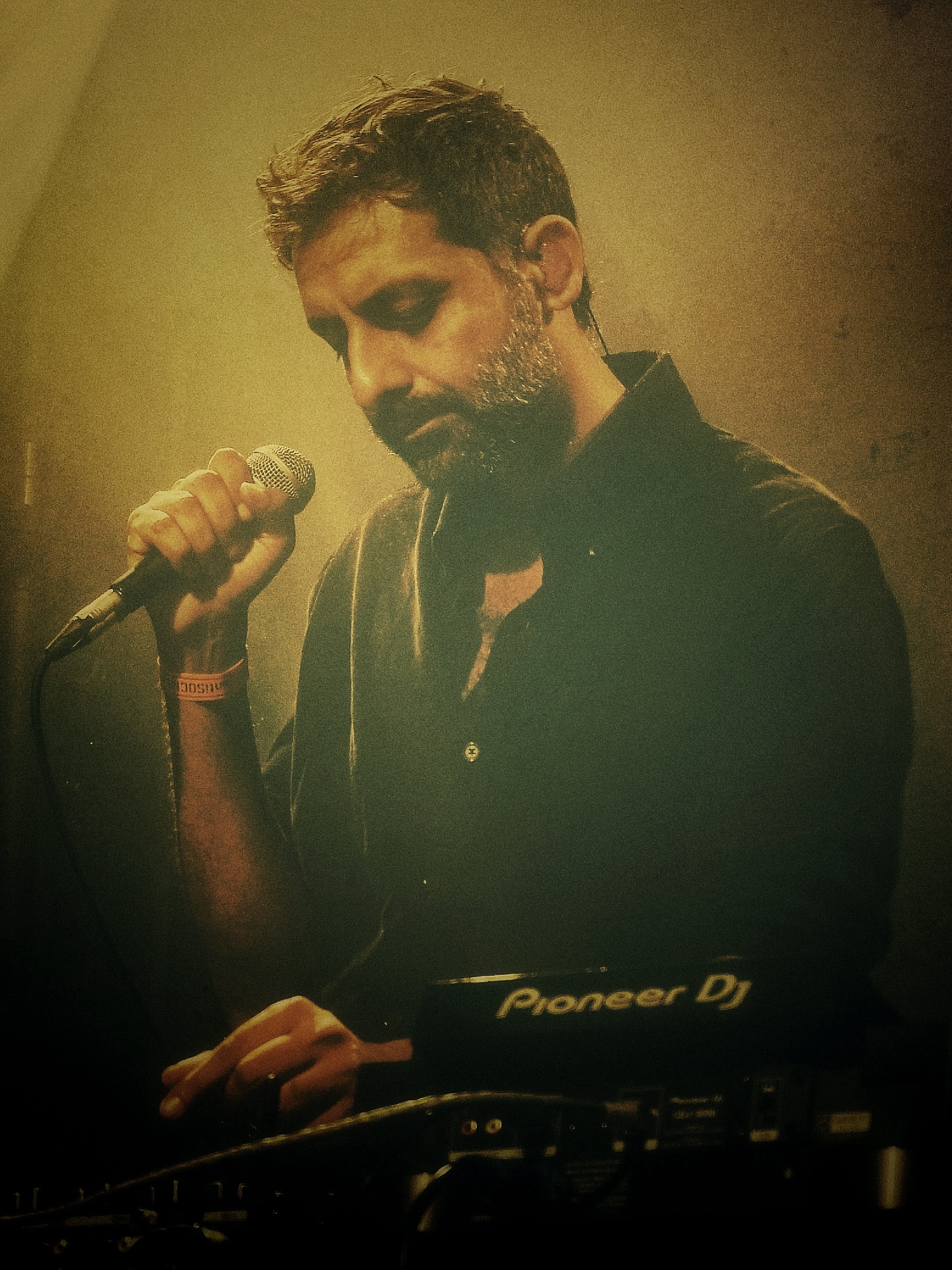
- Lifafa performing at antisocial, 2024

Background information
- Born: March 1, 1987 (age 39)
- Genres: Electronica; Bollywood; Alt rock; Pop; Urban; Glitch; Jazz; R&B
- Label: Pagal Haina
- Member of: Peter Cat Recording Co.
- Spouse: Surabhi Tandon
- Website: www.lifafa.xxx

Suryakant Samson Sawhney, known professionally as Lifafa, is an Indian indie musician, who is also popular for being a founding member of Peter Cat Recording Co.. Lifafa came to prominence with his sophomore album Jaago. The title track of the album has since become a popular song, mostly used as a protest anthem, and so did the song "Wahin Ka Wahin" from his sophomore album, SUPERPOWER2020, which mainly focused on social commentary. However, the outro track "Mandir", featuring Hashback Hashish, from SUPERPOWER2020, was removed due to the sexual assault allegations against Hashish that surfaced in 2020. Lifafa was also one of the many artists to perform at Shaheen Bagh as part of "Artists Against Communalism" during the Shaheen Bagh protests.

== Discography ==
- Lifafa (2013)
- In Hi Ko (2014)
- Jaago (2019)
- SUPERPOWER2020 (2020)
- Ghar: Sounds of Raw Mango (2020)
