= Birbal Sahni =

Indian palaeobotanist (1891–1949)

Birbal Sahni, FRS
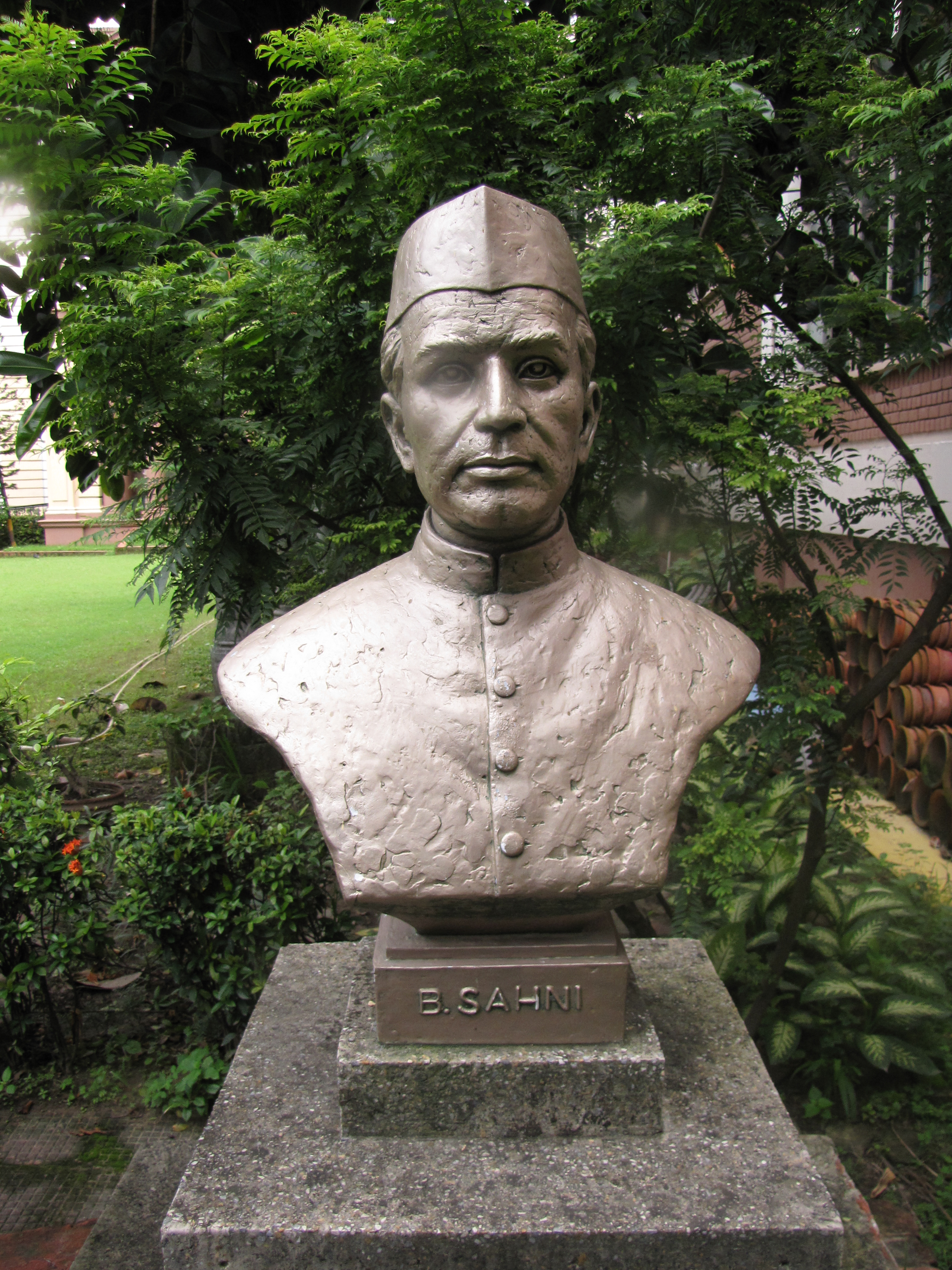
- Bust of Birbal Sahni, 2014
- Born: 14 November 1891; Bhera, Shahpur District, Punjab, British India - Presently in Pakistan
- Died: 10 April 1949 (aged 57); Lucknow, Uttar Pradesh, India
- Citizenship: India
- Education: Government College University, Lahore, Emmanuel College, Cambridge
- Known for: Bennettitales, Pentoxylales, Sahnioxylon rajmahalense
- Spouse: Savitri Suri
- Scientific career
- Fields: Paleobotany
- Workplaces: Birbal Sahni Institute of Palaeosciences, University of Lucknow
- Doctoral advisor: Albert Seward
- Other academic advisors: Goebel
- Doctoral students: Rajendra Nath Lakhanpal

Birbal Sahni FRS (14 November 1891 – 10 April 1949) was an Indian paleobotanist who studied the fossils of the Indian subcontinent. He also took an interest in geology and archaeology. He founded what is now the Birbal Sahni Institute of Palaeobotany at Lucknow in 1946. His major contributions were in the study of the fossil plants of India and in plant evolution. He was also involved in the establishment of Indian science education and served as the president of the National Academy of Sciences, India and as an honorary president of the International Botanical Congress, Stockholm.

== Formative years ==
Birbal Sahni was born in Bhera, Shahpur, in today's Pakistani Punjab, on 14 November 1891. He was the third child of Ishwar Devi and the pioneer Indian meteorologist and scientist Ruchi Ram Sahni who lived in Lahore. The family came from Dera Ismail Khan and they frequently made visits to Bhera which was close to the Salt Range and Khewra's geology may have interested Birbal at a young age. Birbal was also influenced into science by his grandfather who owned a banking business at Dera Ismail Khan and conducted amateur research in chemistry. Ruchi Ram was a professor of chemistry at Lahore and was also a social activist with an interest in the emancipation of women. Ruchi Ram had studied at Manchester and worked with Ernest Rutherford and Niels Bohr. Every summer, Ruchi Ram would take his sons on long treks in the Himalayas, visiting Pathankot, Rohtang, Narkanda, Chini Pass, Amarnath, Machoi Glacier and Jozila Pass between 1907 and 1911. Ruchi Ram was involved in the non-co-operation movement since the Jallianwala Bagh massacre as well as the Brahmo Samaj movement. The proximity of their house to Bradlaugh Hall made their home a centre of political activity and house guests included Motilal Nehru, Gopal Krishna Gokhale, Sarojini Naidu, and Madan Mohan Malaviya. Birbal Sahni received his early education in India at the Mission and Central Model School Lahore, Government College University, Lahore (where his father worked, receiving a B.Sc. in 1911) and Punjab University. The family library included books in science, literary classics and he learnt botany under Shiv Ram Kashyap (1882-1934), the "father of Indian bryology" and travelled with Kashyap to Chamba, Leh, Baltal, Uri, Poonch and Gulmarg between 1920 and 1923. He followed his brothers to England and graduated from Emmanuel College, Cambridge in 1914. He later studied under Albert Seward, and was awarded the D.Sc. degree of the University of London in 1919.

== Career ==
During his stint in England, Sahni joined Professor Seward to work on a Revision of Indian Gondwana plants (1920, Palaeontologica Indica). In 1919 he briefly worked in Munich with the German plant morphologist Karl Ritter von Goebel.

In 1920 he married Savitri Suri, daughter of Sunder Das Suri an Inspector of Schools in Punjab. Savitri took an interest in his work and was a constant companion. Sahni returned to India and served as Professor of Botany at Banaras Hindu University, Varanasi and Punjab University for about a year. He was appointed the first professor and head of the Botany Department of the Lucknow University in 1921, a position he retained until his death. The University of Cambridge awarded him the degree of Sc. D. in 1929.

In 1932 Indica included his account of the Bennettitalean plant that he named Williamsonia sewardi, and another description of a new type of petrified wood, Homoxylon, bearing resemblance to the wood of a living homoxylous angiosperm, but from the Jurassic age. During the following years he not only continued his investigations but collected around him a group of devoted students from all parts of the country and built up a reputation for the university which soon became the first Center for botanical and palaeobotanical investigations in India. Sahni maintained close relations with researchers around the globe, being a friend of Chester A. Arnold, noted American paleobotanist who later served his year in residence from 1958–1959 at the institute. He was a founder of The Paleobotanical Society which established the Institute of Palaeobotany on 10 September 1946 which initially functioned in the Botany Department of Lucknow University but later moved to its present premises at 53 University Road, Lucknow in 1949. On 3 April 1949 the Prime Minister of India Jawaharlal Nehru laid the foundation stone of the new building of the institute. A week later, on 10 April 1949, Sahni succumbed to a heart attack.

== Contributions ==
Sahni work on living plants species including Nephrolepsis, Niphobolus, Taxus, Psilotum, Tmesipteris and Acmopyle examining evolutionary trends and geographical distributions. His ability to apply theory to observations and make hypotheses based on observations were especially influential on his students. When examining wood remains from Harappa, he noted that they were of conifers and inferred that the people there must have had trade links with people in mountains where conifers could grow. He recorded foreign pollen in the ovules of living Ginkgo biloba and noted in the New Phytologist (1915), the problem with assuming that fossil pollen in ovules belonged to a single species. Sahni was among the first to suggest a separate order, the Taxales, within the conifers to contain the genera Taxus, Torreya and Cephalotaxus. Another major contribution was in the studies on the morphology of the Zygopteridaceae. Sahni identified Torreyites, a close relative of Torreya, which extended the range of the Taxales into Gondwanaland. He also described Glossopteris in detail and identified differences between the flora of India and Australia with that of China and Sumatra. He also studied the fossil plants of the Deccan Intertrappean beds. He suggested that the lower Narmada area around Nagpur and Chhindwara was coastal on the basis of fossils that showed a similarity to estuarine palms of the genus Nipa. Based on the ecology of plants and the altitude of the fossil finds, he also attempted to estimate rates of uplift of the Himalayas.

Birbal Sahni's work influenced his younger brother Mulk Raj Sahni and his nephew Ashok Sahni to take up careers in palaeontology.

== Other interests ==
Sahni was interested in music and could play the sitar and the violin. He was also interested in clay-modelling and in playing chess and tennis. At Oxford he used to play tennis for the Indian majlis. Other interests included geology, photography, archaeology and numismatics. In 1936 he examined some coins and moulds dating to 100 BC from a dig in Khokra Kot and wrote on the possible methods involved in the casting of the coins. The collection is now at the National Museum at New Delhi. He was much liked by his nieces and nephews who called him tamashewala uncle for entertaining them with a monkey-hand-puppet named Gippy.

== Selected publications ==
A full list of publications can be found in Appendix 3 of Gupta (1978). The following are a selection of Sahni's publications.

- 1915. Foreign pollen in the ovules of Ginkgo and its significance in the study of fossil plants. New Phytol. 14 (4 and 5), 149–151.
- 1915. The anatomy of Nephrolepis volzibilis J. Sim, with remarks on the biology and morphology of the genus. New Phytol. 14 (8 and 9), 251–274.
- 1916. The vascular anatomy of the tubers of Nephrolepis. New Phytol. 15 (3 and 4), 72–80.
- 1917. Observations on the evolution of branching in the Filicales. New Phytol. 16 (1 and 2), 1–23.
- 1919. (With J. C. Willis.) Lawson's text book of botany. London: Univ. Tut. Press.
- 1919. On an Australian specimen of Clepsydropsis. Ann. Bot. 33 (129), 81–92.
- 1920. (With A. C. Seward) Indian Gondwana plants: a revision. Mem. Geol. Surv. Ind. Pal. Ind. 7 (I), 1–40.
- 1921. A stem impression from the plant-bearing beds near Khunmu (Kashmir), provisionally referred to Gangamopteris Kashmirensis Seward. Proc. (8th Ind. Sci. Cong. Cal.) Asiat. Sac. Beng. (N.S.), 17 (4), 200.
- 1921. The present position of Indian Palaeobotany. Pres. Add. 8th Ind. Sci. Cong. Cal. Proc. Asiat. Sac. Bengal (N.S.), 17 (4), 152–175.
- 1924. On the anatomy of some petrified plants from the Government Museum, Madras. Proc. 11th Ind. Sci. Cong. Bangalore, p. 141.
- 1925. The ontogeny of vascular plants and the theory of recapitulation. J. Ind. Bot. Soc. 4 (6), 202–216.
- 1925. (With E. J. Bradshaw) A fossil tree in the Panchet Series of the Lower Gondwanas near Asansol. Rec. Geol. Surv. Ind. 58 (I), 77–79.
- 1931. On certain fossil epiphytic ferns found on the stems of the Palaeozoic tree-fern Psaronius. Proc. 18th Ind. Sci. Cong. Nagpur, p. 270.
- 1931. Materials for a monograph of the Indian petrified palms. Proc. Acad. Sci. U.P. 1, 140–144.
- 1932. Homoxylon rajmalzalense gen. et sp. nov., a fossil angiospermous wood, devoid of vessels, from the Rajmahal Hills, Behar. Mem. Geol. Sura. Ind. Pal. Ind. 20 (2), 1–19.
- 1932. A petrified Williamsonia (W. Sewardiana, sp. nov.) from the Rajmahal Hills, India. Mem. Geol. Sura. Ind. Pal. Ind. 20 (3), 1–19.
- 1933. (With A. R. Rao) On some Jurassic plants from the Rajmahal hills. J. Asiat. Soc. Bengal (N.S.), 27 (2), 183–208.
- 1933. Explosive fruits in Viscum japonicum Thunb. J. Ind. Bat. Soc. 12 (2), 96–101.
- 1934. (With B. P. Srivastava) The silicified flora of the Deccan Intertrappean Series. Pt. 3. Sausarospermum Fermori. gen. et sp. nov. Proc. 21st Ind. Sci. Cong. Bombay, p. 318.
- 1934. Dr S. K. Mukerji, F.L.S. (1896–1934). (Obituary.) J. Ind. Bot. Soc. 13 (3), 245–249.
- 1934. (With A. R. Rao) Rajmahalia paradoxa gen. et sp. nov. and other Jurassic plants from the Rajmahal hills. Proc. Ind. Acad. Sci. 1 (6), 258–269.
- 1934. Dr Dukinfied Henry Scott. (Obituary). Curr. Sci. 2 (lo), 392–395.
- 1934. The Deccan Traps: Are they Cretaceous or Tertiary? Curr. Sci. 3 (lo), 392–395.
- 1935. The relations of the Indian Gondwana flora with those of Siberia and China. Proc. 2nd Cong. of Curb. Stratig. Heerlen, Holland. Compte Rendti I,517–518.
- 1935. Homoxylon and related woods and the origin of angiosperms. Proc. 6th Int. Bat. Cong. Amsterdam, 2, 237–238.
- 1935. The Glossopteris flora in India. Proc. 6th Int. Bat. Cong. Amsterdam, 2, 245–248.
- 1936. The Karewas of Kashmir. Curr. Sci. 5 (I), 10–16.
- 1936. The Himalayan uplift since the advent of Man: its culthistorical significance. Curr. Sci. 5 (I), 10–16.
- 1936. A clay seal and sealing of the Shunga period from the Khokra Kot mound (Rohtak). Curr. Sci. 5 (2), 80–81.
- 1936. A supposed Sanskrit seal from Rohtak: A correction. Curr. Sci. 5 (4), 206–215.
- 1936. Wegener's theory of continental drift in the light of palaeobotanical evidence. J. Ind. Bot. Soc. 15 (5), 319–322.
- 1936. The Gondwana affinities of the Angara flora in the light of geological evidence. Nature, 138 (3499, 720–721.
- 1937. Speculations on the climates of the Lower Gondwanas of India. Proc. 17th Int. Geol. Cong. Moscow, pp. 217–218.
- 1937. An appreciation of the late Sir J. C. Bose. Sci. & Cult. 31 (6), 346–347.
- 1937. Professor K. K. Mathur. (Obituary). Curr. Sci. 5 (7), 365–366.
- 1937. Revolutions in the plant world. (Pres. Add.) Proc. Natl. Acad. Sci. Ind. 46–60.
- 1937. The age of the Deccan Trap. (General Discussion.) Proc. 24th Ind. Sci. Cong. Hyderabad, pp. 464–468.
- 1937. Wegener's theory of continental drift with reference to India and adjacent countries. (General discussion.) Proc. 24th Ind. Sci. Cong. Hyderabad, pp. 502–506.
- 1938. (With K. P. Rode)Fossil plants from the Deccan Intertrappean beds at Mohgaon Kalan, C.P., with a note on the geological position of the plant-bearing beds. Proc. Natl. Acad. Sci. Ind. 7 (3), 165–174.
- 1938. Recent advances in Indian Palaeobotany. (Pres. Add. Botany Section.) Proc. 25th Ind. Sci. Cong. Jubil. Sess. Calcutta (2), 133–176; and Luck. Univ. Stud. (2), 1–100.
- 1940. The Deccan Traps: an episode of the Tertiary era. (Gen. Pres. Add.) 27th Ind. Sci. Cong. Mad. (2), pp. 1–21. Prakrati, 3 (I), 15–35. 1944 (Gujrati trans.). Prabuddha Karnataka, 22 (2), 5–19 (Kanares trans. by H. S. Rao).
- 1941. Permanent labels for microscope slides. Curr. Sci. 10 (1 I), 485–486.
- 1942. 'A short history of the plant sciences' and 'The cytoplasm of the plant cell'. Reviews. Curr. Sci. 11 (9), 369–372.
- 1944. (With B. S. Trivedi) The age of the Saline Series in the Punjab Salt Range. Nature, 153, 54.

== Recognition ==
Sahni was recognised by several academies and institutions in India and abroad for his research. He was elected a Fellow of the Royal Society of London (FRS) in 1936, the highest British scientific honour, awarded for the first time to an Indian botanist. He was elected vice-president, Palaeobotany section, of the 5th and 6th International Botanical Congresses of 1930 and 1935, respectively; General President of the Indian Science Congress for 1940; president, National Academy of Sciences, India, 1937–1939 and 1943–1944. In 1948 he was elected an Honorary Member of the American Academy of Arts and Sciences. Another high honour which came to him was his election as an honorary president of the International Botanical Congress, Stockholm in 1950. For his work in numismatics he received the Nelson Wright Medal in 1945.

Maulana Abul Kalam Azad, minister of education in 1947, offered the post of secretary to the Ministry of Education to Sahni. This he reluctantly accepted.

The Birbal Sahni Gold Medal for students of botany was instituted in his memory. A bust of Sahni is placed in the Geological Survey of India headquarters in Calcutta.

== Cited references ==
Gupta, Shakti M. (1978). Birbal Sahni. New Delhi: National Book Trust.
