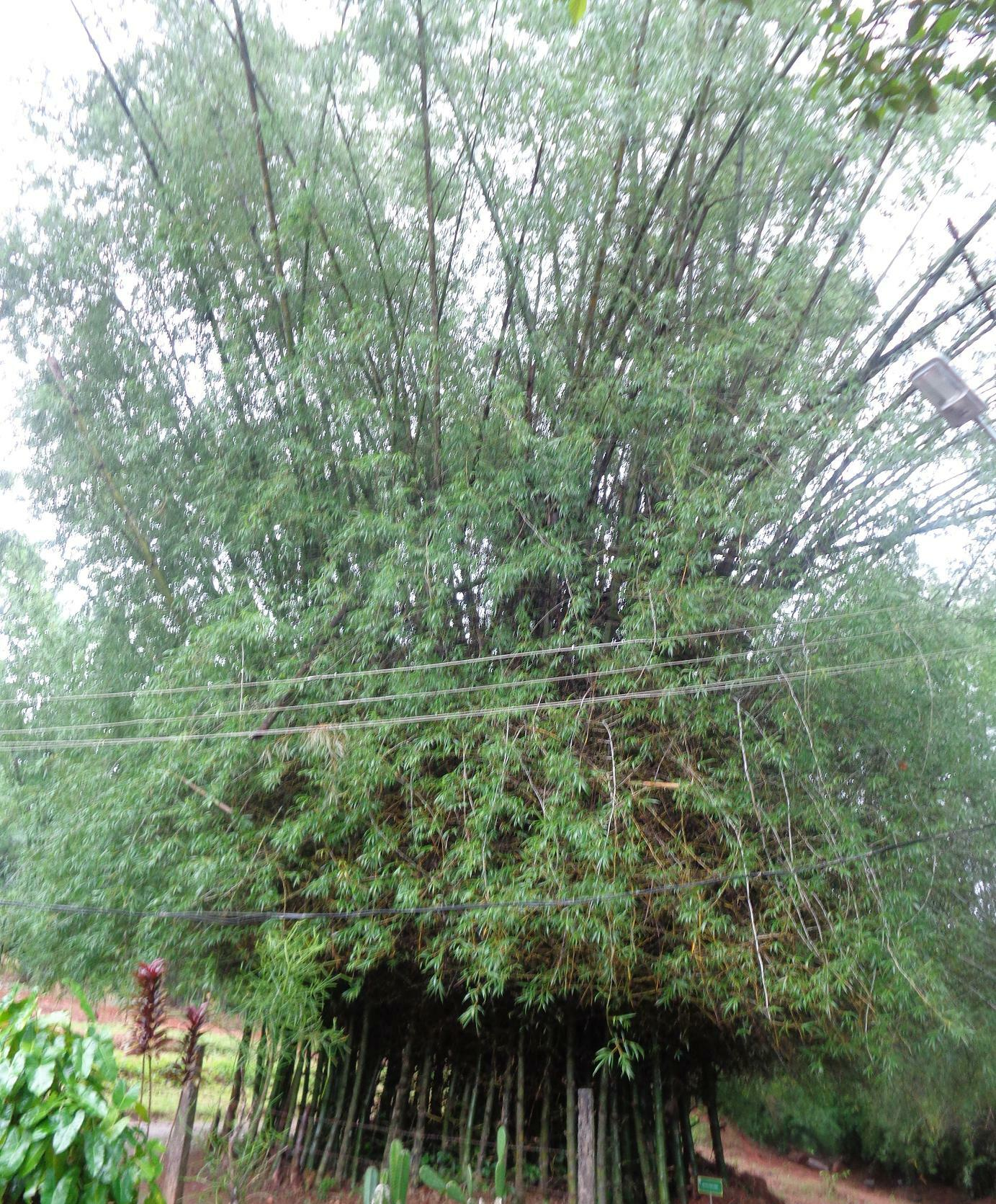
- In the botanical gardens of Kerala Forest Research Institute, Veluppadam, Kerala, India

Scientific classification
- Kingdom: Plantae
- Clade: Tracheophytes
- Clade: Angiosperms
- Clade: Monocots
- Clade: Commelinids
- Order: Poales
- Family: Poaceae
- Genus: Bambusa
- Species: B. bambos

Binomial name
- Bambusa bambos (L.) Voss

= Bambusa bambos =

Species of grass

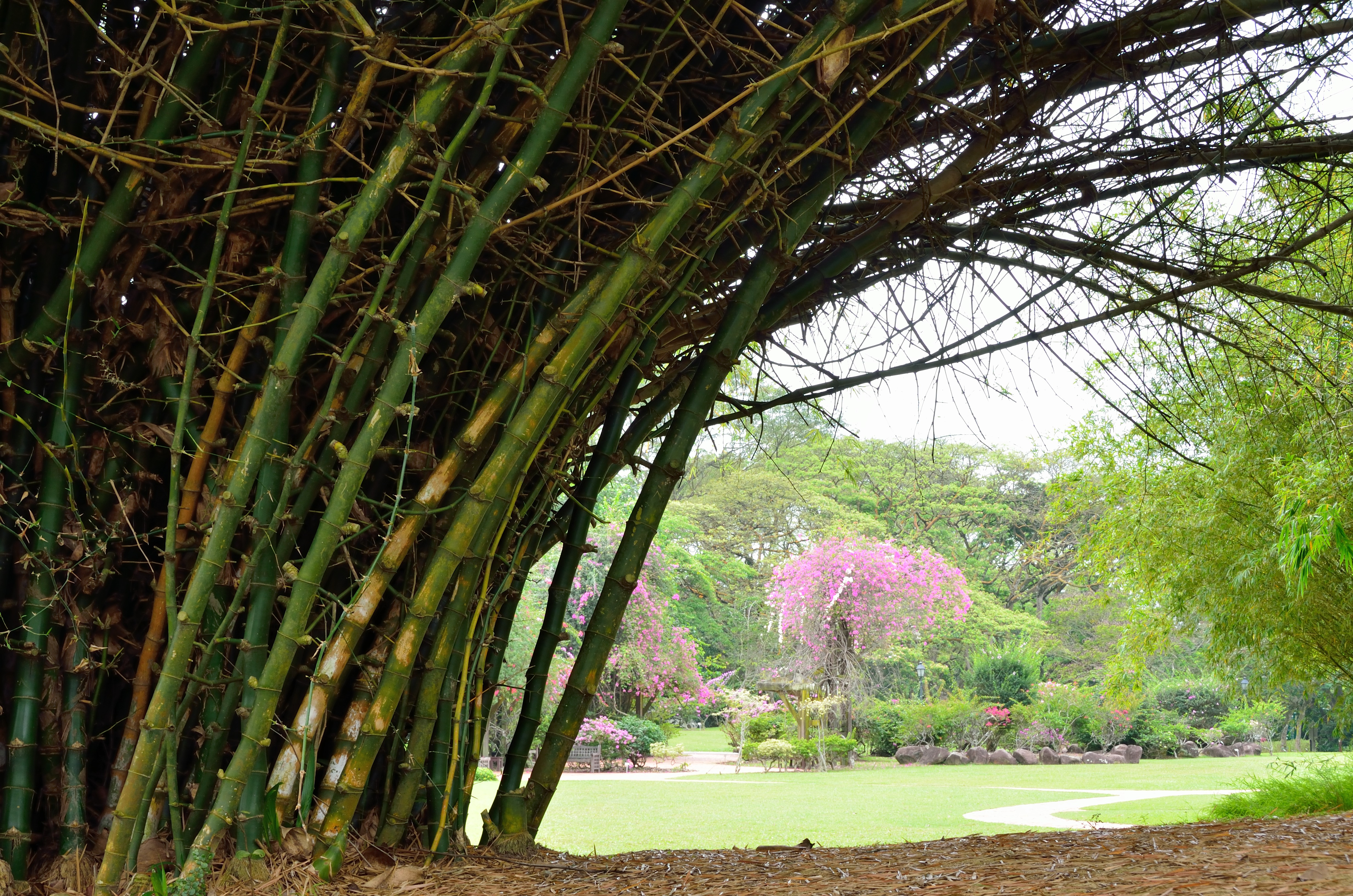
in the Singapore Botanic Gardens

Bambusa bambos, (synonym Gigantichloa maxima) the giant thorny bamboo, Indian thorny bamboo, spiny bamboo, or thorny bamboo (but see Bambusa spinosa) is a species of clumping bamboo native to southern Asia (India, Pakistan, Bangladesh, Sri Lanka and Indochina). It is also naturalized in Seychelles, Central America, West Indies, Java, Malaysia, Maluku, and the Philippines.

== Habit ==
It is a tall, bright-green colored spiny bamboo species, which grows in thickets consisting of a large number of heavily branched, closely growing culms. It reaches a height of 10–35 m and grows naturally in the forests of the dry zones. It is very fast growing, lengthening up to 50 cm in the twelve night-time hours. Since most of the growth is at night, it probably practices Crassulacean Acid Metabolism or CAM. The record growth for this species is 90 cm in 24 hours at Kew Gardens near London in 1855.

== Appearance ==
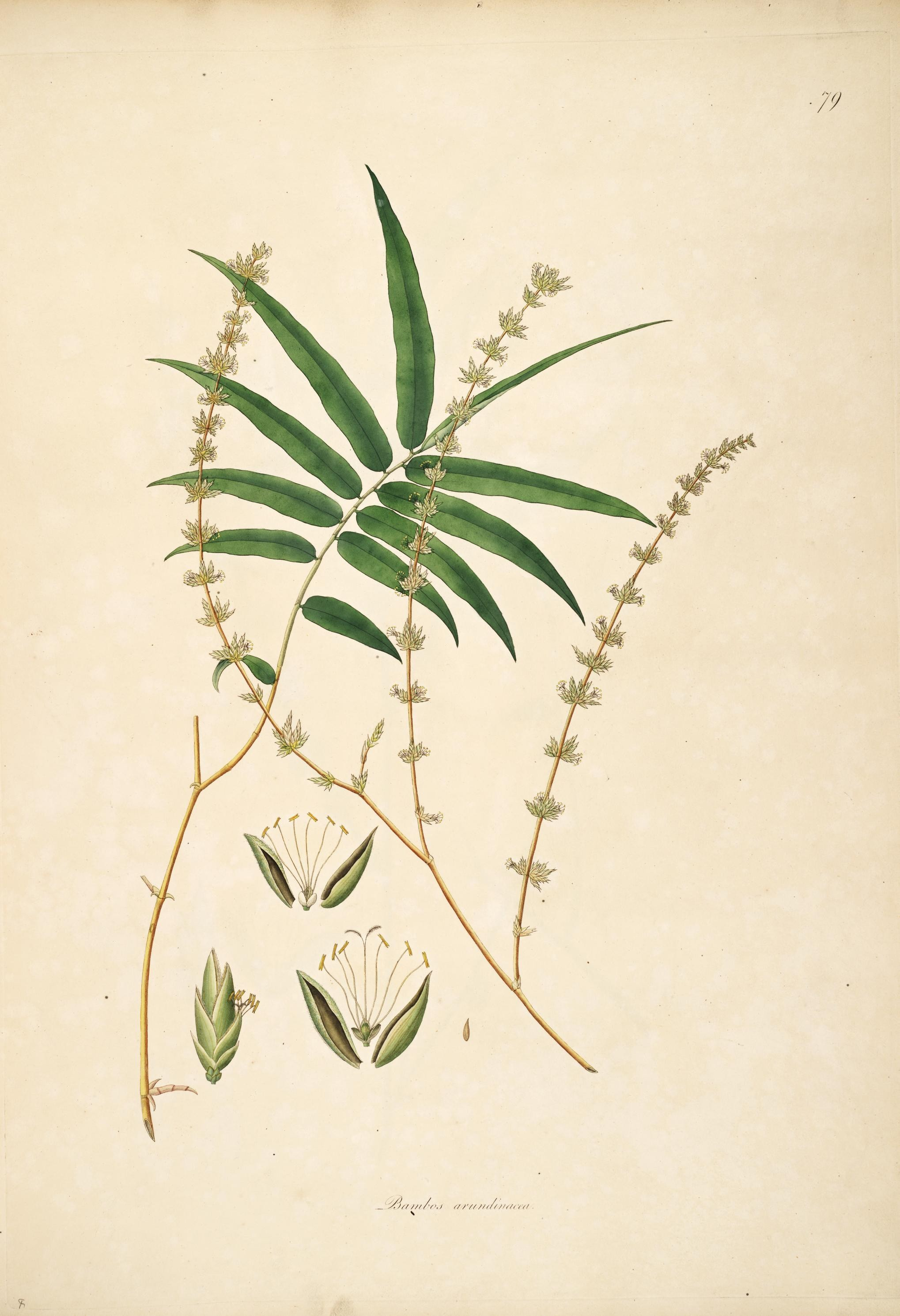
Illustration of leaves, fruits and flowers.

The culms are not straight, and are armed with stout, curved spines. They are bright green, becoming brownish green when drying, and the young shoots are deep purple. Branches spread out from the base. Aerial roots reach up to few nodes above. The internode length is 15–46 cm, and diameter is 3.0–20 cm, and the culm walls are 2.5–5.0 cm thick. Nodes are prominent and rootstock is stout.

Culm sheaths are dark brown when mature, elongated, and cylindrical. Length of the sheath proper is 15–25 cm and 12–30 cm in width. Blade length is 4.0–12 cm. Auricles are not prominent. Upper surfaces of the sheath are covered with blackish-brown hairs. Lower surfaces of the sheath are not hairy. Sheaths fall early.

== Uses ==
They are extensively used in many applications, mainly for making bridges and for ladders. Leaves are used for thatching.

== See also ==
- Domesticated plants and animals of Austronesia

== Bibliography ==
- Fern, Ken. "Bambusa bambos". Useful Tropical Plants. January 1, 2016.
