= Ruchi Ram Sahni =

Indian scientist and educationist

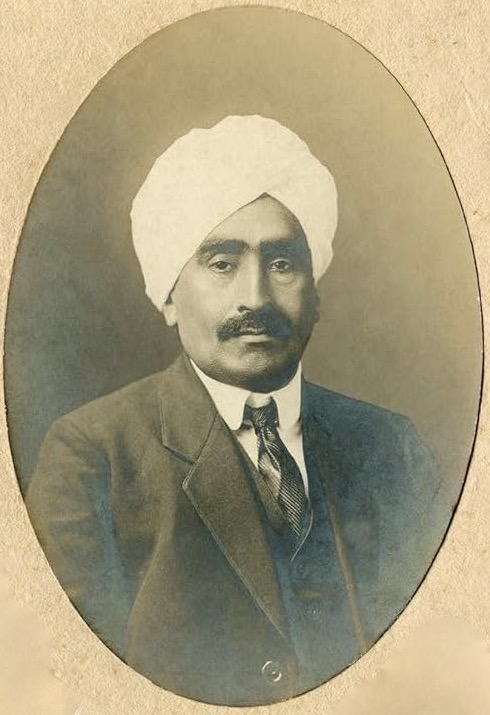
- Portrait of Ruchi Ram Sahni, May 1919
- Born: Dera Ismail Khan, Punjab Province, British India
- Died: Mumbai, India
- Children: Birbal Sahni

Ruchi Ram Sahni (5 April 1863 – 3 June 1948) was an Indian scientist and educationist active during the pre-partition era in Punjab. A pioneer meteorologist and physicist, he was the father of renowned paleobotanist Birbal Sahni.

== Early life ==
Sahni was born on 5 April 1863 at Dera Ismail Khan a city on west bank of the Indus River (now in Pakistan). His father's name was Karam Chand Sahni who was a merchant and his mother's name Gulab Devi who belonged to a money-lending family of Pind Dadan Khan. A downfall in the business led to the family being left without much money forced Sahni to strive and fend for himself. While at high school he was influenced by the Brahma Samaj and joined it leading to clash with his mother and estrangement from family. Ruchi Ram Sahni was a brilliant student he completed his matriculation from Government School Lahore in 1881 and BA in 1884 in which he stood first in the University in December 1885. Sahni visited Presidency college, Calcutta as a trainee meteorologist under Henry Francis Blanford and guest student in 1885 where he interacted with leading personalities of Bengal. In 1886 he took up a position of assistant professor of chemistry at the Government College at Lahore and worked there until 1918.

== Research in Europe ==
While working as a professor at Government College, Lahore, Ruchi Ram took a study leave in 1914 to research the variability in atomic weights of Lead and Bismuth under the mentorship of Kazimierz Fajans at Technische Hochshule of Karlsruhe, Germany now known as Karlsruhe Institute of Technology. A few months after his joining Germany went into war against allied forces which included United Kingdom of Great Britain. As a result, Ruchi Ram had to leave Germany hurriedly and went to Manchester in the Lab of Ernest Rutherford who was also mentor of Prof. Kazimierz Fajans. Together with Rutherford Ruchi Ram published two papers in the field of physical chemistry. When he went to Manchester, two of his sons were already in UK, the eldest one was studying medicine at London and his second son Birbal Sahni, a pioneer in Paleobotany was studying Botany at Cambridge. During his vacations, Birbal Sahni assisted his father to produce photographic plates of latter's experiments.

== Political and social involvement ==
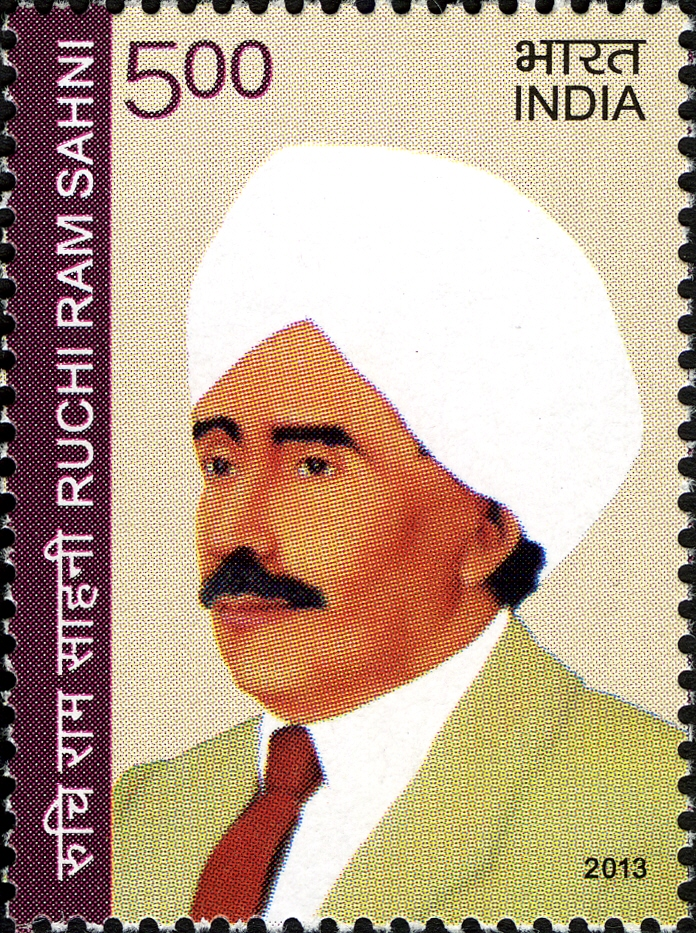
Ruchi Ram Sahni on a 2013 stamp of India.

On his return from Germany, Professor Ruchi Ram Sahni became more involved in political and social movements in Punjab. He retired as a senior Professor of Chemistry from Govt. College, Lahore in April 1918 and fully immersed himself in the freedom struggle being waged against the British Empire by the Congress. He was deputed by Mahatma Gandhi to visit Guru ka Bagh Morcha (Amritsar district) in 1921 where the brave Sikhs offered non-violent resistance to the British and won the battle for possession of Gurdwara. Professor Sahni was so much involved in Sikh affairs of his time that he gave an eye-witness account of the Sikh struggle for liberation of their religious shrines in his well-documented book "Gurdwara Reform Movement". He was a founder Trustee of "The Tribune" which started its publication from Lahore, and a founder member of Dyal Singh College and Library, also set up in Lahore.

== Family ==
Ruchi Ram was married to Ishwari Devi. The pair had 5 sons Bikramjit, Birbal, Bodh Raj, Manohar Lal, Mulk Raj and 4 daughters Ram Rakhi Chandiok, Lajwanti Sabherwal, Leelawati Kohli, and Lakhwanti Malhotra. His eldest son Bikramjit Sahni studied medicine from Edinburgh and London, the second son Birbal was DSc (Cambridge), Scd, Cantab.FRS, third son was Bodh Raj Bar-at-Law, London, fourth Manohar Lal, a Rubber Technologist, UK and fifth was Mulk Raj PhD, ScD, Cantab; DSc Imperial College, London. Birbal Sahni established the Birbal Sahni Institute of Palaeobotany in Lucknow, India. While Mulk Raj Sahni founded Department of Geology at Panjab University, Chandigarh India and published two papers in Nature. Among Ruchi Ram`s daughters Leelawati was the first women graduate of Panjab University. Several of Ruchi Rams grandsons and granddaughters went on to become renowned educationist. Among them Prof Ashok Sahni followed the traditions of his father Mulk Raj and Uncle Birbal and became Prof. of Paleogeology at Punjab University Chandigarh. He has about 90 peer reviewed publication in International journals including several in renowned journals- Science and Nature. Ashok Sahni discovered fossils of new species of Indian Dinosaurs.
