= Rajendra Nath Lakhanpal =

Indian paleobotanist (1923–2012)

Rajendra Nath Lakhanpal (5 August 1923 – 19 January 2012) was an Indian paleobotanist. He was a specialist on palaeo-ecology and the identification of plants from pollen microfossils.

Lakhanpal received a master's degree from the University of Lucknow in 1944 and joined Birbal Sahni as a research assistant in palynology, with funding from the Burmah Oil Company. He moved to the Institute of Paleobotany upon its founding in 1949 and worked on tertiary plant fossils and microfossils from the Salt Range. He received a PhD for studies under Sahni in 1952 from the University of Lucknow and then went on a UNESCO scholarship to work under R.W. Chaney at the University of California, Berkeley where he conducted studies on fossils of the Upper Oligocene from Oregon. He returned to work at the Birbal Sahni Institute of Palaeobotany. His work was on palaeoecology based on palynology and came up with the idea that the temperate Himalayan flora entered in the Miocene. His discovery of Nipa sahnii from the Assam Tertiary suggested to him that the Bay of Bengal stretched much further north in the Miocene. Other species that he described include Mallaoxylon keriense from the Deccan traps, Mesuoxylon arcotense from Arcot District, Palmoxylon surangei, Tetrameloxylon prenudiflora, fossil Rhamnaceae from the Lower Siwaliks and fossil Moraceae. He died from pneumonia at Lucknow. He published The Antiquity of Angiosperms (1979) and coauthored a Catalogue of the Indian Fossil Plants in 1975. He was elected a Fellow of the Indian Academy of Sciences in 1976.
