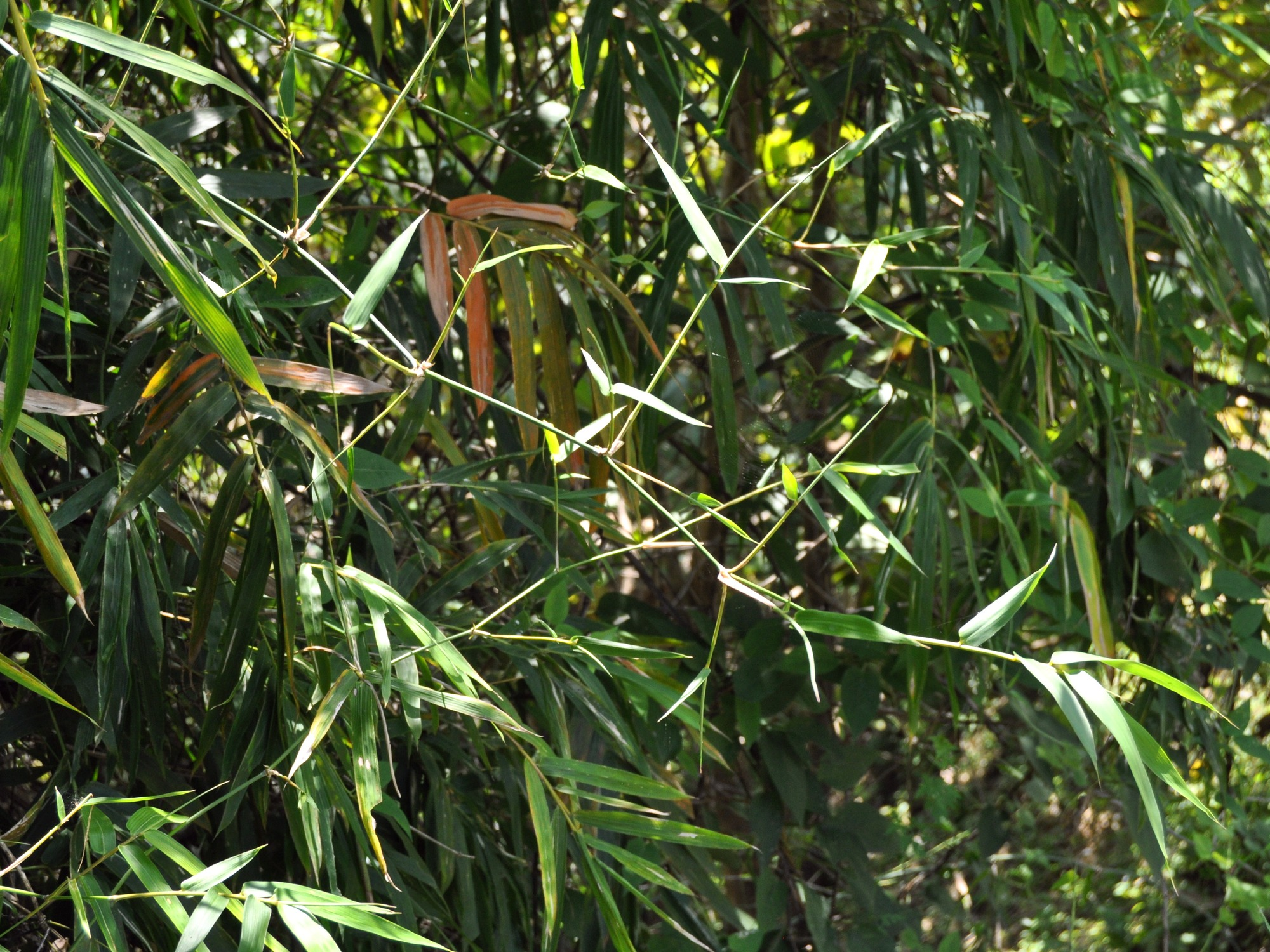
- B. blumeana leaves
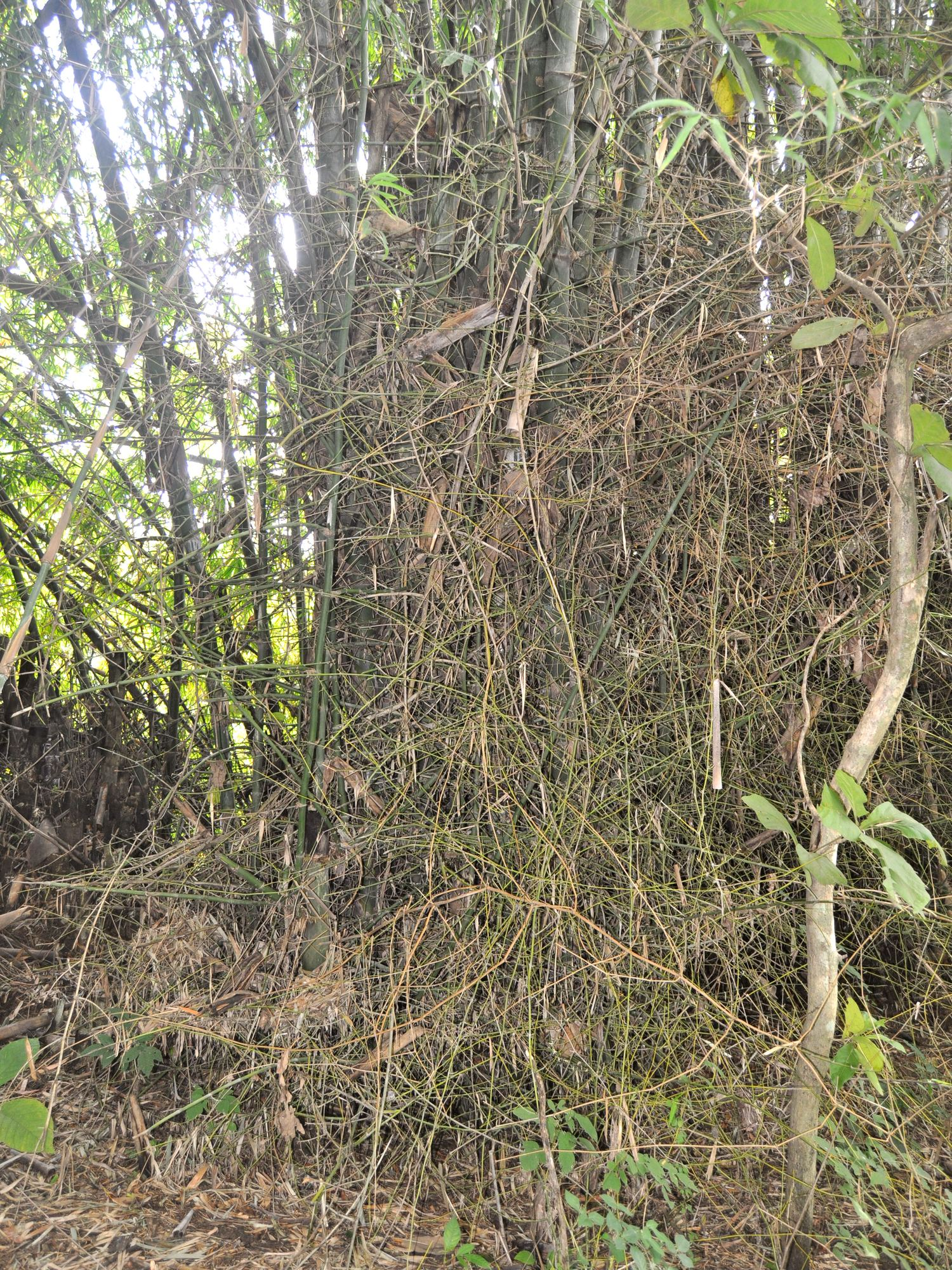
- Thorny bamboo: B. blumeana habit

Scientific classification
- Kingdom: Plantae
- Clade: Tracheophytes
- Clade: Angiosperms
- Clade: Monocots
- Clade: Commelinids
- Order: Poales
- Family: Poaceae
- Genus: Bambusa
- Species: B. spinosa

Binomial name
- Bambusa spinosa Roxb.

Synonyms
- Schizostachyum durie Rupr. Ischurochloa stenostachya (Hack.) Nakai; Bambusa teba Miq. Bambusa stenostachya Hack. Bambusa blumeana Roem. & Schult.f. Bambusa pungens Blanco; Bambusa blumeana var. luzonensis Arundarbor pungens (Blanco) Kuntze; Arundarbor blumeana (Schult.) Kuntze

= Bambusa spinosa =

Species of grass

Bambusa spinosa, also known as B. blumeana, spiny bamboo or thorny bamboo, although in this respect it may be confused with Bambusa bambos, is a species of clumping bamboo occurring in Tropical Asia.

== Description ==
Culms (stems) of Bambusa blumeana are up to 25 m (82 ft) long and slightly arched. At the base they are up to 15 cm (6 in) thick with walls 2 to 3 cm (0.8 to 1.2 in) thick, or may be solid. The stem consists of a number of short sections separated by nodes. The main branches are borne on the upper half of the culms, those on the lower part being slender and armed with thorns. The leaves are alternate, lanceolate, and up to 20 cm (8 in) long, and one grows from each node, with the lower part of the leaf sheathing the stem.

== Distribution and habitat ==
Where Bambusa blumeana originated is unclear, but it may have been native to Indonesia and Borneo. Its range now includes the Philippines, Thailand, Vietnam, southern China and Japan. It has also been introduced to Madagascar, Guam, and some other Indo-Pacific islands. Its natural habitat is hillsides, valley bottoms and stream banks, where it forms tangled thickets, at altitudes up to about 300 m (1,000 ft). It tolerates acid soils, clay and occasional flooding, but not saline soils.

== Uses ==
Young shoots of Bambusa blumeana are boiled and eaten as a vegetable, being harvested when they first emerge from the ground. The plant is used as a living fence between fields, as a windbreak around homesteads and to prevent erosion on river banks. The poles are useful as a lightweight scaffolding but are not durable enough for building construction; other uses include basket-making, furniture manufacture, parquet, toys, chopsticks and kitchen utensils. The culms of this bamboo, along with those of Dendrocalamus asper, are the main source of bamboo pulp used to make paper.

Bambusa blumeana is sometimes cultivated as an ornamental plant. Propagation can be from seed, but the plant only flowers once every few years, so seed is often unavailable. Clumps can be divided when new growth is commencing, or culms can be cut into sections and used as cuttings.

== See also ==
- Manipur Ice Age bamboo fossil

== Gallery ==
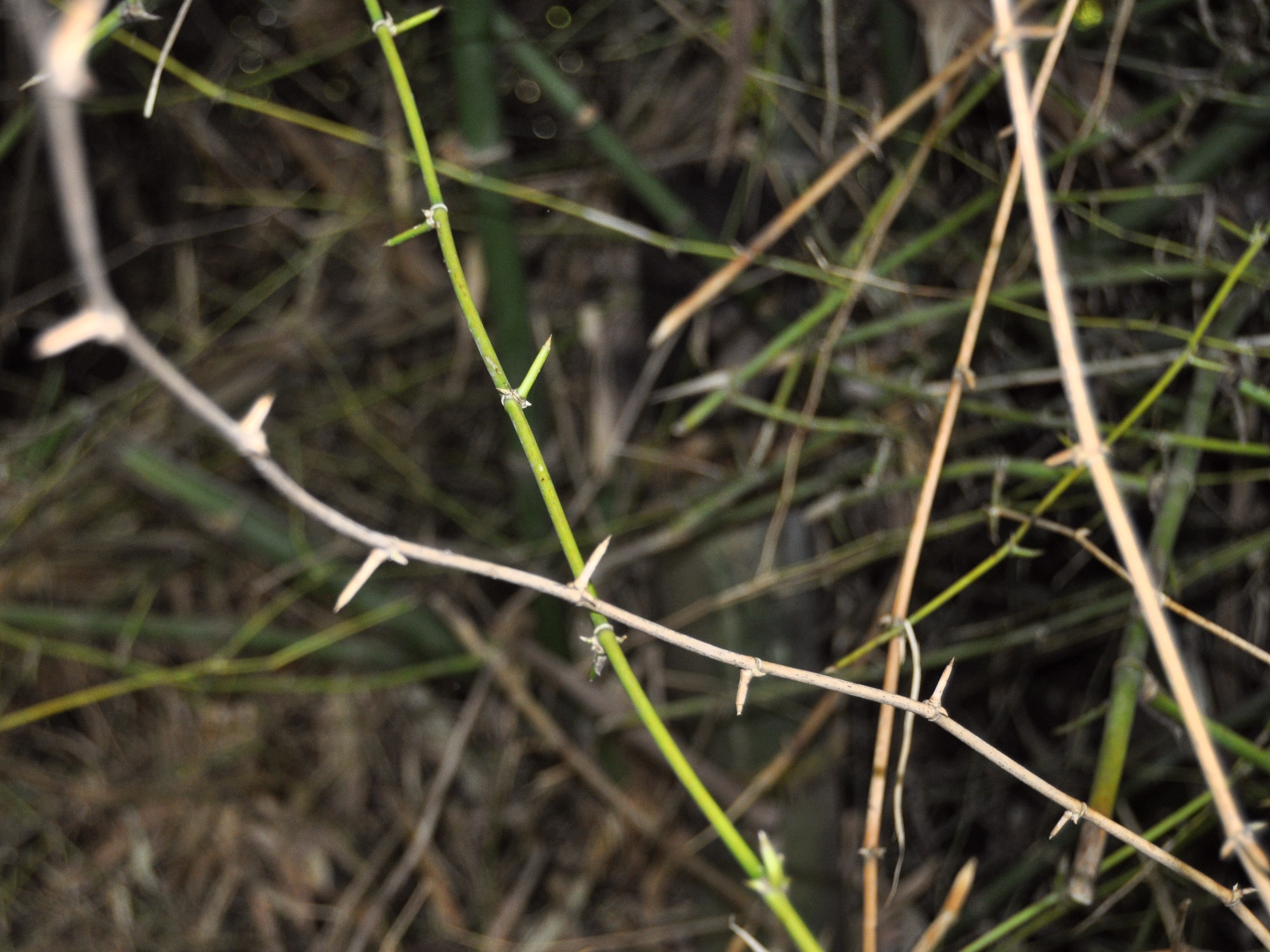
Bambusa blumeana's spines

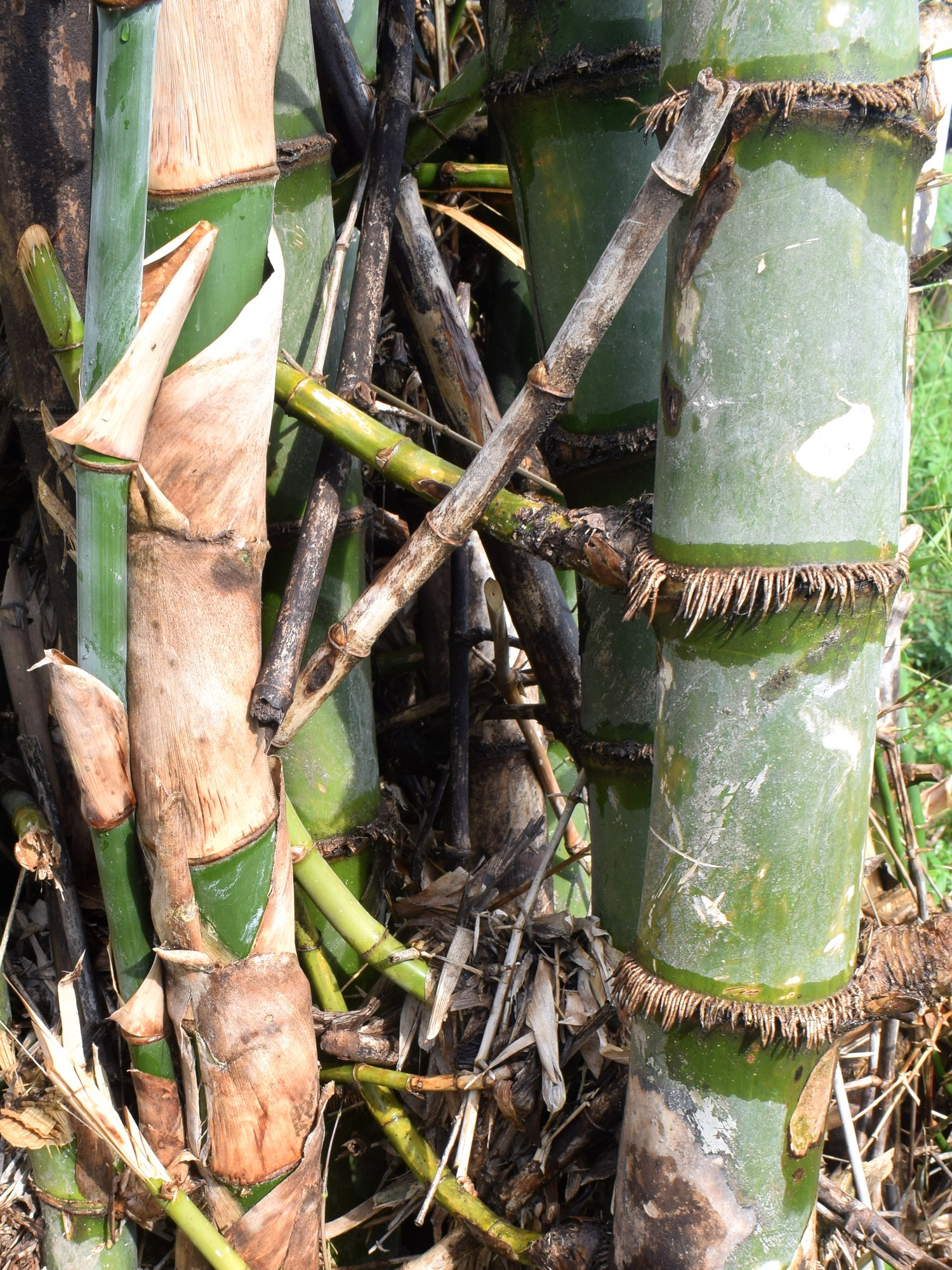
Bambusa blumeana's lower culms
