= Bamboo shoot =

Edible shoots of many bamboo species

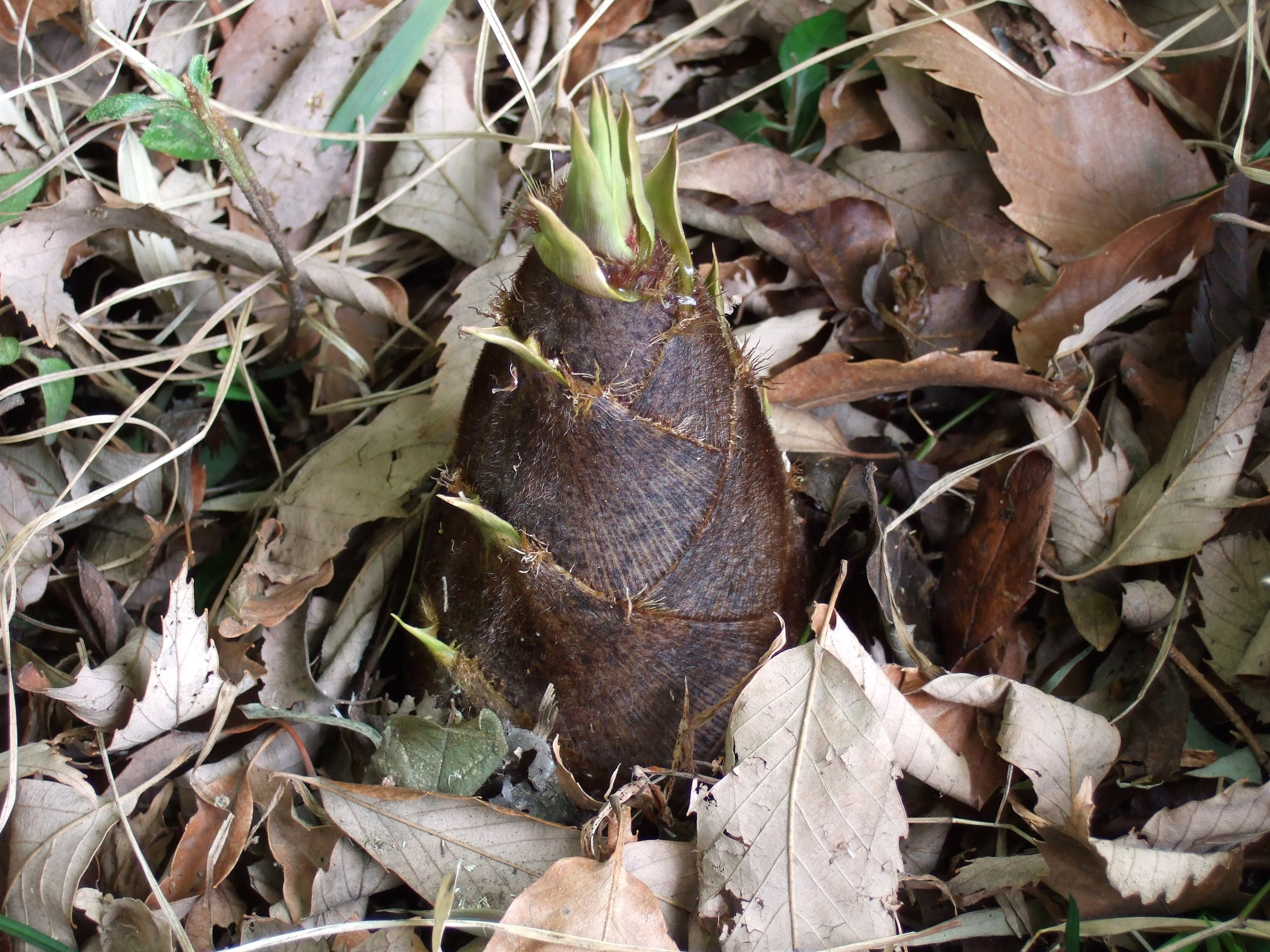
- Edible bamboo shoots

Chinese name
- Traditional Chinese: 竹筍
- Simplified Chinese: 竹笋
Transcriptions
Standard Mandarin
- Hanyu Pinyin: zhúsǔn
- IPA: [ʈʂǔ.swə̀n]
Yue: Cantonese
- Jyutping: zuk1-seon2
- IPA: [tsʊk̚˥.sɵn˧˥]

Korean name
- Hangul: 죽순, 대나무싹
Transcriptions
- Revised Romanization: juk sun, daenamu ssak

Japanese name
- Kanji: 竹の子 or 筍
- Kana: タケノコ
Transcriptions
- Romanization: takenoko

Bamboo shoots, raw
Nutritional value per 100 g (3.5 oz)
- Energy: 115 kJ (27 kcal)
- Carbohydrates: 5.2 g
- Sugars: 3 g
- Dietary fibre: 2.2 g
- Fat: 0.3 g
- Protein: 2.6 g
Vitamins and minerals
| Vitamins | Quantity %DV^{†} |
| Thiamine (B1) | 13% 0.15 mg |
| Riboflavin (B2) | 5% 0.07 mg |
| Niacin (B3) | 4% 0.6 mg |
| Pantothenic acid (B5) | 3% 0.161 mg |
| Vitamin B6 | 14% 0.24 mg |
| Folate (B9) | 2% 7 μg |
| Vitamin C | 4% 4 mg |
| Vitamin E | 7% 1 mg |
| Minerals | Quantity %DV^{†} |
| Iron | 3% 0.5 mg |
| Manganese | 11% 0.262 mg |
| Phosphorus | 5% 59 mg |
| Potassium | 18% 533 mg |
| Zinc | 10% 1.1 mg |
- Link to USDA Database entry
- ^{†}Percentages estimated using US recommendations for adults, except for potassium, which is estimated based on expert recommendation from the National Academies.

Bamboo shoots or bamboo sprouts are the edible shoots (new bamboo culms that come out of the ground) of many bamboo species including Bambusa vulgaris and Phyllostachys edulis. They are used as vegetables in numerous Asian dishes and broths. They are sold in various processed shapes and are available in fresh, dried, and canned versions.

Raw bamboo shoots contain cyanogenic glycosides, natural toxins also contained in cassava. The toxins must be destroyed by thorough cooking, and for this reason, fresh bamboo shoots are boiled before being used in other ways. The toxins are also destroyed in the canning process.

== Harvested species ==
Most young bamboo shoots are edible after being boiled to remove toxins, but only around a hundred or so species are harvested regularly for edible shoots. These are usually from species that are also cultivated for other uses. These include:

- Acidosasa – native to South China and Vietnam

- Acidosasa edulis – endemic to the provinces of Fujian, Zhejiang and Jiangxi, China.
- Acidosasa chinensis – endemic to Guangdong, China

- Bambusa – the most commonly harvested bamboo in tropical and subtropical Asia, occurring from the Philippines to India, and from Sumatra to southern China.

- Bambusa balcooa – native to the Indian subcontinent to Mainland Southeast Asia
- Bambusa bambos – native to South Asia
- Bambusa beecheyana – native to South China to Mainland Southeast Asia and Taiwan
- Bambusa blumeana – native to Island Southeast Asia
- Bambusa gibboides – native to Guangdong, China
- Bambusa merrilliana – endemic to the Philippines
- Bambusa odashimae – endemic to Taiwan
- Bambusa oldhamii – native to Taiwan and South China
- Bambusa polymorpha – native to Mainland Southeast Asia, Bangladesh, and northeastern India.
- Bambusa philippinensis – endemic to the Philippines
- Bambusa tulda – native to the Himalayas region, Yunnan, and northern Mainland Southeast Asia
- Bambusa tuldoides – native to Guangdong, Guangxi, and northern Mainland Southeast Asia
- Bambusa vulgaris – native to Mainland Southeast Asia and Yunnan, China

- Chimonobambusa – native to the Himalayas, Mainland Southeast Asia, China, and Japan
- Dendrocalamus – native to tropical South Asia, Southeast Asia, and South China

- Dendrocalamus asper – native to Southeast Asia
- Dendrocalamus latiflorus – native to South China and Taiwan
- Dendrocalamus membranaceus – native to tropical Southeast Asia
- Dendrocalamus strictus – native to tropical Southeast Asia and India

- Gigantochloa – native to tropical Asia

- Gigantochloa atter – native to Island Southeast Asia
- Gigantochloa levis – native to Island Southeast Asia

- Phyllostachys – native from the Himalayas to East Asia

- Phyllostachys edulis – native to South China and Taiwan
- Phyllostachys bambusoides – native to China, Taiwan, and Japan
- Phyllostachys rivalis – endemic to China
- Phyllostachys vivax – endemic to China

- Sasa – native to Korea, Japan, and eastern Russia (Sakhalin)
  Sasa kurilensis – native to Korea, Japan, and eastern Russia (Sakhalin)

Freshly collected bamboo shoots are a good source of thiamine, niacin, vitamin A, vitamin B6, and vitamin E. 17 different amino acids have been reported, 8 of them essential for humans. The amount of amino acids in canned and fermented shoots is lower than when freshly prepared.

== Uses ==
=== Culinary ===
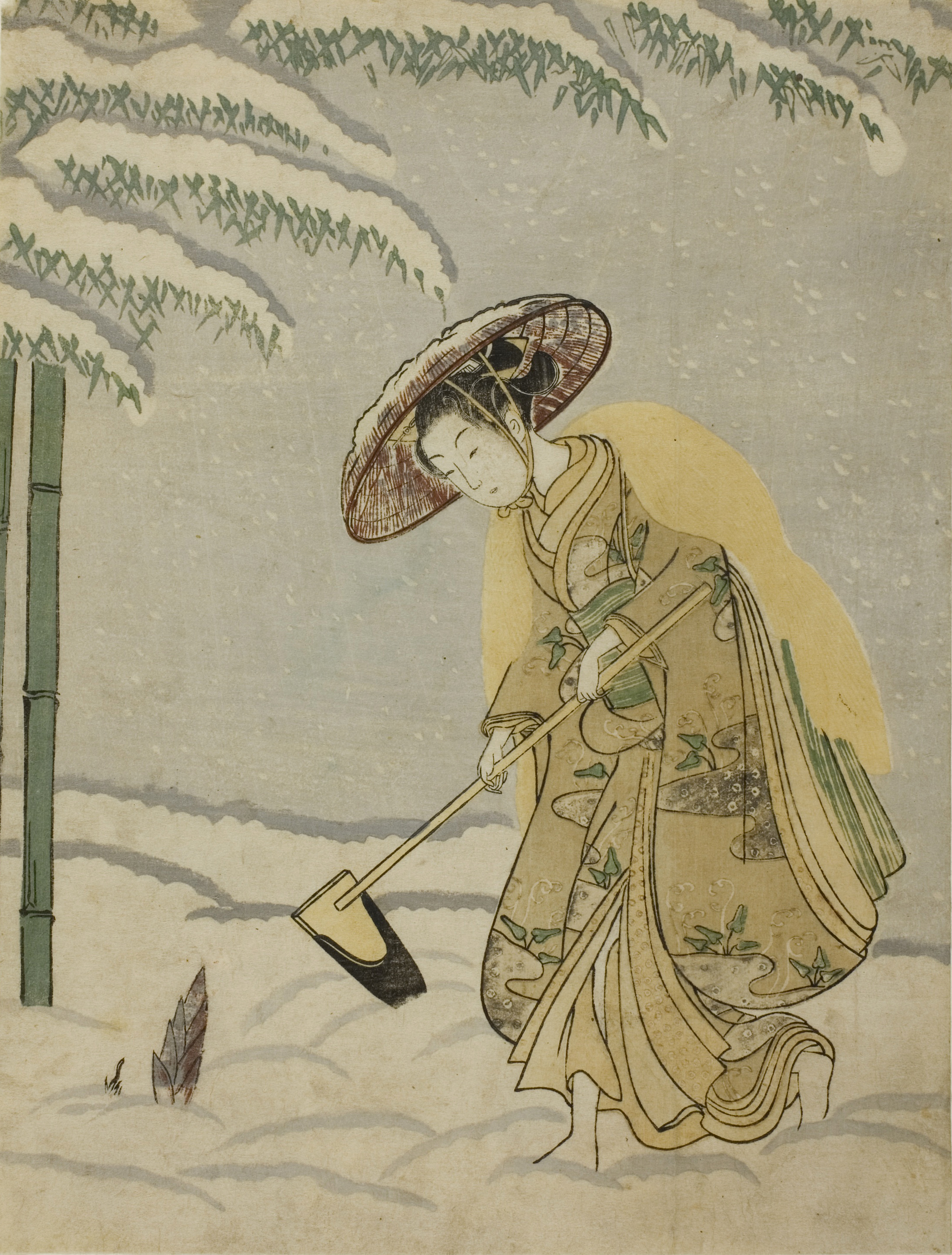
Woman gathering bamboo shoots (woodblock print by Suzuki Harunobu, 1765)

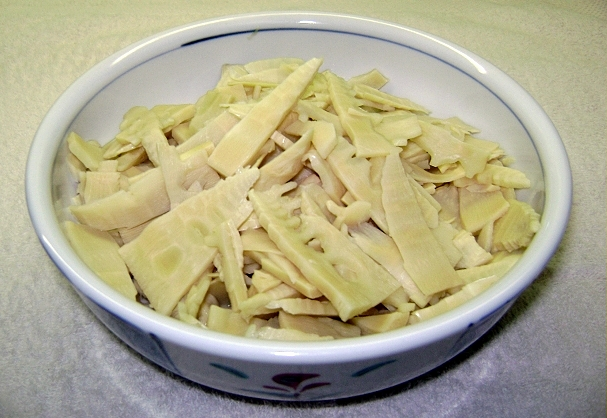
Steamed ryoku-chiku (Bambusa oldhamii) shoots

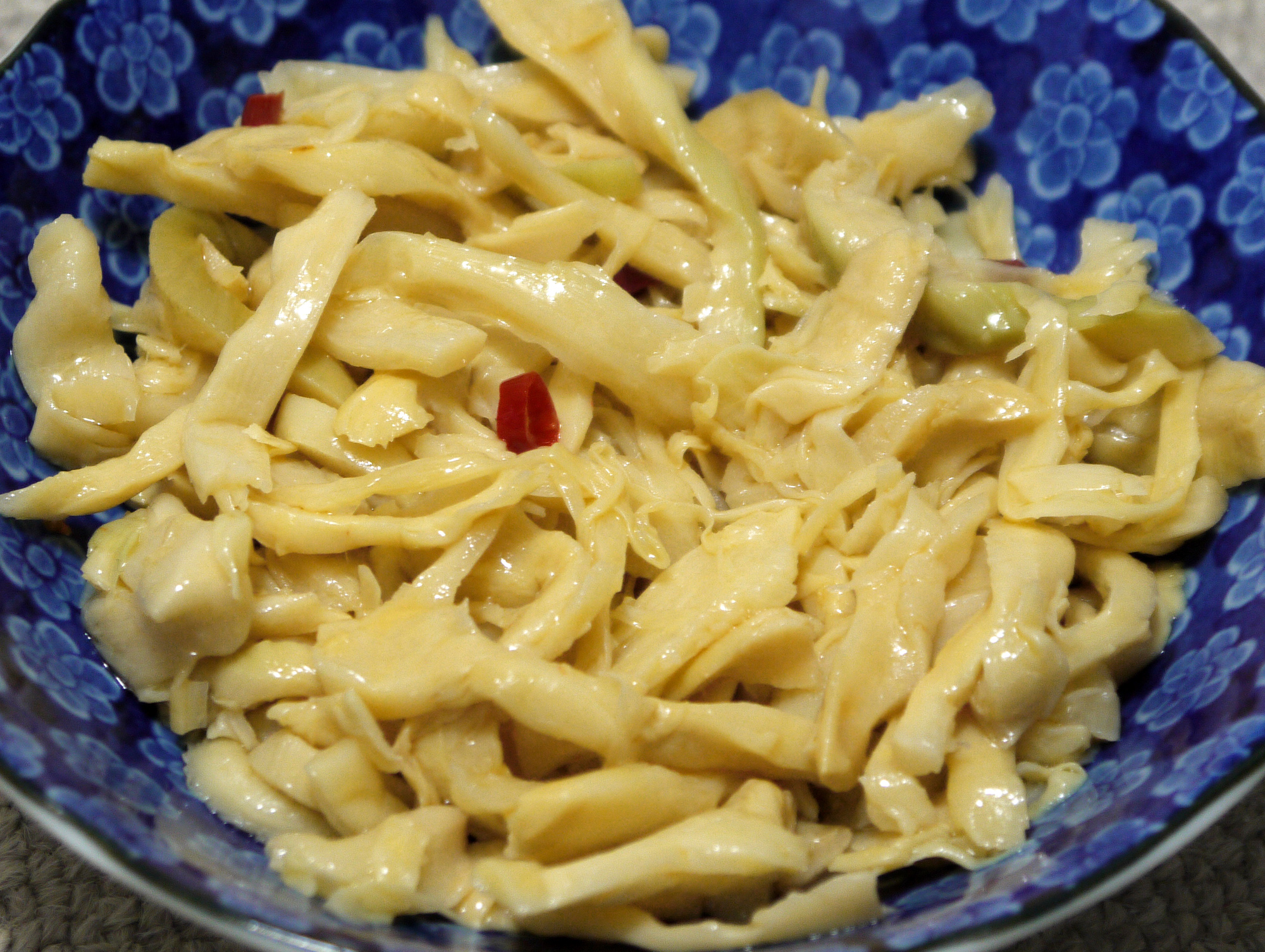
Hosaki-menma

Raw bamboo is toxic to humans, containing cyanide compounds, hence it is always boiled when used for human consumption. The diets of giant pandas and red pandas are largely made up of raw bamboo; the animals' body tissue is not well able to detoxify cyanide, but their gut microbiomes are significantly enriched in putative genes coding for enzymes related to cyanide degradation, suggesting that they have cyanide-digesting gut microbes.

==== East Asia ====
In certain parts of Japan, China, and Taiwan, shoots from the giant timber bamboo Bambusa oldhamii are harvested in spring or early summer. Young shoots from this species are highly sought-after due to their crisp texture and sweet taste. Older shoots, however, have an acrid flavor and should be sliced thin and boiled in a large volume of water several times. The sliced bamboo is edible after boiling. B. oldhamii is more widely known as a noninvasive landscaping bamboo.

Pickled bamboo, used as a condiment, may also be made from the pith of the young shoots. In Japan, menma is a common topping for ramen noodle soup. In China, luosifen river snail noodles, a popular dish from Guangxi, get their famously pungent smell from pickled bamboo shoots.

==== South Asia ====
In Nepal, they are used in dishes that have been well known in the country for centuries. A popular dish is tama (fermented bamboo shoot), made with potato and beans. An old popular song in Nepali mentions tama as "my mother loves vegetable of recipe containing potato, beans, and tama". Some varieties of bamboo shoots commonly grown in the Sikkim Himalayas of India are Dendrocalamus hamiltonii, Dendrocalamus sikkimensis and Bambusa tulda, locally known as choya bans, bhalu bans and karati bans. These are edible when young. These bamboo shoots are collected, defoliated and boiled in water with turmeric powder for 10–15 minutes to remove the bitter taste of the bamboo after which the tama is ready for consumption. Tama is commonly sold in local markets during the months of June to September when young bamboo shoots sprout.

In Assam, bamboo shoot is called bah gaj in Assamese and hen-up in Karbi. It is an integral part of traditional Assamese cuisine. Fermented bamboo shoot, called khorisa, is a widely used ingredient in Assamese recipes for meats such as pork, chicken, duck and squab or pigeon. Fermentation increases the nutritional value of bamboo shoots by making some nutrients more bioavailable and degrading toxins.

In Karnataka, Andhra Pradesh, and Northern Tamil Nadu, the bamboo shoots are used as a special dish during the monsoons (due to seasonal availability). It is common in Tulunadu and Malnad regions. It goes by the name kanile or 'kalale in Tulu, veduru kommulu in Telugu, and moongil kuruthu in Tamil. The shoots are usually sliced and soaked in water for two to three days, after which the water is drained and replenished each day to extract and remove toxins. It is also used as a pickle.

In the Diyun region of Arunachal Pradesh, the Chakma people call them bashchuri. The fermented version is called medukkeye and is often served fried with pork. The bamboo shoots can also be fermented and stored with vinegar.

In Jharkhand, India, the bamboo shoots are used as a vegetable. Young shoots and stored shoots are known as karil and shandhna respectively.

In the western part of Odisha, India, they are known as karadi and are used in traditional curries such as ambila, pithou bhaja and pickle. In monsoon, it can be abundantly found in the bamboo forests of the Karlapat wildlife sanctuary and mostly prepared in homes using mustard paste. They can be stored for months in an airtight container. They are also dried in the sun, increasing their shelf life; these dried shoots are called hendua. The dried shoots are used in curries of roasted fish, called poda macha.

In Nagaland, India, bamboo shoots are both cooked and eaten as a fresh food item or fermented for a variety of culinary uses. Fermented bamboo shoot is commonly known as bas tenga. Cooking pork with a generous portion of fermented bamboo shoot is very popular in Naga cuisine.

In Manipur, India, they are known as u-soi. They are also fermented and preserved after which they are known as soibum. They are used in a wide variety of dishes – among which are iromba, ooti and kangshu etc. The fermented bamboo shoots which is preserved for many months is known as soijin.

In Meghalaya, bamboo shoots are either used fresh or fermented and made into pickles, soups with pork or dried fish, or curried and seasoned with sesame seeds or made into a sauce with fermented fish. They are sometimes cooked along with yam leaves and dried fish.

In Chittagong Hill Tracts, Bangladesh, bamboo shoots are a traditional food of the indigenous Jumma people. The preparation of their dishes consist of several steps. First, bamboo shoots are collected from the bamboo forest then defoliated and boiled in water. Afterwards, the bamboo shoot is prepared with shrimp paste, chili, garlic paste, and salt.

==== Southeast Asia ====
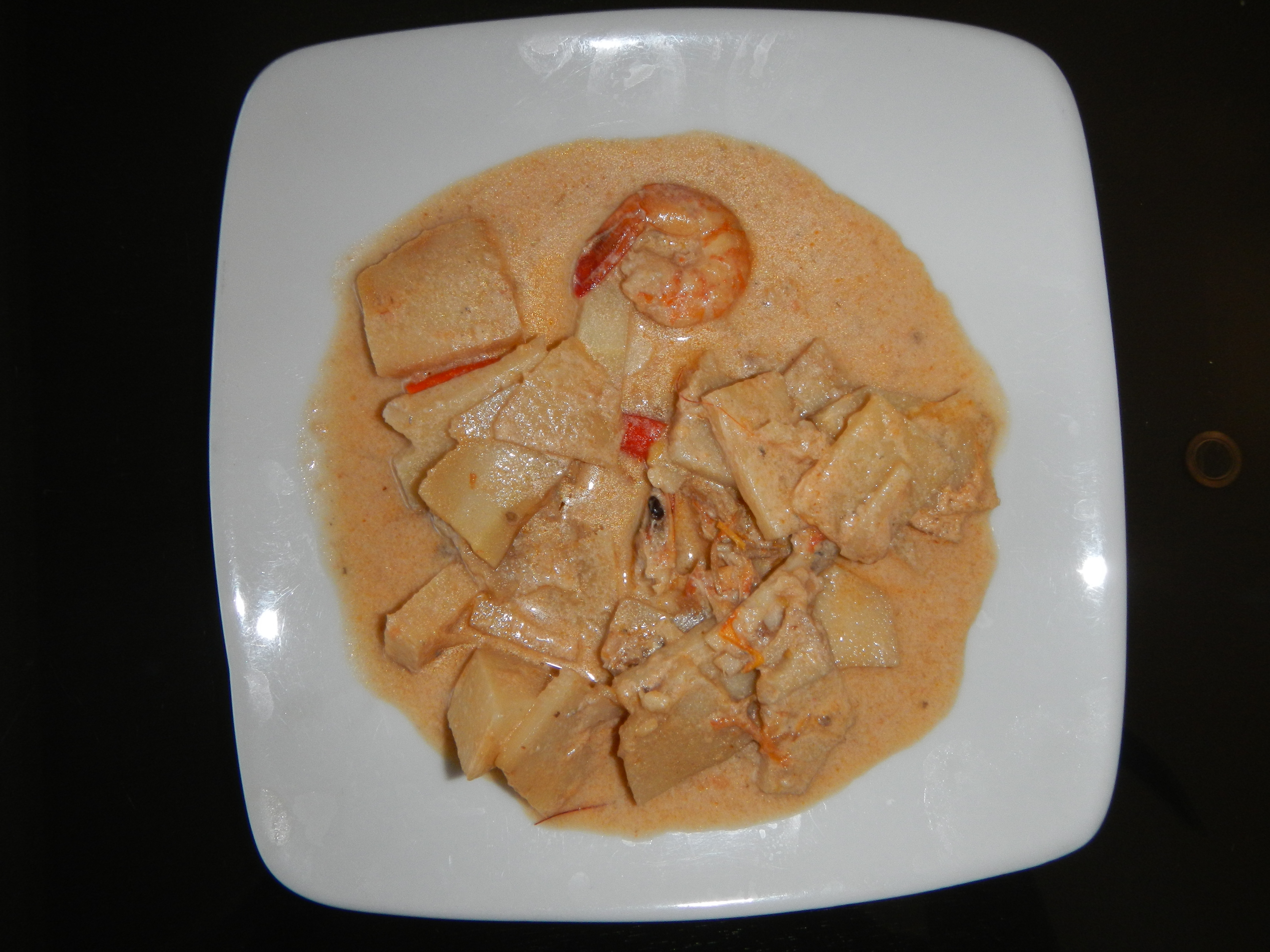
Filipino ginataáng labóng, bamboo shoots cooked in coconut milk

In the Philippines, bamboo shoots are primarily harvested from bolo bamboo (Gigantochloa levis), giant bamboo (Dendrocalamus asper), common bamboo (Bambusa vulgaris), spiny bamboo (Bambusa blumeana), and two endemic species, bayog (Bambusa merrilliana) and laak (Bambusa philippinensis). Other economically important species also harvested for bamboo shoots include kayali (Gigantochloa atter), male bamboo (Dendrocalamus strictus), and climbing bamboos (Dinochloa spp.) Another endemic species, the lumampao or bagakay bamboo (Schizostachyum lumampao), which are used for making sawali (woven bamboo strips), are also occasionally harvested for bamboo shoots. In Filipino cuisine, the shoots are commonly called labóng (other names include rabong, dabong, or tambo). The two most popular dishes for these are ginataáng labóng (shoots in coconut milk and chilies) and dinengdeng na labóng (shoots in fish bagoóng and stew of string beans, saluyot, and tinapa). They are also sautéed alone or with other ingredients as in paklay, or cooked as fried or fresh lumpia. Bamboo shoots are also preserved as atchara, traditional sweet pickles that are often made from papaya.

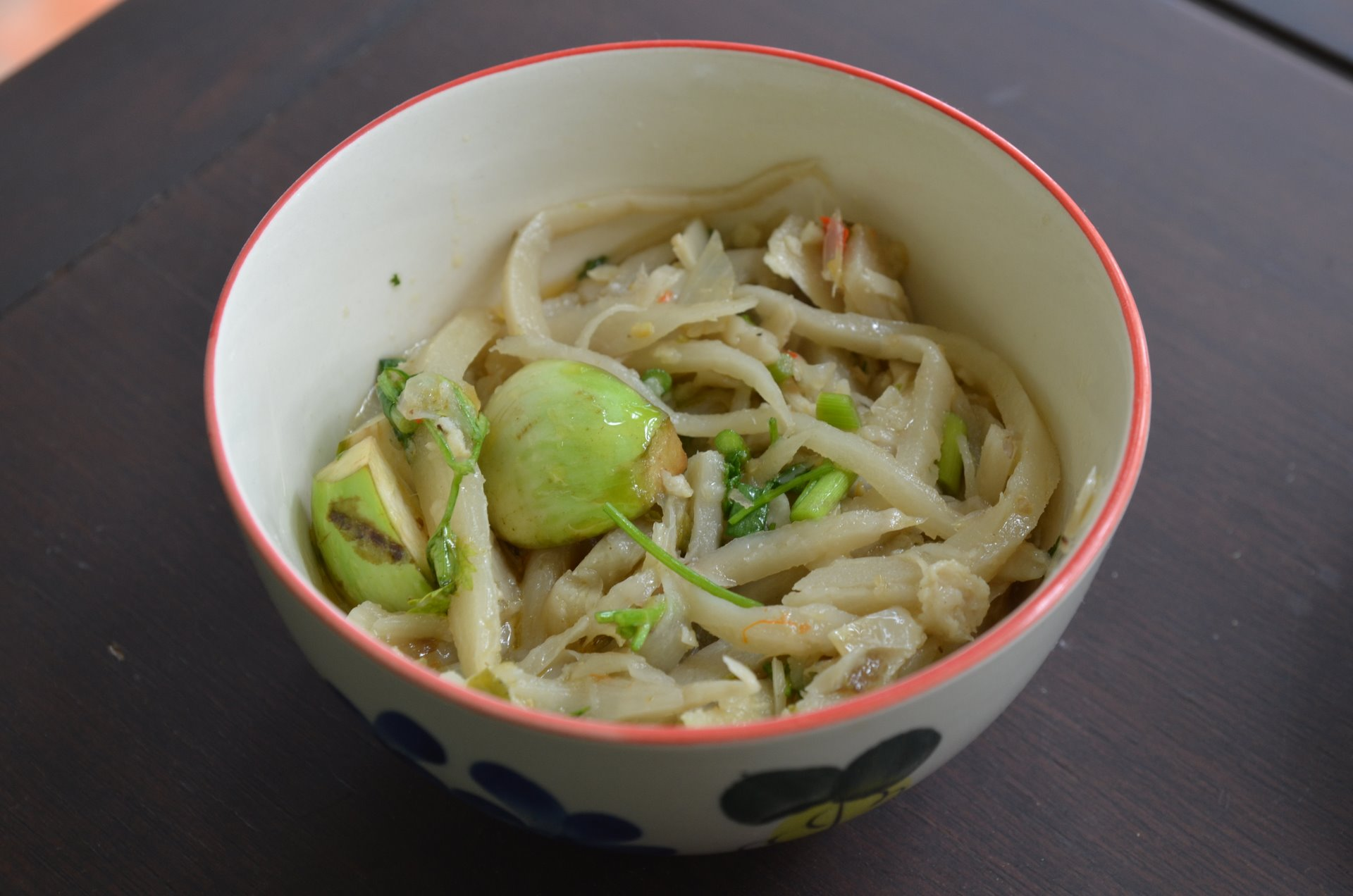
Yam no mai, a northern Thai salad made with boiled bamboo shoots

In Thai cuisine bamboo shoots are called no mai. It can be used in stir-fries, soups such as tom kha kai, curries such as kaeng tai pla, as well as in salads such as sup no-mai. Some dishes ask for fresh bamboo shoots, others for pickled bamboo shoots (no mai dong).

In Vietnamese cuisine, shredded bamboo shoots are used alone or with other vegetable in many stir-fried vegetable dishes. It may also be used as the sole vegetable ingredient in pork chop soup. Duck and bamboo shoot noodles (Bún măng vịt) is also a famous noodle dish in Vietnam.

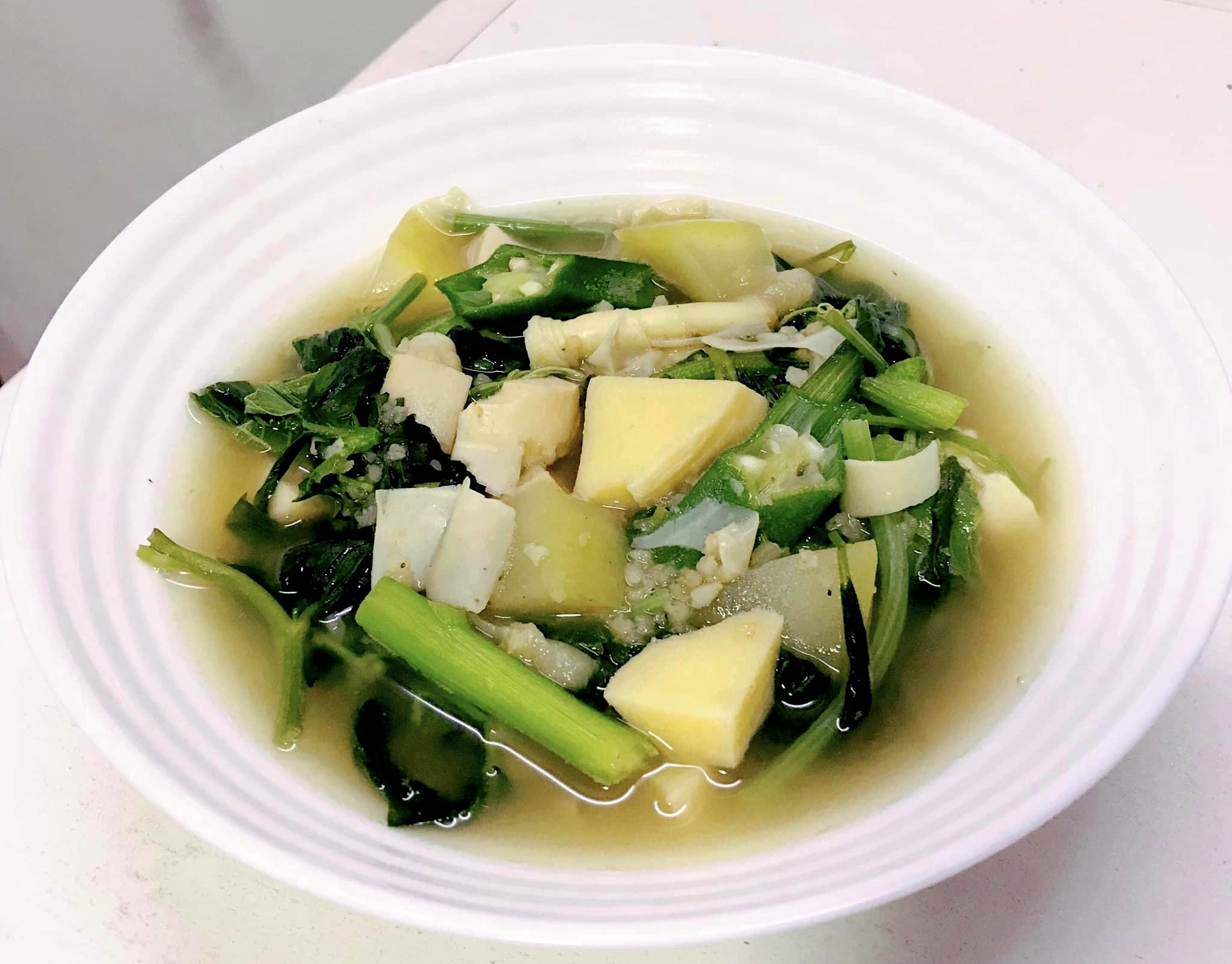
Talabaw of the Karen people of Myanmar

In Myanmar, bamboo shoots are called hmyit (Burmese: မျှစ်). They can be used in a soup called myahait hcaut tar la bot or talabaw, bamboo soup. The preparation of this dish generally follows three steps. First, the bamboo shoots are collected from a bamboo forest. Bamboo can be found in the whole of Myanmar but the bamboo shoots from the two northernmost regions (Kachin State and Sagaing Region) are soft and good in taste. The bamboo shoots are then boiled in water after which they can be cooked with curry powder, rice powder, and other ingredients such as snakehead fish and basil leaves. A small amount of rice and some shreds of meat or seafood may also be added. The soup was traditionally used by the Karen people as a supplement to rice, which was not readily or cheaply available to them. Talabaw is one of the most well known soups in Myanmar, and widely considered to be the essential dish of Karen cuisine. Another bamboo shoot dish in Burmese cuisine is a sour bamboo shoot curry called hmyit chin hin (မျှစ်ချဉ်ဟင်း), a specialty of Naypyidaw in central Burma.

In Indonesia, they are sliced thinly to be boiled with coconut milk and spices to make gulai rebung. Other recipes using bamboo shoots are sayur lodeh (mixed vegetables in coconut milk) and lun pia (sometimes written lumpia: fried wrapped bamboo shoots with vegetables). The shoots of some species contain cyanide that must be leached or boiled out before they can be eaten safely. Slicing the bamboo shoots thinly assists in this leaching.

==== Ethiopia ====
Bamboo shoots are also eaten in Ethiopia. The locations where bamboo grows are not contiguous. Bamboo shoots of O. abyssinica are eaten in lowland locations of Pawe, Assosa and Bambasi districts of Benishangul Gumuz Regional State and in Sinan Wereda of Amhara Regional State.

Bamboo shoots of A. alpina are also eaten in higher elevations, including from two bamboo forests about 80 km. apart, both areas at higher elevations than the surrounding land. One is on a mountain south of Mizan Teferi, the other is on the higher elevations near Maasha, between the cities of Tepi and Gore.

== Gallery ==
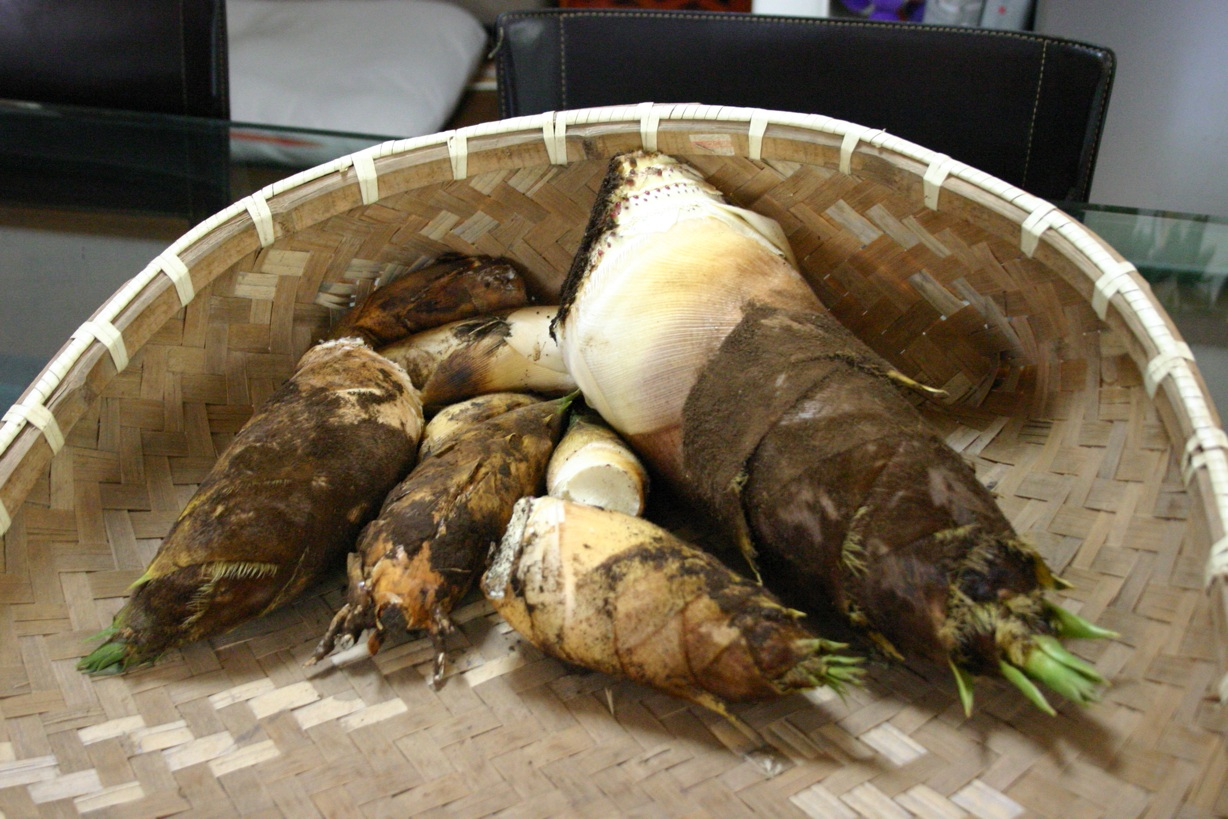
Whole bamboo shoots after being harvested

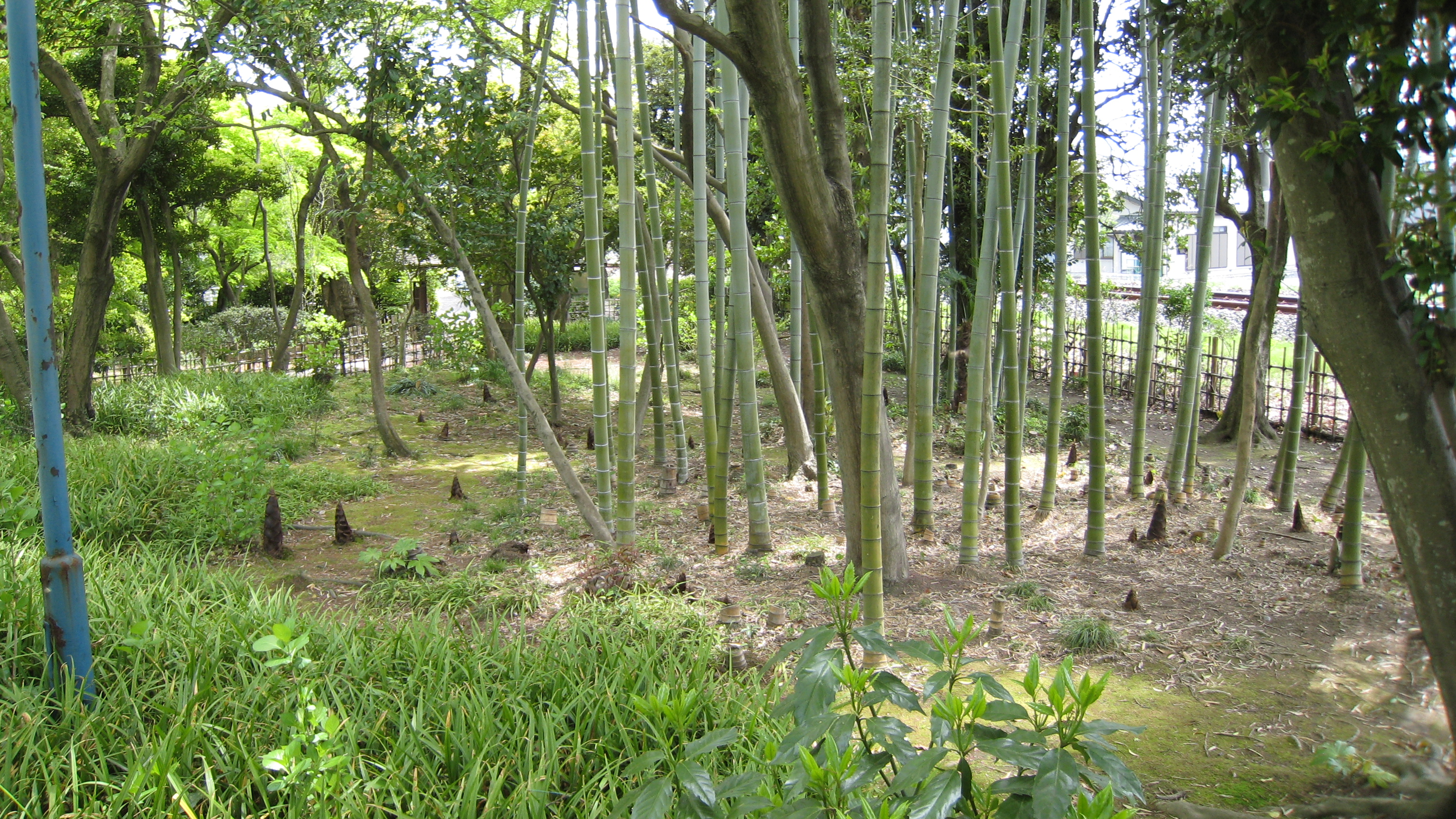
Shoots of bamboo, emerging from the ground

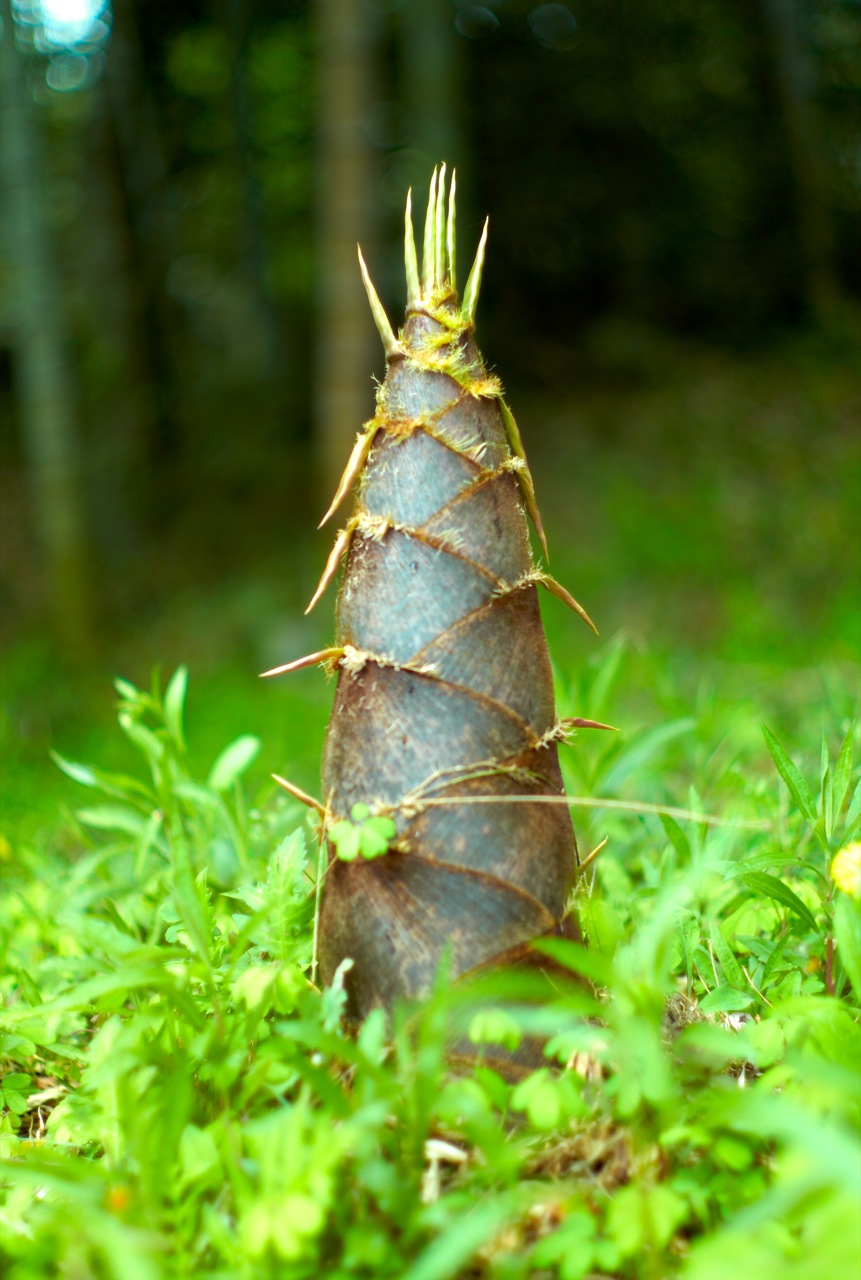
Bamboo shoot, already too old to be eaten

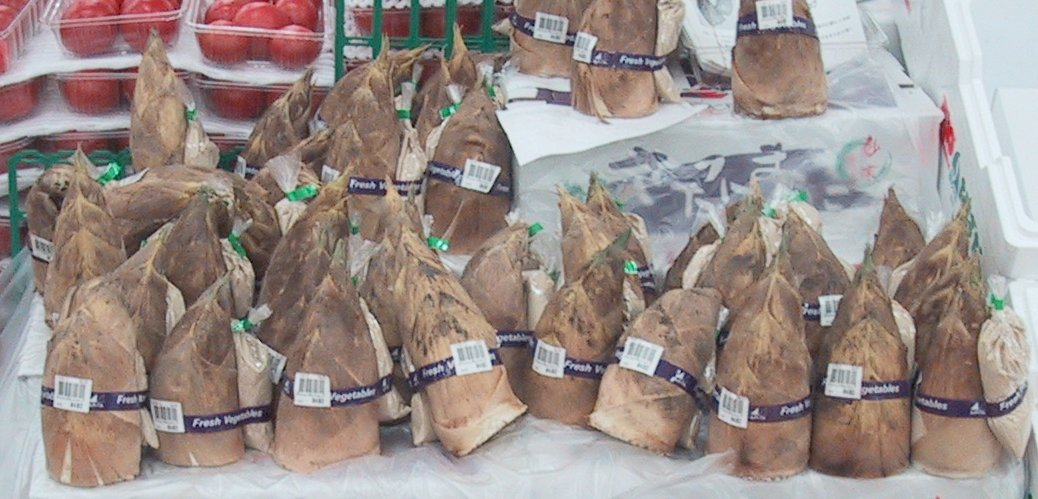
Bamboo shoots for sale in a supermarket in Japan

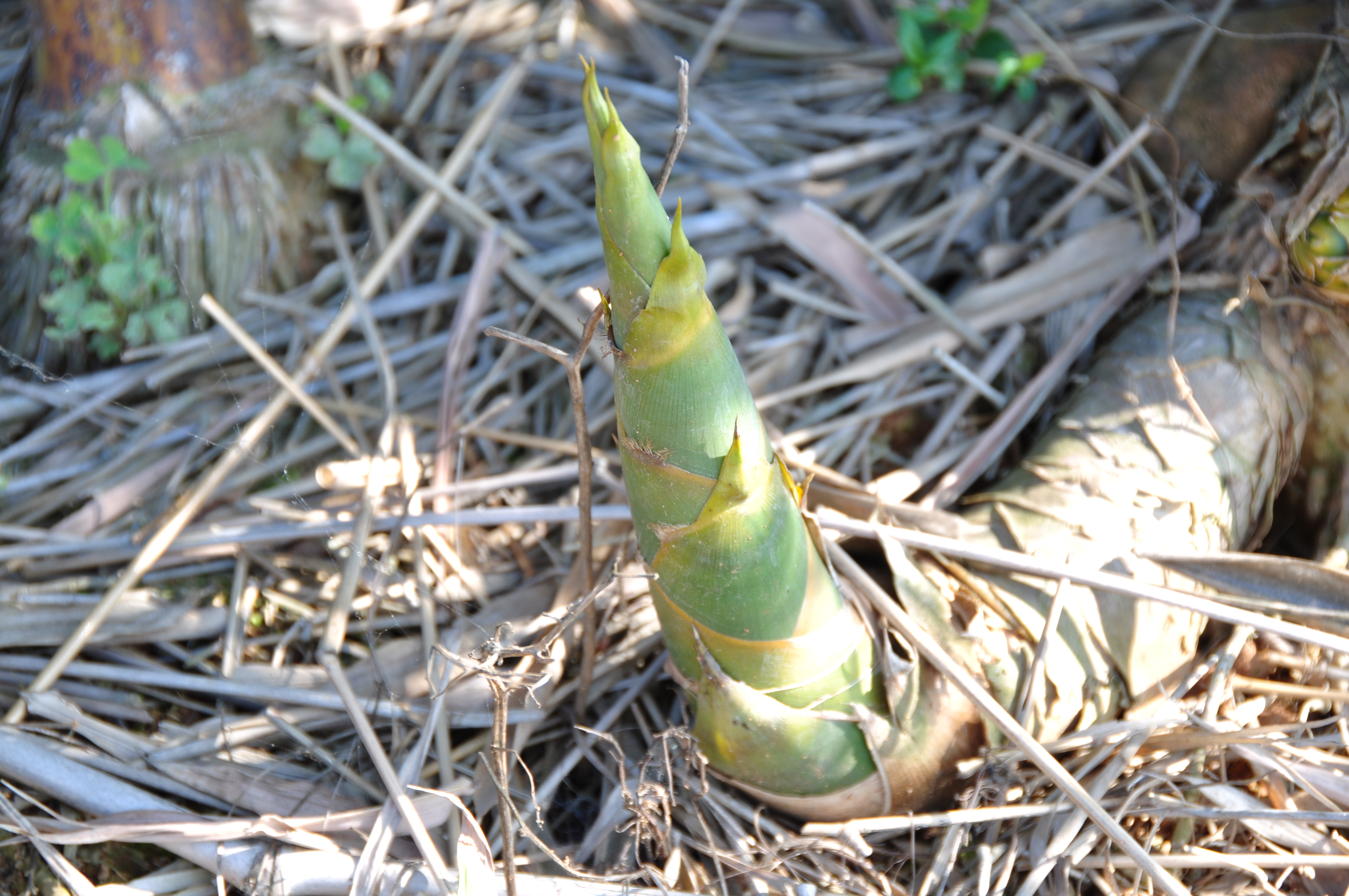
Growth in Taiwan regional low elevation flat land thorn bamboo shoots.

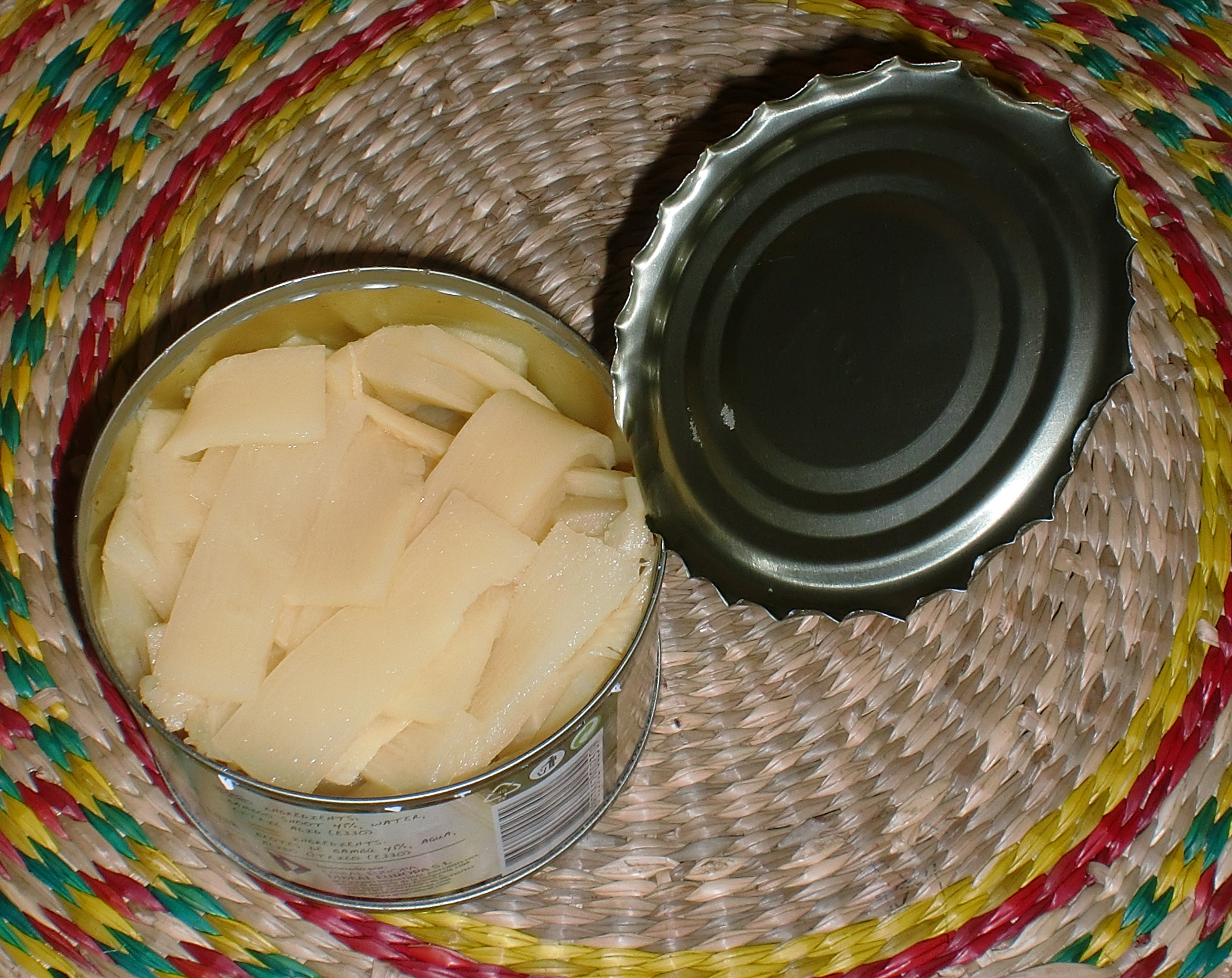
Canned bamboo shoots.

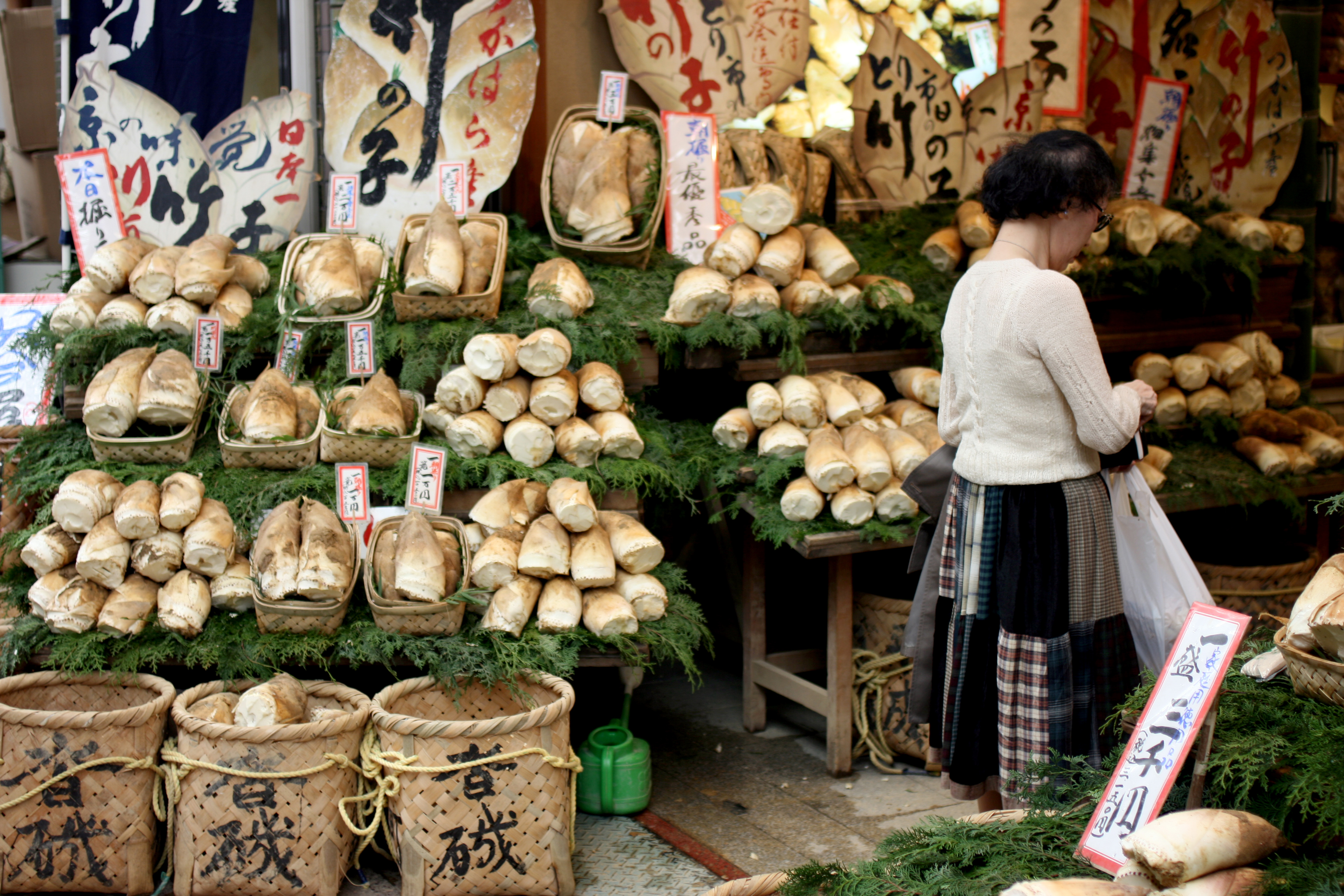
Different types of bamboo shoots in a shop in Japan

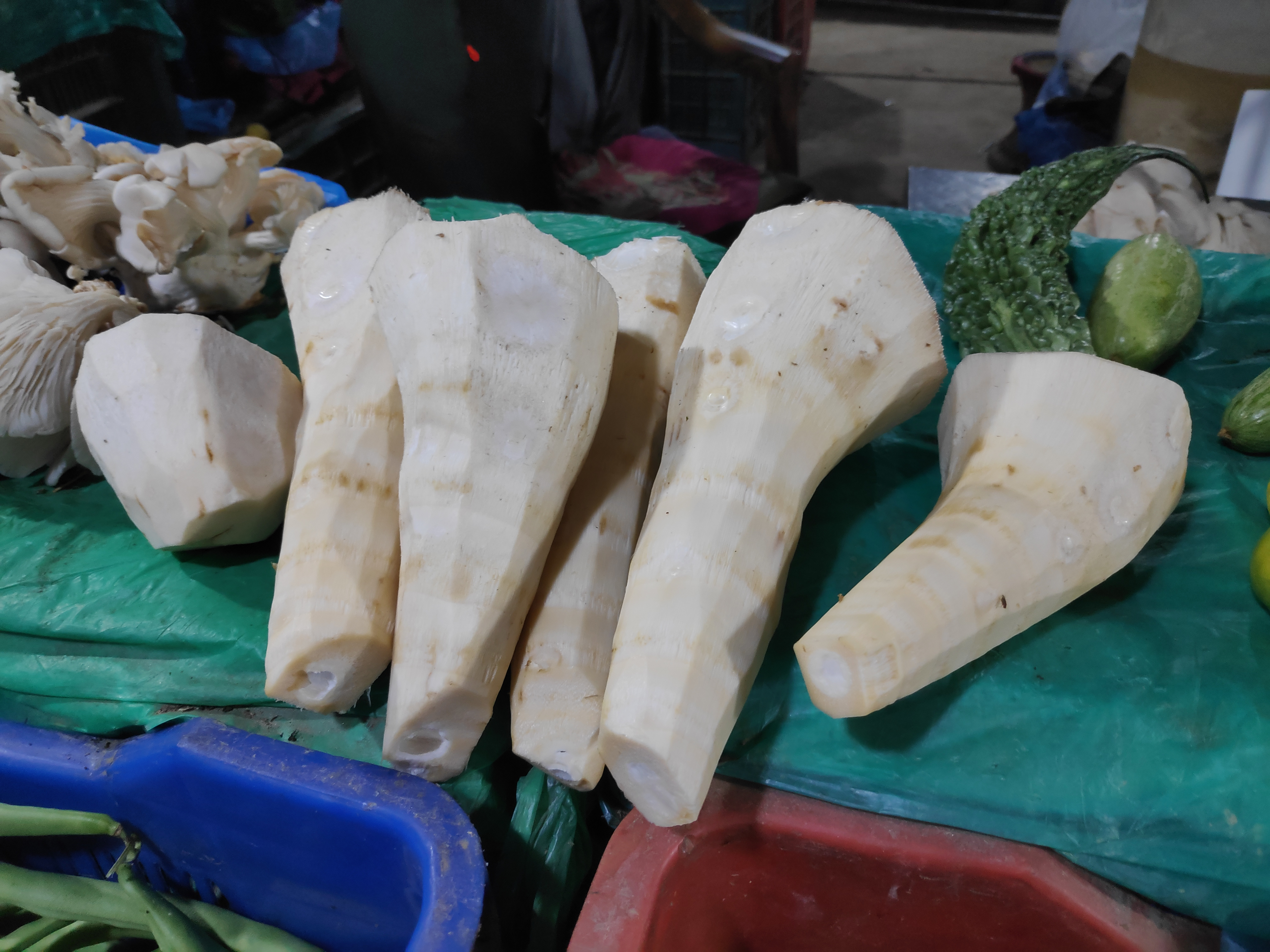
Bamboo shoot for sale in Kathmandu, Nepal.

== See also ==
- Takenoko-zoku
- Umami
