= Giant bamboo =

Giant bamboo is a common name for several large species of bamboo and may refer to:

- Large species in the genus Bambusa include:
  - "Giant timber bamboo" (Bambusa oldhamii), a large (to 20 m) bamboo species originating from Taiwan
  - Bambusa balcooa larger (to 25 m) from Indo-China
- Moso bamboo (Phyllostachys edulis) a commercial species used for timber, crafts and its edible shoots, found in Japan, Taiwan, and China.
- "Madagascar giant bamboo" (Cathariostachys madagascariensis), a bamboo species found in Madagascar
- Species in the genus Dendrocalamus found from the Indian subcontinent throughout Southeast Asia
  - Dendrocalamus giganteus, one of the tallest species of bamboo
- species of the genus Gigantochloa found in tropical Southeast Asia
- species of the genus Guadua concentrated in the Amazon basin and the Orinoco basin

== See also ==
- Bamboo
