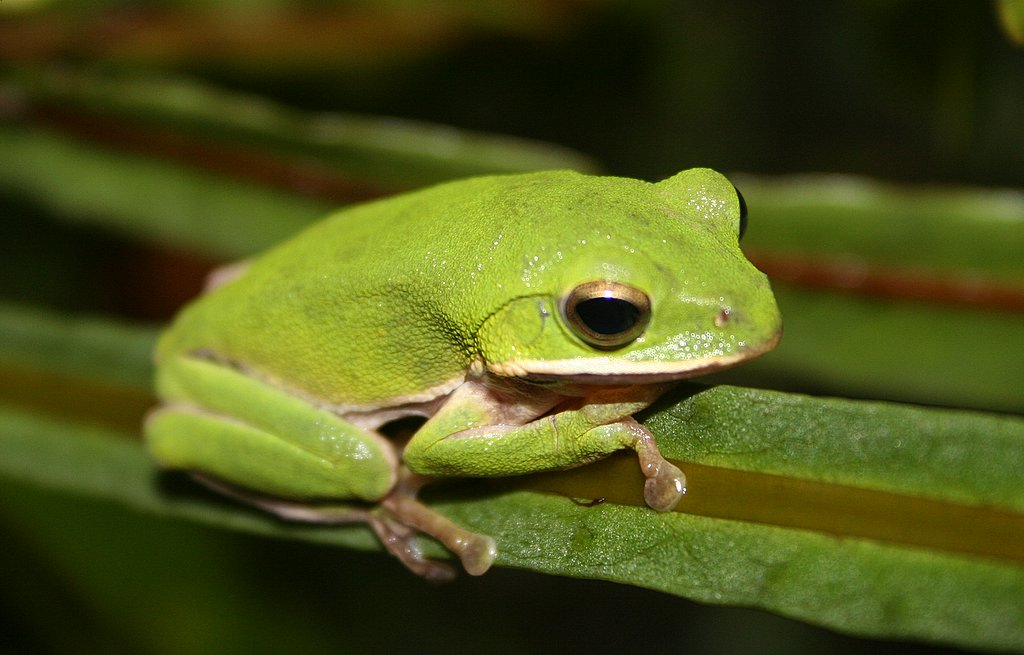

Conservation status
- Endangered (IUCN 3.1)

Scientific classification
- Kingdom: Animalia
- Phylum: Chordata
- Class: Amphibia
- Order: Anura
- Family: Rhacophoridae
- Genus: Zhangixalus
- Species: Z. arvalis

Binomial name
- Zhangixalus arvalis (Lue, Lai, and Chen, 1995)

Synonyms
- Rhacophorus arvalis Lue, Lai, and Chen, 1995

= Zhangixalus arvalis =

Species of frog

Zhangixalus arvalis is a species of frog in the family Rhacophoridae. It is endemic to western and southwestern Taiwan and is present in agricultural areas of Chiayi, Yunlin, and Tainan. Common name farmland green treefrog has been coined for it.

== Description ==
Zhangixalus arvalis is a medium-sized treefrog; adult males measure 39–46 mm (1.5–1.8 in) and adult females 60–64 mm (2.4–2.5 in) in snout–vent length. The tympanum is visible, but it is dorsally and posteriorly concealed by the thin supratympanic fold. The fingers and the toes have well-developed discs and are webbed; webbing is weakly developed between the fingers but more prominent between the toes. Skin is granulated. The dorsum varies from dark green, green, yellowish-green, to nearly yellow. The upper lip is white, and the white color continues as a white stripe on the flanks; flank below the white stripe is dark purple. The lower lip and edge of gular region are silver gray to white.

== Habitat and conservation ==
Zhangixalus arvalis occurs in disturbed lowland (elevations below 1,000 m (3,300 ft)) agricultural areas where traditional farming practices prevails; it inhabits bamboo forests, orchards, sugar-cane fields, scrubland, and cultivated fields. Reproduction involves a lek-type mating system where males form a chorus group on twigs or leaves near canopy. Female selects a male and carries him down to the damp forest floor (usually a temporary pool), digs a hole, lays foamy eggs in the nest, and then covers the nest with decomposed bamboo leaves or other plant material. The development to metamorphosis takes about 40 days.

The population of Zhangixalus arvalis is fragmented. It is threatened by habitat loss caused by infrastructure development for industry and human settlement, and by agricultural pollution. Conservation measures include maintaining traditional agricultural practices. Taiwan Wildlife Conservation Act classifies its as endangered, as does the IUCN Red List of Threatened Species.

== Etymology ==
The name of the genus honors Zhang Ya-Ping from the Chinese Academy of Sciences, in recognition to his contributions to biodiversity and evolution research in China, in combination with ixalus, a common generic root for tree frogs. The specific name arvalus refers to the frog's frequent farmland habitat.

== Cultural Influence ==
- Tainan Main Public Library official mascot
- 2026 National High School Games in Chiayi County, Taiwan, official mascot

== See also ==
- List of protected species in Taiwan
- List of endemic species of Taiwan
- Bambusa oldhamii
