= Bamboo shoot salad =

Lao and Northeastern Thai dish

Bamboo shoot salad (Thai: ซุบหน่อไม้, RTGS: sup nomai, pronounced [súp nɔ̀ː.máːj]; Lao: ຊຸບໜໍ່ໄມ້, pronounced [sūp nɔ̄ː.mâj]; Northeastern Thai: ซุบหน่อไม้, pronounced [sùp nɔ̄ː.ma᷈j]) is a traditional Lao / Northeastern Thai (Isan) dish.

It is a popular dish, often sold alongside somtam in Thailand, and features sour, salty and hot tastes from lime, fish sauce, dried chilli and toasted rice. In addition to bamboo shoots, typical ingredients also include local herbs such as yanang (Tiliacora triandra), lemongrass and phak phaeo (Polygonum odoratum). It is traditionally eaten with warm sticky rice and grilled chicken (kai yang).

In Thailand, considerable confusion exists regarding the name of the dish, as sup, a Lao word describing this kind of spicy salad dish, is a homophone of the loanword for soup. The name of the dish is often misspelled as ซุปหน่อไม้, which would mean "bamboo-shoot soup".
