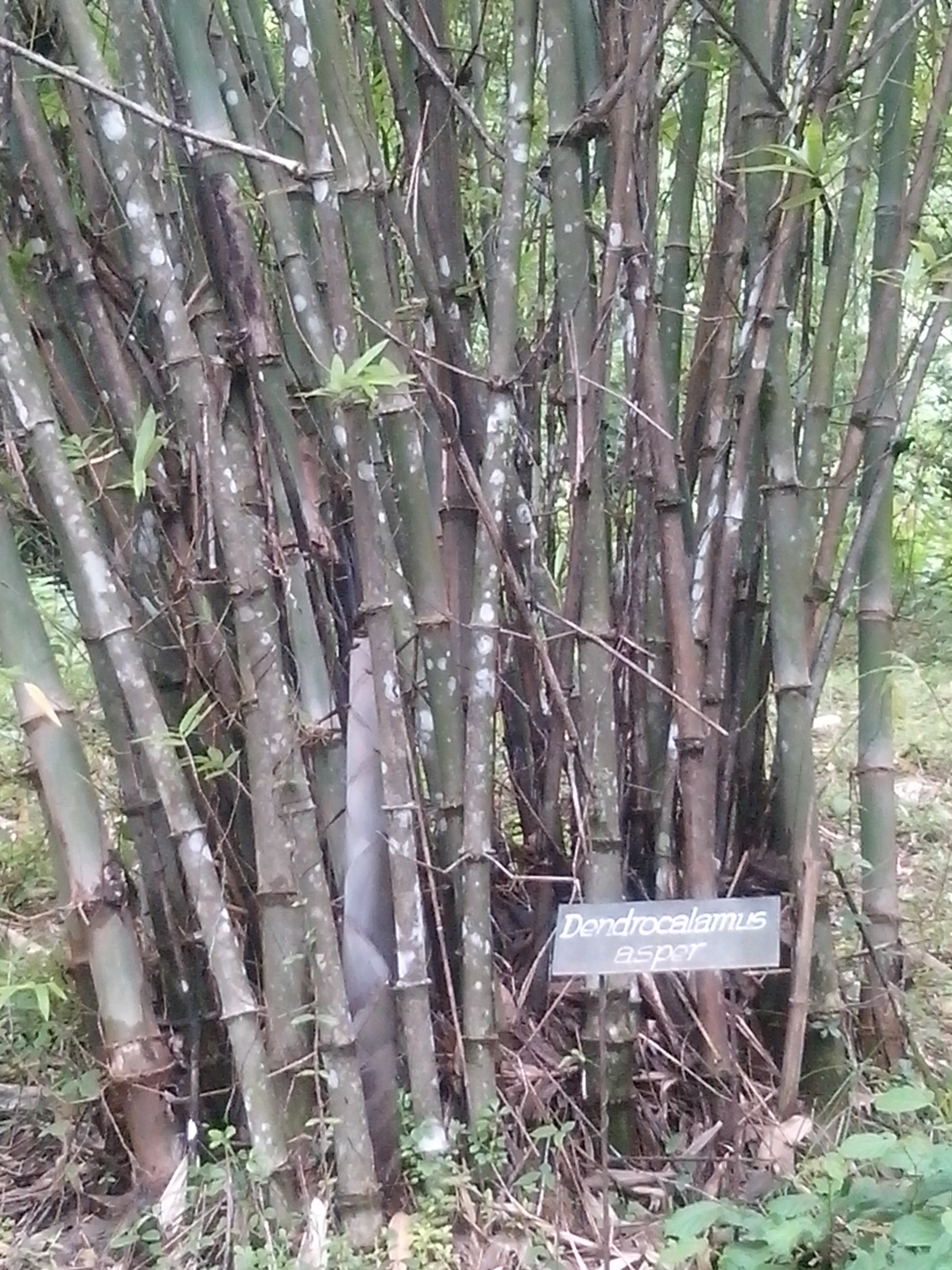
- The bamboo garden of Kerala Forest Research Institute at Palappilli, Thrissur district, Kerala

Scientific classification
- Kingdom: Plantae
- Clade: Tracheophytes
- Clade: Angiosperms
- Clade: Monocots
- Clade: Commelinids
- Order: Poales
- Family: Poaceae
- Genus: Dendrocalamus
- Species: D. asper

Binomial name
- Dendrocalamus asper (Schult.) Backer

= Dendrocalamus asper =

Species of grass

Dendrocalamus asper, also known as giant bamboo or dragon bamboo (in China), is a giant, tropical, clumping species of bamboo native to Southeast Asia. In addition to its prolific nature across Asia, the plant's overall attractive appearance (and ease of care) has seen this species introduced widely across South America and Africa (namely Kenya, Malawi and Ghana), as well as Mexico and Florida. One advantage of this bamboo, especially for gardens, is its natural growth habit as a sympodial, colony-forming plant. Overall this bamboo maintains its own "personal" growing space, and does not grow laterally (runners), thus posing less risk of being environmentally-invasive.

Although D. asper is widely considered to be non-invasive, that is only a generalized experience of most gardeners. Any species of plant can grow one way in its early stages of life, only to then grow very differently in another, especially if relocated. This could be seen as significant growth spurts, or gradually decreasing vigor of the plant. Changes in growth habit can potentially be due to warmer or colder climates, irrigation methods, higher or lower precipitation, chemical exposures, varying soil and substrate types, or just general transplant shock. The majority of individuals planting D. asper praise its neat, mound-forming growth habit, and overall hardiness.

This bamboo species of the genus Dendrocalamus grows 15–20 m tall, and 8–12 cm in diameter. It is found commonly in India, Sri Lanka, Southwest China and Southeast Asia. and more recently in Latin America and warmer regions in the United States.

This timber bamboo has traditionally used as a building material for heavy construction because its culms are large diameter and very straight, and its young shoots are consumed as a vegetable. Along with Moso bamboo in China, Dendrocalamus asper is the most popular bamboo species in Asia whose shoots are used as a source of food.

Culms of Dendrocalamus asper bamboo are greyish green, becoming dull brown on drying. Lower nodes of young culms are covered with golden brown hairs which are the most easily distinguishing factor of the species. Young shoots are brownish black. Internode length is 25–60 cm, diameter 3.5–15 cm. The culm walls are generally very thick but also show great variation in this thickness. The nodes are prominent. The culm sheath is straw-colored and appear large, and broad; the top of the sheath is rounded, and auricles are small. The upper surface is covered with golden brown hairs. The under surface is not hairy. Sheaths fall off early. Mature culms grow very straight with tapering occurring only at the upper level, and the culms show very little branching, making them easier to harvest upon maturity.

This species flowers intermittently, with flowering events occurring at time intervals greater than 60 years. The seed is very fragile and seedlings have a high mortality rate requiring considerable care and controlled environments in their first few weeks of growth.

Although with a wide natural occurrence and having been introduced at small scale to many countries it has only recently been grown under a commercial setting. EcoPlanet Bamboo became the first entity to grow Dendrocalamus asper from seed with the development of a million plant nursery, the largest of its kind, focused on this species. In 2015 EcoPlanet Bamboo became the first entity globally to grow the species commercially in a Public Private Partnership with the Ghana Forestry Commission.
