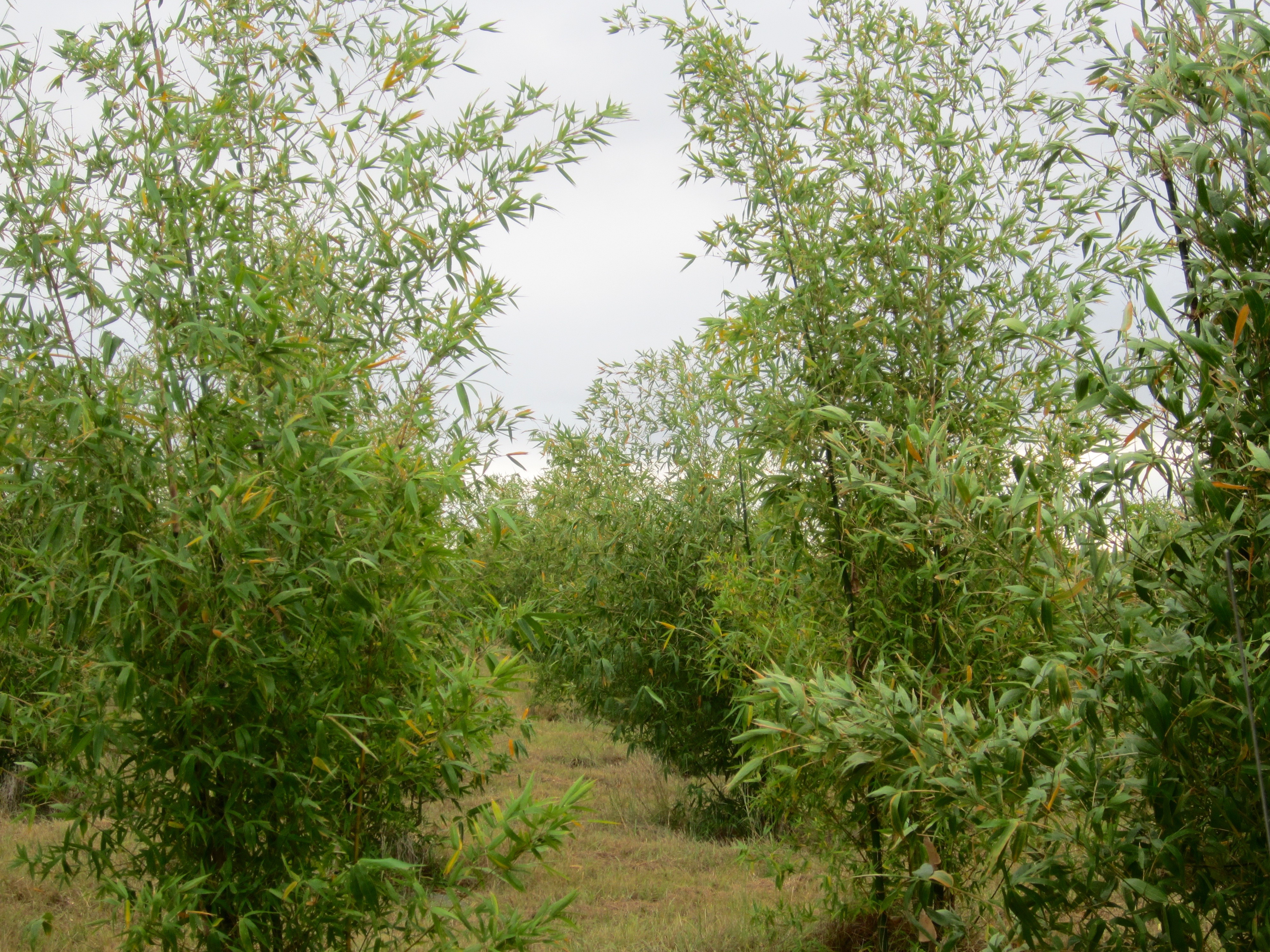

Scientific classification
- Kingdom: Plantae
- Clade: Tracheophytes
- Clade: Angiosperms
- Clade: Monocots
- Clade: Commelinids
- Order: Poales
- Family: Poaceae
- Tribe: Bambuseae
- Subtribe: Bambusinae
- Genus: Bambusa
- Species: B. balcooa

Binomial name
- Bambusa balcooa Roxb.

Synonyms
- Arundarbor balcooa (Roxb.) Kuntze; Bambusa capensis Rupr.; Bambusa vulgaris Nees; Dendrocalamus balcooa Voigt

= Bambusa balcooa =

Species of grass

Bambusa balcooa is a clumping bamboo native from the Indian subcontinent to Indo-China.

== Description ==
Bambusa balcooa is a very large, thick-walled, clumping or sympodial bamboo: (Note: Bamboo can be of either the "clumping" (sympodial) type, or the "running" (monopodial) type. The clumping bamboos, such as those in the genus Bambusa, create new plants by growing new shoots very near the base of existing plants. In contrast, "running" types like those found in the genus Phyllostachys send-out rhizomes several meters before sprouting new shoots. This makes the clumping variety a more efficient user of space as the plant matures and it does not spread out very much. While the running types are generally considered invasive and difficult to confine and maintain; the clumping types like Bambusa balcooa require no effort to contain to a specific area.) growing up to a height of 25 metres (80 feet), and a thickness of 150 millimetres (6 inches).

== Uses ==
The length and strength of Bambusa balcooa make it a useful material for the construction industry. Furthermore, it is a drought-resistant species with low rainfall requirements and can reach yields upwards of 100 metric tons per hectare (40 metric tons per acre).

B. balcooa has recently gained popularity in South Africa as the species of choice for commercial plantations. Although not native to that country, it is the most prominent "giant" bamboo that is accepted as a naturalized species, since its introduction into South Africa during the 1600s. Government tenders were awarded for trials and studies to determine the feasibility of large-scale cultivation of bamboo in South Africa. However, after several years of research on the Bambusa balcooa species by industry leaders such as Camille Rebelo, it was a group called Ecoplanet Bamboo Group that became the first entity to successfully grow the species at commercial scale. More recently, the South African government and other corporations such as ECDC have begun to realize the true economic potential of this giant bamboo in agricultural and forestry sectors.
