= Ecoplanet Bamboo Group =

Winner of the U.S. Department of State's 2014 Award for Corporate Excellence, founded in 2010 by Troy Wiseman and Camille Rebelo, EcoPlanet Bamboo has pioneered the industrialization of bamboo as an alternative fiber for timber manufacturing industries. To date the Company has 37,250 acres of bamboo farms under ownership, in Central American, Western and Southern Africa, with larger scale plantations underway.

EcoPlanet Bamboo is a privately owned United States Company, registered in Delaware and with corporate headquarters located outside of Chicago, Illinois. It is a US Series LLC allowing each geographic region and individual bamboo plantation to be funded and operated separately but under the same umbrella.

The Company has been recognized for its social impact created more than 750 jobs and operates in some of the poorest parts of the world in Nicaragua, South Africa and Ghana.

EcoPlanet Bamboo plants species of tropical clumping (sympodial) bamboos, using only highly degraded and marginal land to produce a tree free, deforestation free fiber. The Company has developed a framework for what sustainability means in respect to bamboo. Farms reach maturity in 5–7 years and the fiber is targeted towards Fortune 500 companies dependent on wood and fiber as their raw resource.

The company is highly decentralized with individual bamboo plantations operating under EcoPlanet Bamboo Groups standardized operational framework to achieve Forest Landscape Restoration. A full set of qualified managerial staff exists on each farm and is overseen by a core managerial team.

== Bamboo in China ==
Although bamboo is a plant that has been grown and harvested in China for generations, it occurs only within a smallholder model. There are few commercial or large scale managed plantations. The majority of area under bamboo comprises plots of a few Mu in size, owned by individual farmers or families, and managed as part of a diverse mix of livelihood crops. Throughout China bamboo has been planted only in areas not suitable for agriculture, which generally mean mountainous land that is often inaccessible. Most of China's bamboo industry is focused on a single iconic species – Moso (Phyllostachys edulis)

The processing of bamboo in China is dominated by low and medium level processing, with a large focus on two very different markets (1) the global handicraft industry and (2) the production of edible bamboo shoots for the food industry. In recent years there has been an increase in the production of bamboo flooring.

EcoPlanet Bamboo is working in a different manner growing certified bamboo fiber for the pulp and paper industry, textiles and engineered timber.

== Historical barriers to industrialization ==
EcoPlanet Bamboo claims to have overcome many barriers to industrialize bamboo as a commercial crop:

1. A lack of planting material. See “bamboo mass flowering".
2. Lack of knowledge on the growth, ecology and yields of bamboos other than Moso.
3. High investment required to take bamboo through the 6–7 years required to reach maturity.
4. Difficulty of operating in remote parts of the developing world.

== Bamboo sustainability ==
EcoPlanet Bamboo is a triple bottom line company promoting the concept of conscious capitalism. The company has pioneered the concept of sustainability certification for commercially produced bamboo. Nicaraguan farms are certified under the Forest Stewardship Council (FSC), the Verified Carbon Standard (VCS) and have gold level Climate Community Biodiversity Alliance (CCBA) stamp of approval. EcoPlanet Bamboo is the first entity to have received these certifications for application to bamboo.

The Company has been insured by the World Bank's Multilateral Insurance Guarantee Agency (MIGA), holding a $48 million policy. MIGA has featured EcoPlanet Bamboo for strong social and environmental impact.

EcoPlanet Bamboo's farms are examples of private sector forest landscape restoration, with planted bamboo conserving and reconnecting remnant forest patches and scattered native vegetation, restoring soil functioning, water tables and carbon sinks.

== US Department of State ACE Award ==
This annual award was presented to EcoPlanet Bamboo by Secretary Kerry at the US State Department in 2014. EcoPlanet Bamboo was honored alongside the Coca Cola company for trendsetting good business practices in its countries of operation.
