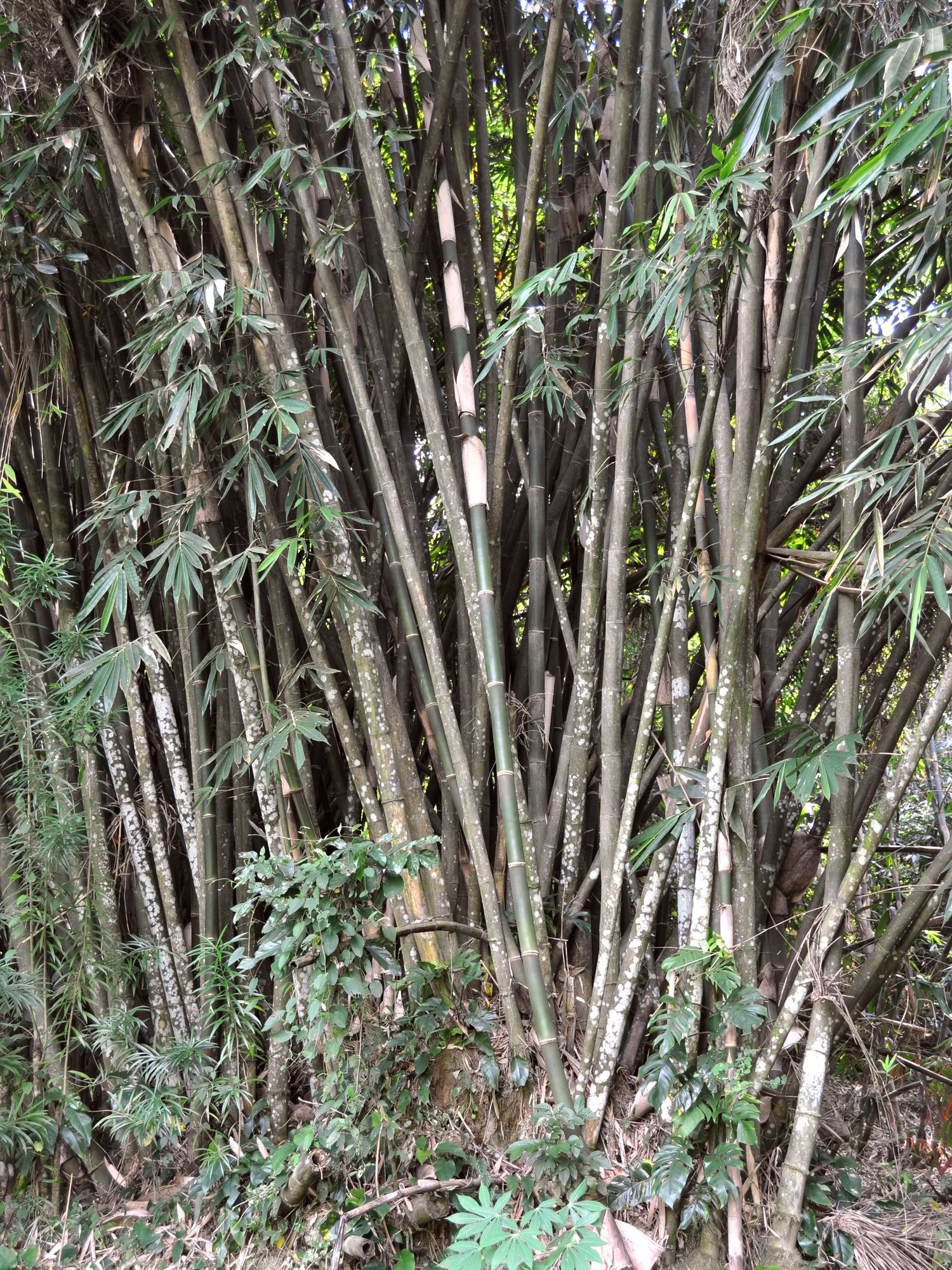

Scientific classification
- Kingdom: Plantae
- Clade: Tracheophytes
- Clade: Angiosperms
- Clade: Monocots
- Clade: Commelinids
- Order: Poales
- Family: Poaceae
- Genus: Gigantochloa
- Species: G. atter

Binomial name
- Gigantochloa atter (Hassk.) Kurz

Synonyms
- Bambusa atter Kurz [Invalid]; Bambusa thouarsii var. atter Hassk.

= Gigantochloa atter =

Black bamboo

Species of grass

Gigantochloa atter, also known as black bamboo, sweet bamboo, or giant atter, is a bamboo species belonging to the genus Gigantochloa. It grows up to 20 meters tall. It is native to Island Southeast Asia, but has become naturalized all over South Asia.

== Appearance ==
The culm is green with purple patches when young, which becomes purplish black when mature, and turns greyish purple when drying. The surface is smooth and glossy. Young shoots are purplish pink in color with green blades on culm sheaths. The culm is straight. Branching occurs only at the top. Internode length is 45–60 cm, and diameter is 5–10 cm.

Culm sheath is purplish pink with green blades in young plants, and turns dark brown when mature. It is triangular with a conical blade. Length of the sheath proper is 24–27 cm in length and 40–45 cm wide. Blade length is 4–7 cm. Auricles absent. Upper surface of the sheath covered with black hairs. Lower surface of the sheath is not hairy. Sheaths fall off early.
