= Tainan Main Public Library =

Public library in Tainan, Taiwan

- 臺南市立圖書館
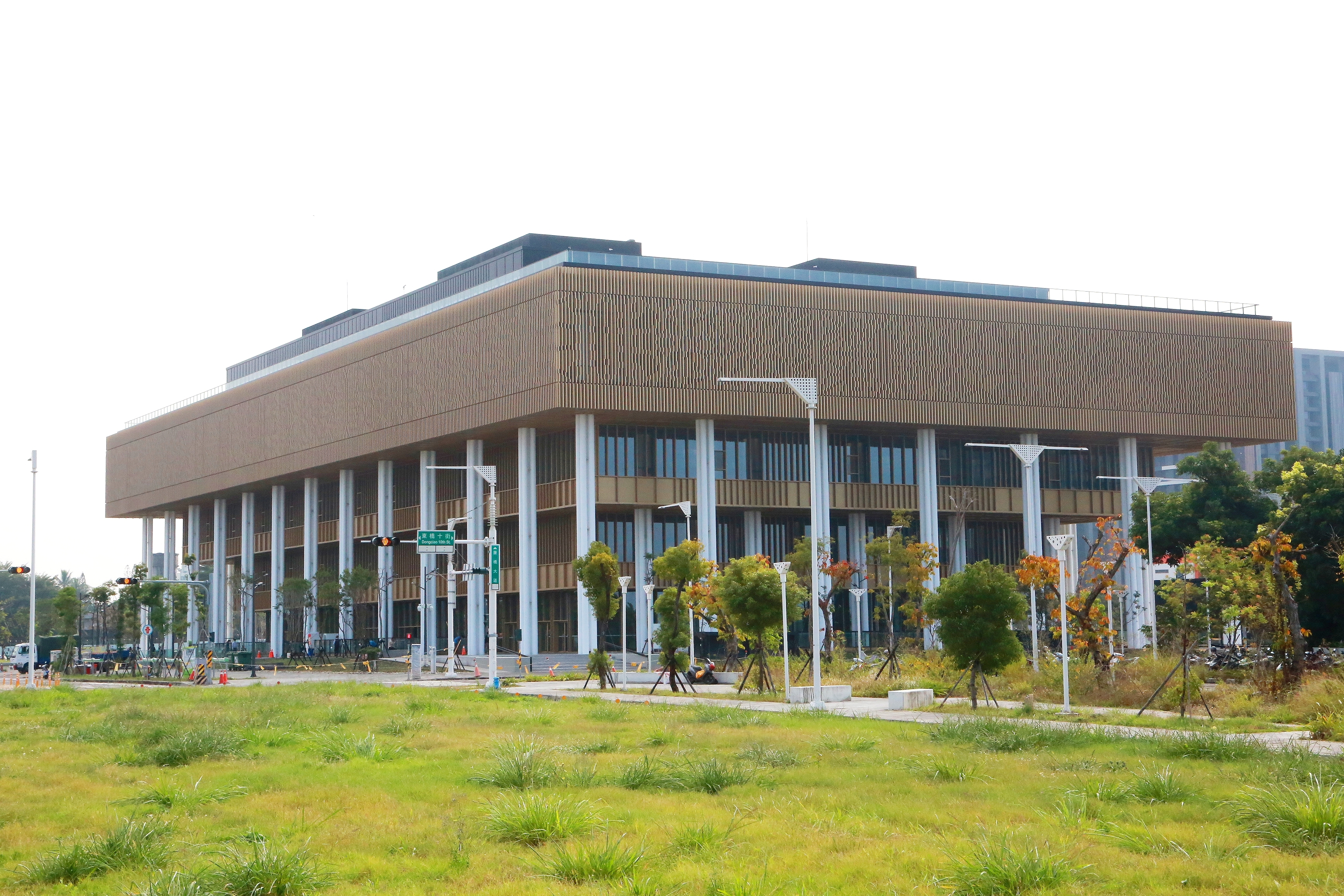
- 23°01′28.52″N 120°14′15.72″E
- Location: Tainan, Taiwan
- Established: 2021 (current main library)
- Branches: 39

Other information
- Director: Fu-ling Yang
- Website: www.tnpl.tn.edu.tw

The Tainan Main Public Library (Chinese: 臺南市立圖書館; pinyin: Táinán Shìlì Túshūguǎn) is the central library of Tainan, Taiwan. It is the main library of the Tainan Public Library System and opened in 2021. The building is located in Kangqiao Boulevard, Yongkang District.

== History ==
The Tainan Public Library system was founded on 13 September 1919, during the period of Japanese rule, as an affiliated library of the Tainan Public Hall (台南公館), making it one of the oldest public library systems in Taiwan. In 1924 it became a municipal library. The original building was located at the northwest corner of Wu Garden before relocating to Park North Road in 1975, where it continues to operate as the Tainan Public Library (Park Branch).2

The Tainan City Government launched a design competition for a new main library building. The commission was won by Dutch firm Mecanoo in partnership with Taiwan's MAYU Architects. The new building, constructed on the site of the former Yongkang Gun School, opened in January 2021.13

== Architecture ==
The library was designed by Dutch firm Mecanoo and Taiwan's MAYU Architects. The building comprises six above-ground floors and two basement levels, with a total floor area of approximately 37,000 square metres.3

The design takes inspiration from Tainan's local culture and tropical climate. The most distinctive feature is the building's inverted stepped form, with cantilevers supported by slender columns arranged in groups of four — a motif described by the architects as evoking a walk through a bamboo forest. The upper portion of the building is wrapped in a skin of vertical aluminium slats, which filter natural light and are patterned with carved floral motifs referencing the decorative lattice windows of the old city. This aluminium crown provides shade for the transparent stepped façade below and creates a large covered outdoor area at ground level.34

== Collections and facilities ==
The library houses approximately 600,000 books, including around 16,000 volumes from the period of Japanese occupation.2 Facilities include:

- Collections for children and young people
- A media library with film-viewing facilities
- Exhibition spaces for modern art and the heritage collection
- A 24-hour study room
- A theatre and conference rooms
- A café
- Staff offices3

== Library system ==
The Tainan Public Library System consists of the main library, 39 branch libraries, and additional cultural centre libraries, totalling 45 public libraries across Tainan, plus two mobile library services.2

== Architecture ==
The library building was designed by Dutch firm Mecanoo and Taiwan's MAYU architects. It comprises 6 above-ground floors and two below. The building houses approximately 600,000 books, with around 16,000 of them from the period of Japanese occupation.

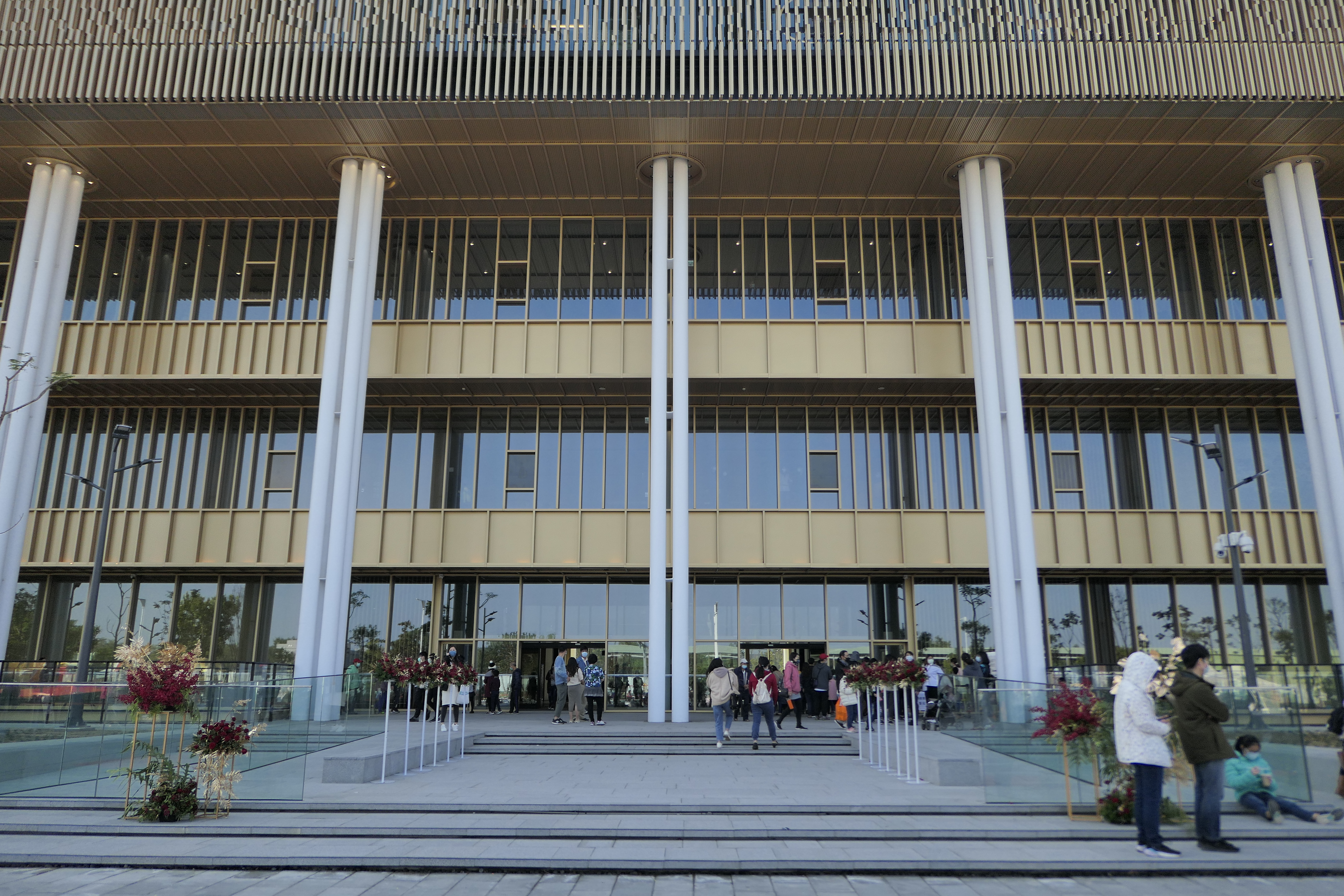
Main entrance

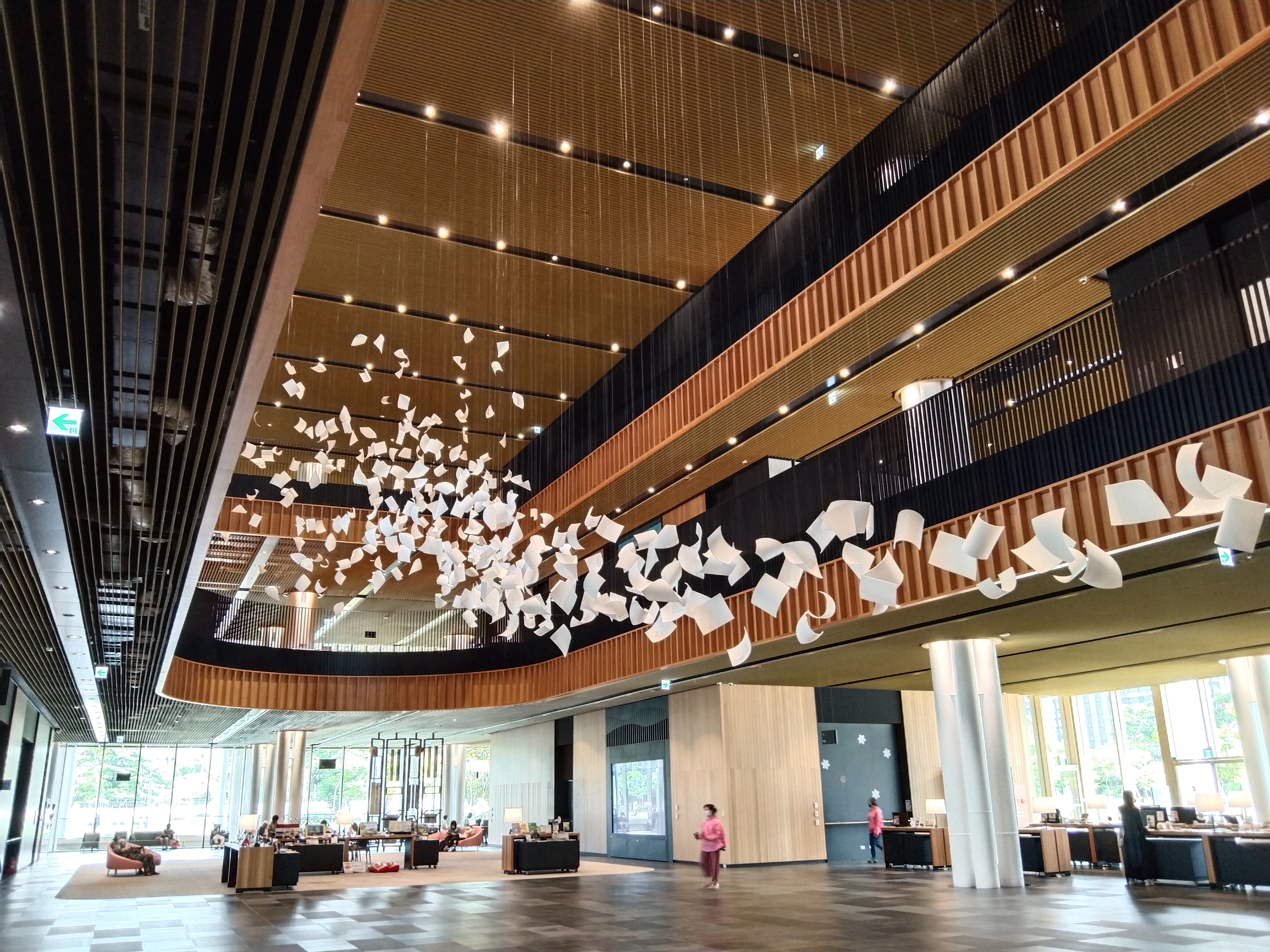
1F Lobby

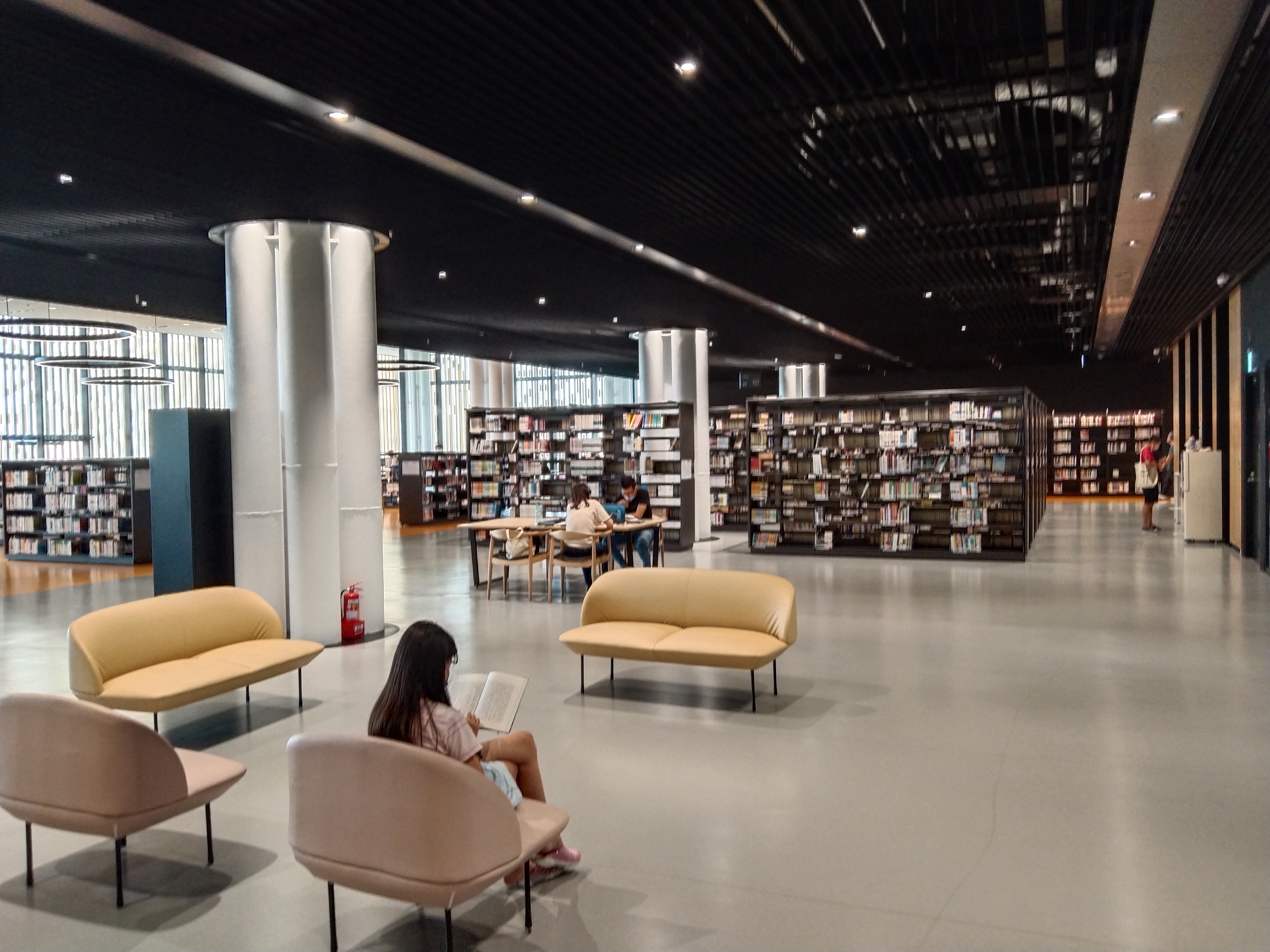
4th floor
