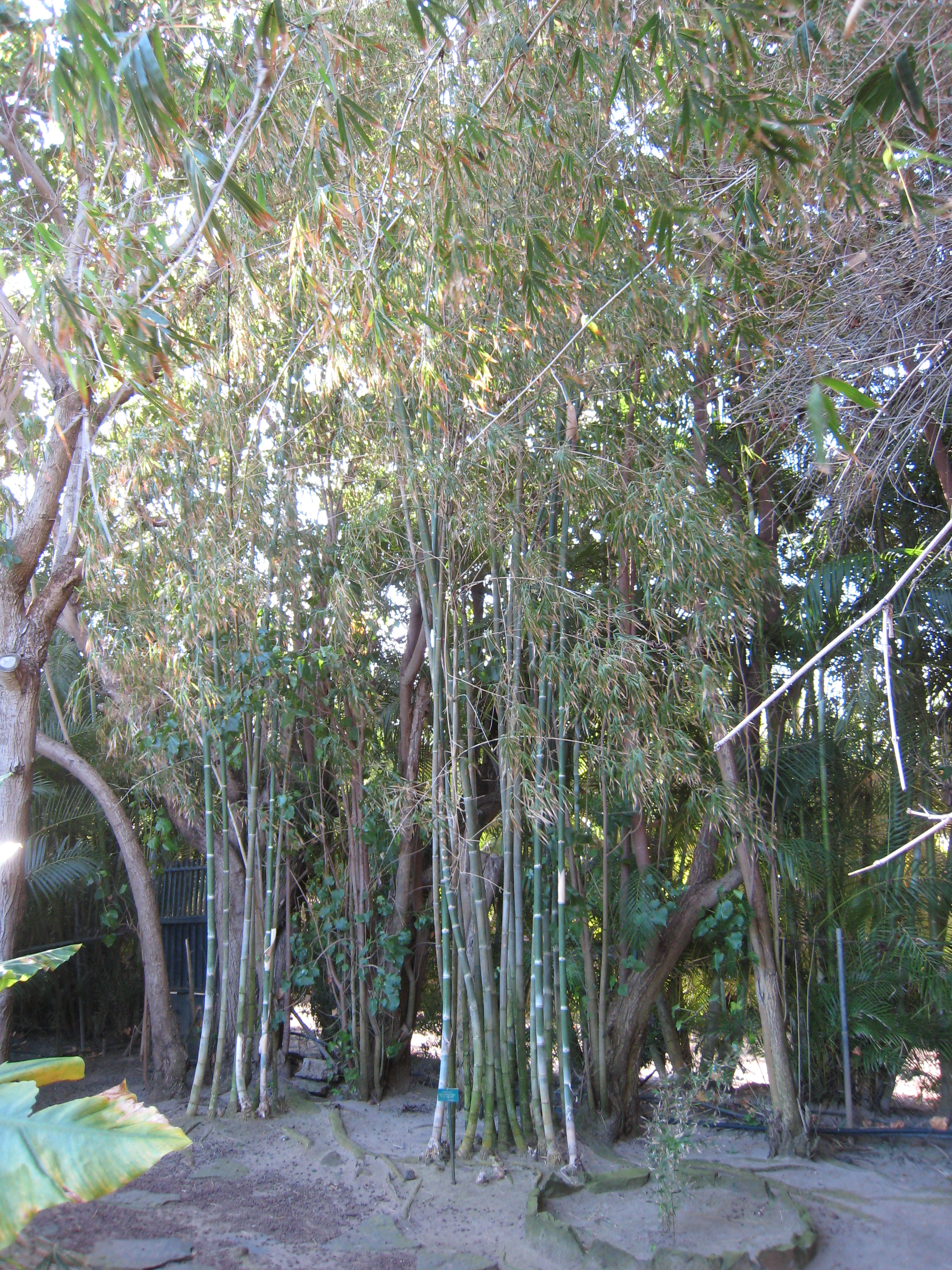
- Gigantochloa albociliata

Scientific classification
- Kingdom: Plantae
- Clade: Embryophytes
- Clade: Tracheophytes
- Clade: Angiosperms
- Clade: Monocots
- Clade: Commelinids
- Order: Poales
- Family: Poaceae
- Subfamily: Bambusoideae
- Tribe: Bambuseae
- Subtribe: Bambusinae
- Genus: Gigantochloa; Kurz ex Munro

Type species
- Gigantochloa atter Kurz ex Munro

= Gigantochloa =

Genus of flowering plants

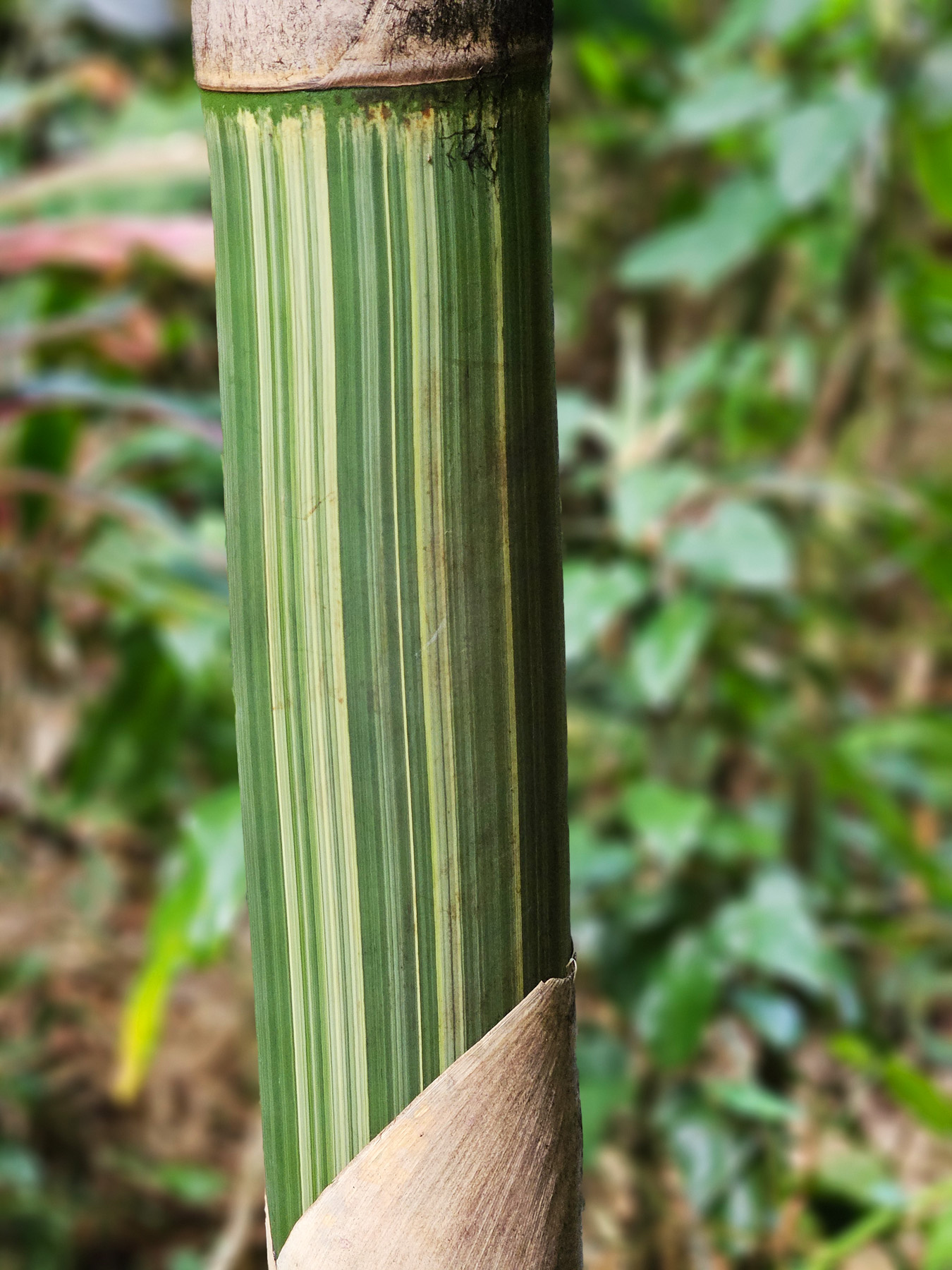
Gigantochloa verticillata

Gigantochloa is a genus of giant clumping bamboos in the grass family Poaceae. Its native range is from India east to southern China and through Southeast Asia to New Guinea.

== Species ==
As of May 2026, Plants of the World Online accepts the following 71 species:

- Gigantochloa achmadii Widjaja
- Gigantochloa albociliata (Munro) Kurz
- Gigantochloa albopilosa K.M.Wong
- Gigantochloa albovestita (Holttum) K.M.Wong
- Gigantochloa andamanica (Kurz) Kurz
- Gigantochloa apus (Schult.f.) Kurz ex Munro
- Gigantochloa arcuta N.H.Xia, Y.Zeng & R.S.Lin
- Gigantochloa atroviolacea Widjaja
- Gigantochloa atter (Hassk.) Kurz ex Munro
- Gigantochloa auriculata (Kurz) Kurz
- Gigantochloa austroyunnanensis N.H.Xia & Y.Zeng
- Gigantochloa aya Widjaja & Astuti
- Gigantochloa baliana Widjaja & Astuti
- Gigantochloa balui K.M.Wong
- Gigantochloa bastareana H.B.Naithani & R.C.Pal
- Gigantochloa brachystachya N.H.Xia & Y.Zeng
- Gigantochloa calcicola Widjaja
- Gigantochloa callosa N.H.Xia, Y.Zeng & R.S.Lin
- Gigantochloa cochinchinensis A.Camus
- Gigantochloa compressa R.Parker
- Gigantochloa dehraduneana H.B.Naithani
- Gigantochloa densa (E.G.Camus) T.Q.Nguyen
- Gigantochloa dinhensis (A.Camus) T.Q.Nguyen
- Gigantochloa felix (Keng) Keng f.
- Gigantochloa gangasinghiana H.B.Naithani, Anup Chandra, R.K.Negi & Ginwal
- Gigantochloa glabrata N.H.Xia & Y.Zeng ex D.Z.Li & Z.C.Xu
- Gigantochloa guptana H.B.Naithani, Anup Chandra & Ginwal
- Gigantochloa hasskarliana (Kurz) Backer ex K.Heyne
- Gigantochloa hayatae (A.Camus) T.Q.Nguyen
- Gigantochloa hirtinoda Widjaja
- Gigantochloa holttumiana K.M.Wong
- Gigantochloa hosseusii (Pilg.) T.Q.Nguyen
- Gigantochloa kuring Widjaja
- Gigantochloa lako (Widjaja) Z.Y.Cai & Widjaja
- Gigantochloa latifolia Ridl.
- Gigantochloa levis (Blanco) Merr.
- Gigantochloa ligulata Gamble
- Gigantochloa longiprophylla Widjaja
- Gigantochloa luteostriata Widjaja
- Gigantochloa macrostachya Kurz
- Gigantochloa magentea Widjaja
- Gigantochloa maneensis Q.M.Qin, N.H.Xia & J.B.Ni
- Gigantochloa manggong Widjaja
- Gigantochloa membranoidea Widjaja
- Gigantochloa multiculmis A.Camus
- Gigantochloa multifloscula H.N.Nguyen, N.H.Xia & V.T.Tran
- Gigantochloa multiradicans N.H.Xia & Y.Zeng
- Gigantochloa nigrociliata (Buse) Kurz
- Gigantochloa pachyparietalis N.H.Xia & Y.Zeng
- Gigantochloa papyracea Widjaja
- Gigantochloa parviflora (Keng f.) Keng f.
- Gigantochloa parvifolia (Brandis ex Gamble) T.Q.Nguyen
- Gigantochloa poilanei (A.Camus) T.Q.Nguyen
- Gigantochloa pruriens Widjaja
- Gigantochloa pubinervis Widjaja
- Gigantochloa pubipetiolata Widjaja
- Gigantochloa ridleyi Holttum
- Gigantochloa robusta Kurz
- Gigantochloa rostrata K.M.Wong
- Gigantochloa scortechinii Gamble
- Gigantochloa serik Widjaja
- Gigantochloa striata N.H.Xia & Y.Zeng
- Gigantochloa taluh Widjaja & Astuti ex Damayanto, Rustiami, Mift. & Chikmaw.
- Gigantochloa tenuispiculata (A.Camus) T.Q.Nguyen
- Gigantochloa thoi K.M.Wong
- Gigantochloa tomentosa Widjaja
- Gigantochloa velutina Widjaja
- Gigantochloa verticillata (Willd.) Munro
- Gigantochloa vietnamica T.Q.Nguyen
- Gigantochloa vinhphuica T.Q.Nguyen
- Gigantochloa wrayi Gamble

In 2026, a new species Gigantochloa falcihumeris was described from China.

Formerly included here

- G. heterostachya – now Bambusa heterostachya
- G. latispiculata – now Bambusa heterostachya
- G. maxima – now Bambusa bambos
- G. merrilliana – now Dendrocalamus merrillianus
- G. novoguineensis – now Neololeba atra
- G. sinuata – now Dendrocalamus sinuatus
- G. stocksii – now Pseudoxytenanthera stocksii
- G. tabindaing – now Bambusa villosula
