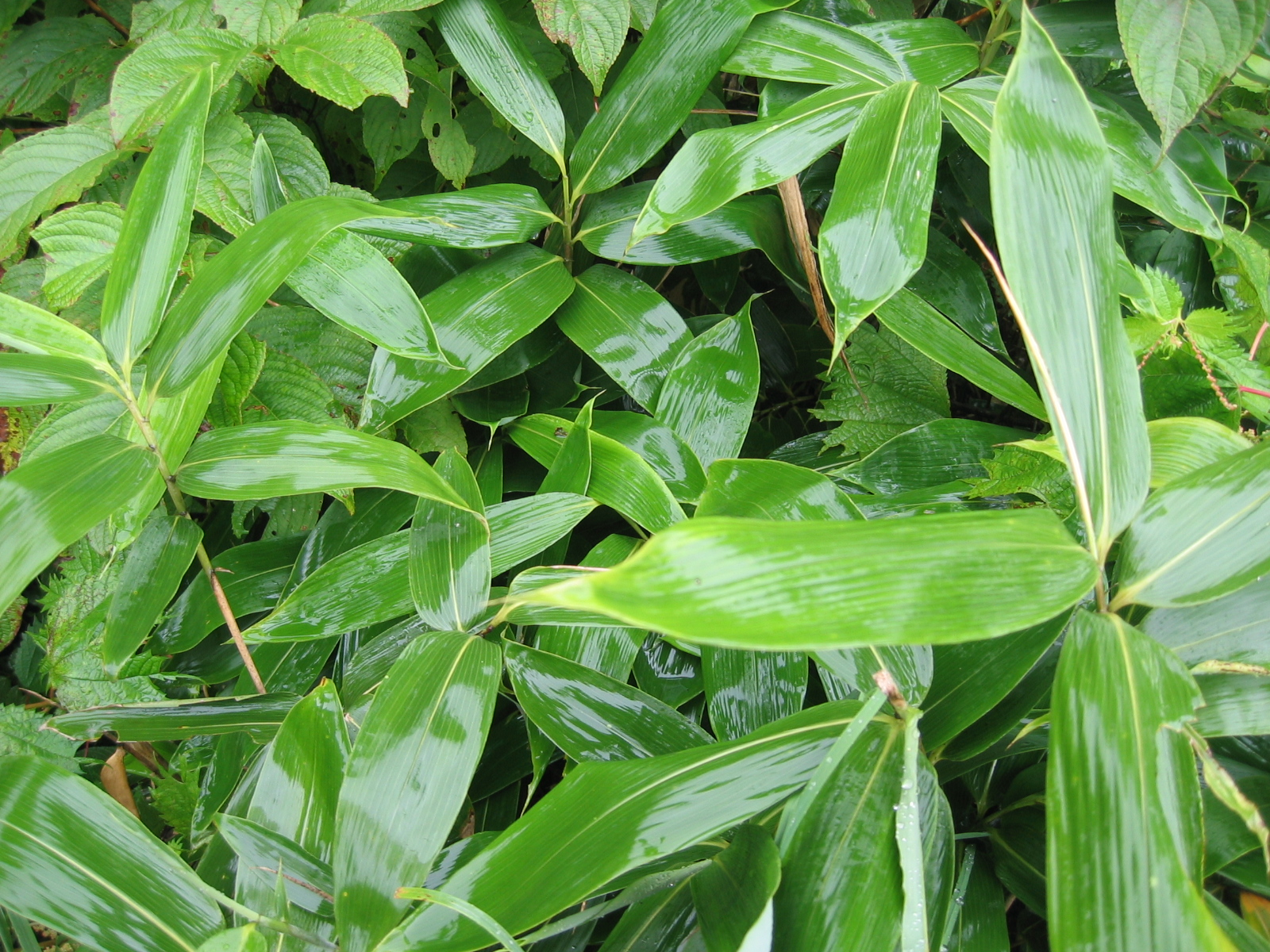

Scientific classification
- Kingdom: Plantae
- Clade: Tracheophytes
- Clade: Angiosperms
- Clade: Monocots
- Clade: Commelinids
- Order: Poales
- Family: Poaceae
- Genus: Sasa
- Species: S. veitchii

Binomial name
- Sasa veitchii (Carrière) Rehder (1919)

Synonyms
- Arundinaria albomarginata (Franch. & Sav.) Makino (1900), nom. superfl.; Arundinaria veitchii (Carrière) N.E.Br. (1889); Bambusa senanensis var. albomarginata Franch. & Sav. (1877); Bambusa veitchii Carrière (1888); Sasa albomarginata (Franch. & Sav.) Makino & Shibata (1901), nom. superfl.

= Sasa veitchii =

Species of plant

Sasa veitchii, also known as kumazasa (Japanese: クマザサ, 隈笹), kuma bamboo grass, or Veitch's bamboo, is a species of bamboo in the genus Sasa (bamboo grasses), in the family Poaceae. It is native to Japan and Sakhalin.

== Name ==
The name kumazasa is from Japanese. 隈 (kuma) refers to a corner, a nook, shade, or a dark area, in this case meaning 隈取り (kumadori, "shading"), referring to the light-colored edges of the mature leaves. 笹 (sasa), one of the two common names for bamboo species, refers to short-growing bamboo species whose culm sheaths remain on the culm as they grow, as opposed to 竹 (take). Besides 隈笹, the word is also occasionally spelled 山白竹, a jukujikun spelling from Chinese meaning "mountain white bamboo", or misspelled 熊笹, mistaking 隈 for its more common homophone 熊 (meaning "bear").

The Japanese term can refer specifically to S. veitchii or more broadly to various other closely related sasa species that grow densely on the forest floor, such as S. kurilensis (チシマザサ, chishimazasa), S. senanensis (クマイザサ, kumaizasa), S. palmata (チマキザサ, chimakizasa), S. nipponica (ミヤコザサ, miyakozasa), and Sasamorpha borealis (スズタケ, suzutake). It may also be the origin of the specific epithet of the take species Shibataea kumasaca (オカメザサ, okamezasa), also spelled kumasasa.

The name "kuma bamboo grass" is a partial calque of kumazasa, translating sasa as "bamboo grass". The name "Veitch's bamboo" is from the specific epithet veitchii, given by Élie-Abel Carrière in 1888 after the Veitch Nurseries, whose plant hunter Charles Maries first brought the plant from Japan to Europe in the late 1870s.

== Description ==
Sasa veitchii is a large species of bamboo grass which may reach a height of 1–2 m (3 ft 3 in – 6 ft 7 in), with leaves about 20 cm (7.9 in) in length and 4–5 cm (1.6–2.0 in) in width. Young leaves are initially uniform green in color but develop light-colored edges as they mature overwinter. In its native Japan, it is found as a dense covering on some forest floors.

== Uses ==
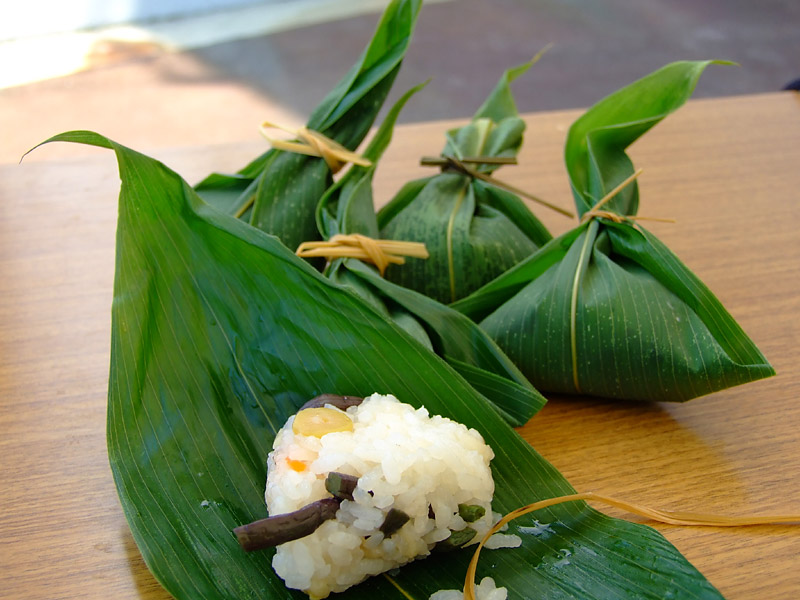
Sushi wrapped in kumazasa leaves

Kumazasa is often planted in gardens as ornamental ground cover. The leaves can be used to make herbal tea, and are traditionally ground up and taken as a folk remedy for diabetes and hypertension, although there is no scientific consensus on its efficacy as a medicine. In Ishikawa, Nagano, and Niigata prefectures, the leaves are used as wrapping for regional varieties of sushi and rice dumplings. It also has some uses as a textile, for example in the manufacture of absorbent floor mats.
