= Parc aux Bambous =

Botanical garden in Broques, Lapenne, Ariège, Midi-Pyrénées, France

Coordinates: 43.1467°N 1.7511°E

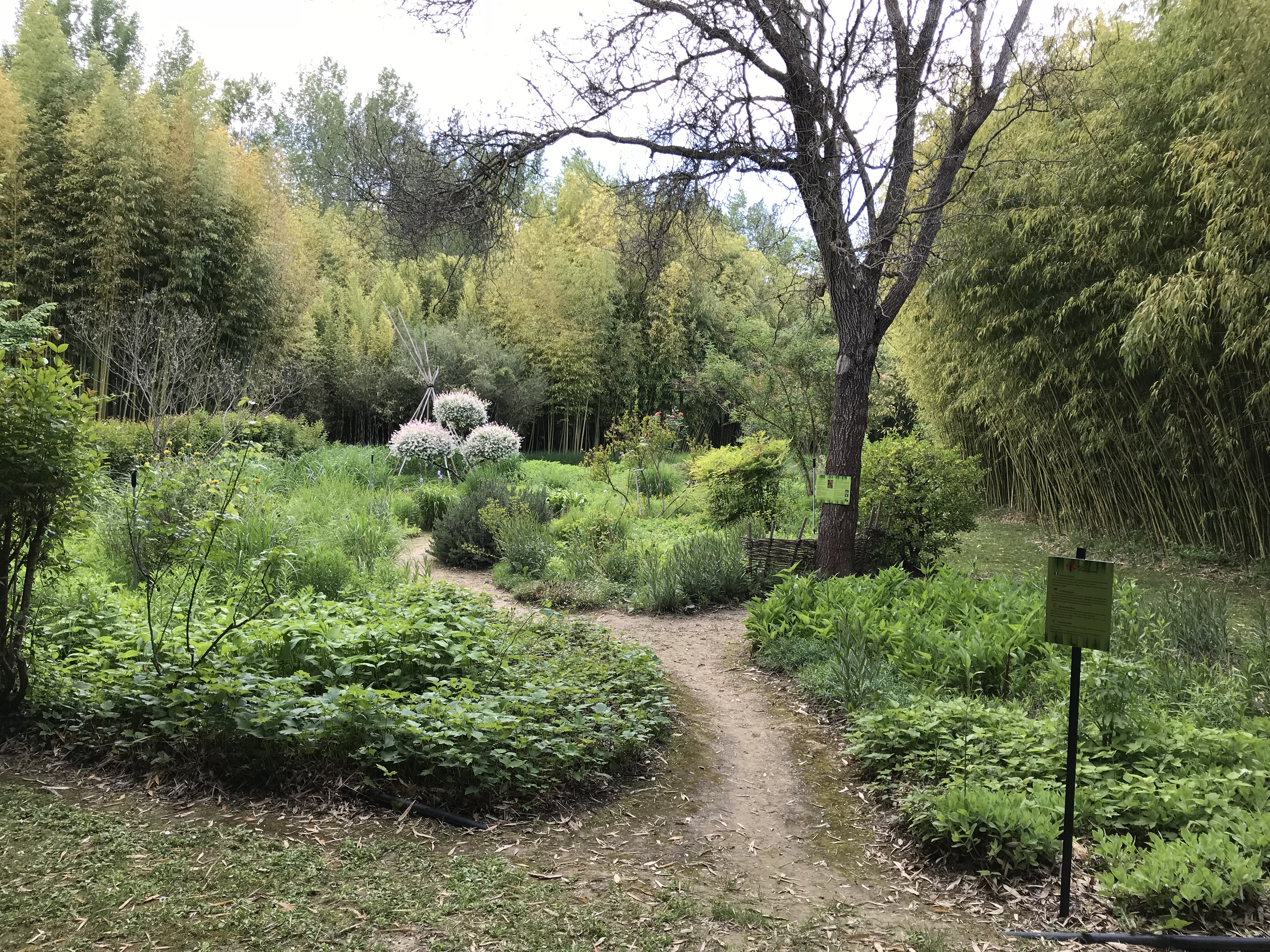
The Parc aux Bambous in Lapenne

The Parc aux Bambous (4 hectares) is a botanical garden specializing in bamboo.

== Location ==
It is located in Broques, Lapenne, Ariège, Midi-Pyrénées, France, and open daily in the warmer months; an admission fee is charged.

== The garden ==
The garden was established on the site of an earlier park dating to the early 20th century, alongside the River Hers, and opened to the public in 2001. In 2006 it was designated a Jardin remarquable.

=== Content ===
Today the garden contains over 100 taxa of bamboo, with a further 50 taxa of Graminaceae (grasses), as well as Japanese sophora and thuja, acacia, oak, black pine, poplar, and broom, lavender, and thyme. Notable plantings include Arundo donax, Arundinaria auricoma, Chimonobambusa marmorea, Chimonobambusa quadrangularis, Chimonobambusa tumissinoda, Fargesia jiuzaighou, Fargesia murielae, Fargesia nitida, Fargesia robusta, Fargesia rufa, Panicum virgatum, Phyllostachys aurea, Phyllostachys viridi-glaucescens, Phyllostachys vivax aureocaulis, Pseudosasa japonica, Sasa veitchii, and Shibataea kumasaca, as well as Cortaderia, Elymus, Miscanthus, and Pennisetum.

== See also ==
- List of botanical gardens in France
