= Fargesia Rufa =

Fargesia Rufa can refer to bamboos of the genus Fargesia:

- Fargesia 'Rufa', a.k.a. Gansu 95-1
- Fargesia rufa, a.k.a. qingchuan jianzhu
