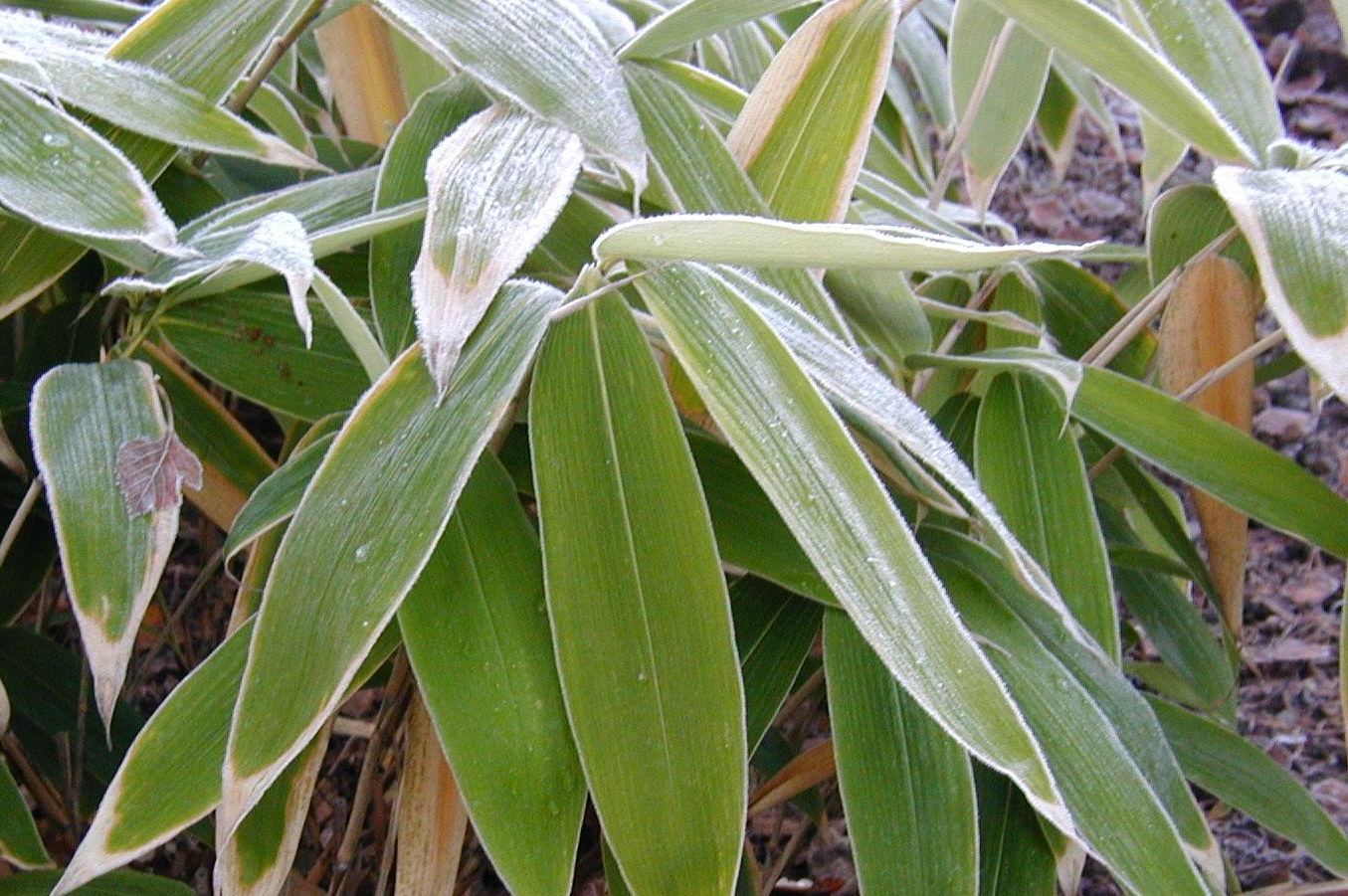
- Sasa palmata foliage in winter

Scientific classification
- Kingdom: Plantae
- Clade: Tracheophytes
- Clade: Angiosperms
- Clade: Monocots
- Clade: Commelinids
- Order: Poales
- Family: Poaceae
- Subfamily: Bambusoideae
- Tribe: Arundinarieae
- Subtribe: Arundinariinae
- Genus: Sasa; Makino & Shibata

Species
- 39; see text

Synonyms
- Neosasamorpha Tatew.; Nipponobambusa Muroi

= Sasa (plant) =

Genus of bamboo plants

Sasa is a genus of bamboo and part of the grass family (Poaceae). Sasa are characterized as being dwarf species of bamboo, typically under 2m in height, producing many thin culms from a highly branched and running root stock with only one branch per node. For their size, they have relatively large, wide leaves leading to the common name broadleaf bamboo.

All species are native to Asia, with the majority are native to Japan. Some species of Sasa have the northern-most distribution of any bamboo species and are native to Sakhalin in the Russian Far East and the nearby Kuril islands. The genus name Sasa is derived from the Japanese name sasa (笹 / ササ) meaning bamboo grass, used to distinguish Sasa from taller bamboo in Japan.

== Description ==
Sasa is a genus of relatively short and shrub-like bamboos that may vigorously spread to form dense, often extensive stands. The rhizomes of Sasa species are leptomorph (or spreading), with long, running and much branched underground roots. Their culms are tillering, and may grow between 30 cm to 3 m in height, and up to 1 cm in diameter depending on the species. The nodes along culms are prominent in most species but are sometimes level and smooth and without grooves. At the nodes, a single branch is formed, often about the same diameter as the culm. The culm sheaths are papery or even leathery and are very persistent, usually remaining attached to the culm unless removed. The leaves form a palmate arrangement and are generally large compared to most bamboos, in both length and width, and the leaves are very large compared with the size of the culms.

When flowering, the inflorescence is typically in form of a loose panicle containing 4 to 8 florets per spikelet, and 6 stamens and 3 stigmas per floret.

The genus Sasa was first formally described by the Japanese botanists Tomitaro Makito and Keita Shibata, when it published in Botanical Magazine in 1901.

== Distribution and habitat ==
The genus Sasa is native to Asia, with the native distribution of the genus extending from Sakhalin and the Kuril islands of Russia to the north, southwards through Japan and Korea, and across the southeast region of China including Guangxi, Guangdong, Hong Kong, and Hainan.

Sasa along with the closely related genus Sasamorpha contain the only species of bamboo native to Russia, with the Sasa species S. cernua, S. kurilensis, S. megaphylla, and S. senanensis (along with Sasamorpha borealis) found the furthest north of any species of bamboo with all the aforementioned species being native to Sakhalin and/or the Kuril islands of the Russian Far East.

The majority of Sasa species are only native to Japan and are primarily found in the temperate biome; however, some species, such as Sasa chartacea, native to Hokkaido and Honshu in Japan grow primarily in the subalpine or subarctic biome; whilst a few others, such as Sasa hainanensis, native to Hainan, China grow primarily in the subtropical biome.

In Japan, Sasa species are estimated to cover a land area of about 50% in mountainous regions, with such regions making up about 250,000 km^{2} or 70% of the whole land area of the country. In Hallasan National Park in Jeju island, South Korea, Sasa palmata (known locally as Jeju-Joritdae) covers approximately 76% of the northern slopes of Hallasan, the highest mountain in the country.

== Naming ==
Other than binomial names, in Japan bamboo is also named and classified into traditional groups based on multiple factors other than botany. The genus name Sasa is derived from the Japanese term sasa (笹 / ササ) traditionally used to categorize and name some dwarf bamboos. In scientific or academic usage, the Japanese word for all bamboo is take (竹 / たけ), but when used in other contexts, take is used to refer to tall growing types of bamboo, with mosochiku (Phyllostachys edulis), madake (Phyllostachys bambusoides), and hachiku (Phyllostachys nigra) being popular examples in Japan. In contrast, zasa or sasa (笹 / ササ) meaning 'bamboo grass' is used to refer to short growing species.

The use of zasa or sasa is not only seen in discussing a category of bamboos, but is also a part of traditional Japanese names for most Sasa species, for example Sasa kurilensis is known as chishima zasa (チシマザサ), Sasa palmata is known as chimaki zasa, Sasa veitchii is known as kumazasa.

As the Japanese classification of zasa/sasa or 'bamboo grass' does not strictly follow botanical classification, genera other than Sasa with a similar habit are also considered to be zasa/sasa, with Japanese names reflecting this, for example Pleioblastus viridistriatus is known as kamuro zasa; Shibataea kumasaca (or erroneously S. kumasasa), known as okame zasa (or 'lucky bamboo grass'); and Sasaella ramosa called azuma zasa.

== Species ==
As of February 2025, Plants of the World Online (POWO) recognize the genus Sasa to contain 39 accepted species; whilst World Flora Online (WFO) recognize 42 accepted species.

Amongst plant names, the genus Sasa contains a large number of synonyms; as of February 2025, WFO recognizes 727 names as synonyms at all ranks (92% of all 787 recorded names), and 440 species names as synonyms (90% of all 490 recorded species names).

The following is a list containing a selection of Sasa species as accepted by authorities at Kew/POWO in May 2025 and their native distributions:

- Sasa cernua Makino – Japan (northern/central Japan); Russia (Kuril islands, Sakhalin)
- Sasa chartacea (Makino) Makino & Shibata – Japan (Hokkaido, Honshu)
- Sasa elegantissima Koidz. – Japan (Hokkaido, Honshu)
- Sasa fugeshiensis Koidz. – Japan (western Honshu)
- Sasa gracillima Nakai – Japan (central/southern Honshu, Kyushu)
- Sasa hainanensis C.D.Chu & C.S.Chao – China (Hainan)
- Sasa hayatae Makino – Japan (central/southern Japan)
- Sasa heterotricha Koidz. – Japan (northern/central Honshu)
- Sasa hibaconuca Koidz. – northern and central Japan
- Sasa jotanii (Kenji Inoue & Tanim.) M.Kobay. – Japan (Izu-Shoto)
- Sasa kagamiana Makino & Uchida – Japan (northern Honshu, Shikoku)
- Sasa kurilensis (Rupr.) Makino & Shibata – Korea (Utsuryo-to), Russia (Sakhalin, Kuril islands) to Japan (northern/central Japan)
- Sasa magnifica (Nakai) Sad.Suzuki – Japan (Kyushu (Kumamoto Pref.))
- Sasa megalophylla Makino & Uchida – Japan; Russia (Sakhalin, Kuril islands)
- Sasa miakeana Sad.Suzuki – Japan (Honshu and Shikoku)
- Sasa minensis Sad.Suzuki – Japan (Honshu and Shikoku)
- Sasa nipponica (Makino) Makino & Shibata – Japan
- Sasa occidentalis Sad.Suzuki – Japan (Shikoku)
- Sasa palmata (Burb.) E.G.Camus – Korea, Japan, Russia (Sakhalin)
- Sasa pubens Nakai – Japan (west-central Honshu)
- Sasa pubiculmis Makino – Japan (Hokkaido, eastern Honshu, and Shikoku)
- Sasa pulcherrima Koidz. – central and southern Japan
- Sasa rubrovaginata C.H.Hu – China (Guangxi and Guangdong)
- Sasa samaniana Miyabe & Kudô – Japan (southern Hokkaido and eastern Honshu)
- Sasa scytophylla Koidz. – Japan (Honshu and Shikoku)
- Sasa senanensis (Franch. & Sav.) Rehder – Japan (Hokkaido, northern Honshu, Kuril islands); Russia (Sakhalin, Kuril islands)
- Sasa septentrionalis Makino – southern Sakhalin and northern and central Japan
- Sasa shimidzuana Makino – central and southern Japan
- Sasa subglabra McClure – China (Hong Kong)
- Sasa subvillosa Sad.Suzuki – Japan (northern and north-central Honshu)
- Sasa suzukii Nakai – Japan (northern and central Honshu)
- Sasa takizawana Makino & Uchida – Japan (southern Hokkaido, Honshu, and Shikoku)
- Sasa tatewakiana Makino – Sakhalin and northern and central Japan
- Sasa tenuifolia Nakai – Japan (southern Honshu)
- Sasa tokugawana Makino – central and southern Japan
- Sasa tsuboiana Makino – Korea (Jeju-do); Japan (central + southern Japan)
- Sasa tsukubensis Nakai – Japan
- Sasa veitchii (Carrière) Rehder – Japan (including Kuril islands); Russia (Sakhalin, Kuril islands)
- Sasa yahikoensis Makino – Sakhalin to northern and central Japan

The genus Sasaella derives from the hybridization of species of Sasa and Pleioblastus (Sasa × Pleioblastus).

== Uses ==
=== Culinary use ===
Various species of Sasa have a long history of culinary use.

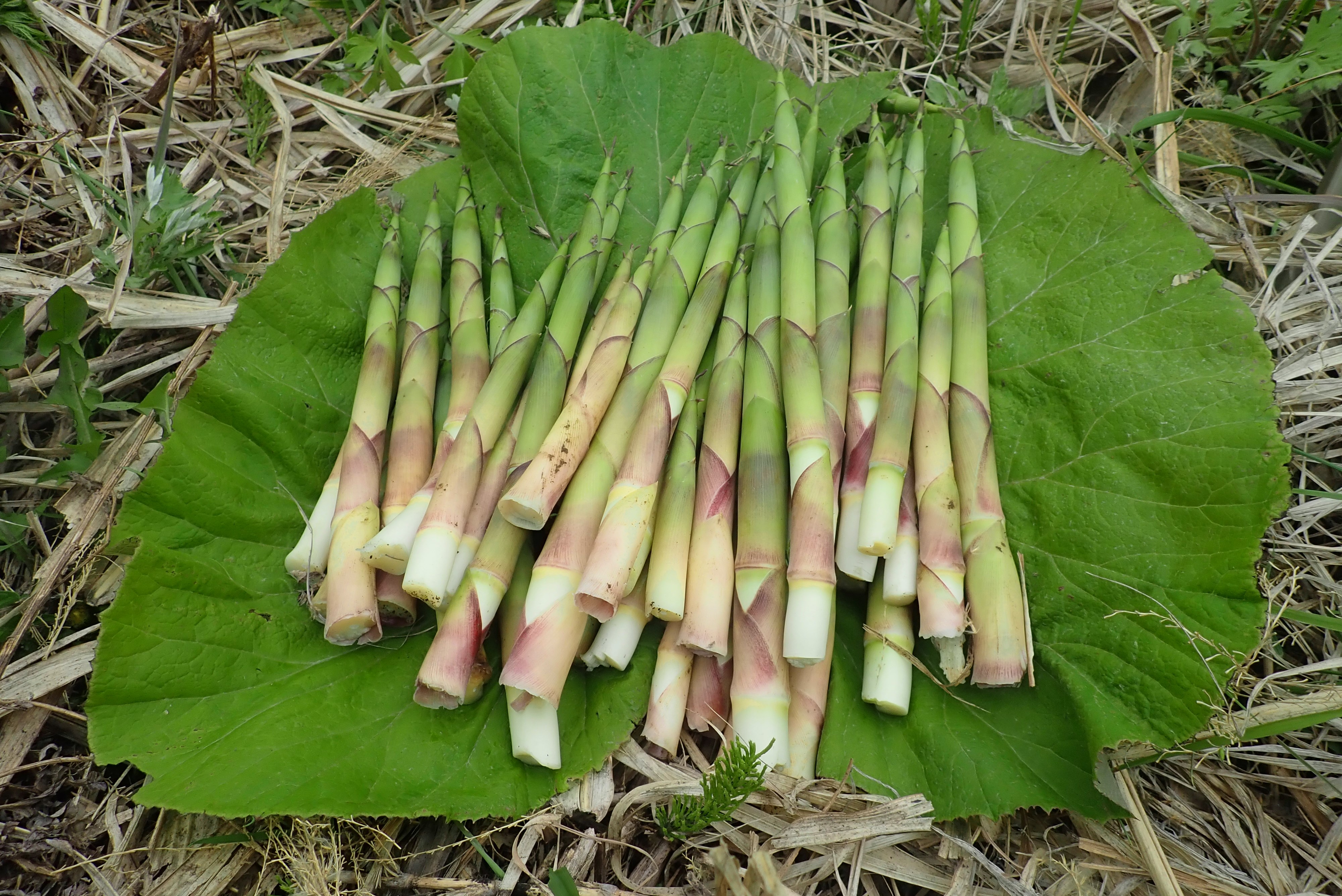
Freshly harvested culms of Sasa kurilensis (known as chishima zasa) prepared as a vegetable in Japan

The young shoots of some Sasa species are edible. Sansai (literally translated as 'mountain vegetables') traditionally refers to vegetables that have grown in the wild and then foraged by humans, as opposed to being cultivated or farmed. Young culms of Sasa kurilensis are known in Japan as chishima-zasa (チシマザサ) or nemagaridake and are particularly popular in Hokkaido and other parts of northern Japan.

Not only are the shoots eaten, but Sasa leaves are used widely in Japan as wrapper to hold rice dumplings or rice cake together, whilst imparting a subtle hint of bamboo flavor to the rice.

Sasazushi (笹寿司), also known as bamboo leaf sushi, is a speciality from the Hokuriku region of Japan, in particular Niigata and the cities of Jōetsu, Itoigawa and Myōkō. Sasazushi is made by placing rice (seasoned with vinegar, sugar and salt) onto a Sasa bamboo leaf (known as kumazasa or kuma) that grows wild in the region before being topped with a selection of ingredients and condiments. Not only is the bamboo leaf a local, wild plant, other types of sansai (or foraged wild vegetables) are frequently used as toppings, such as Japanese butterbur (fukinoto), fiddleheads of bracken fern (warabi), and other types of fern including zenmai and kogomi.

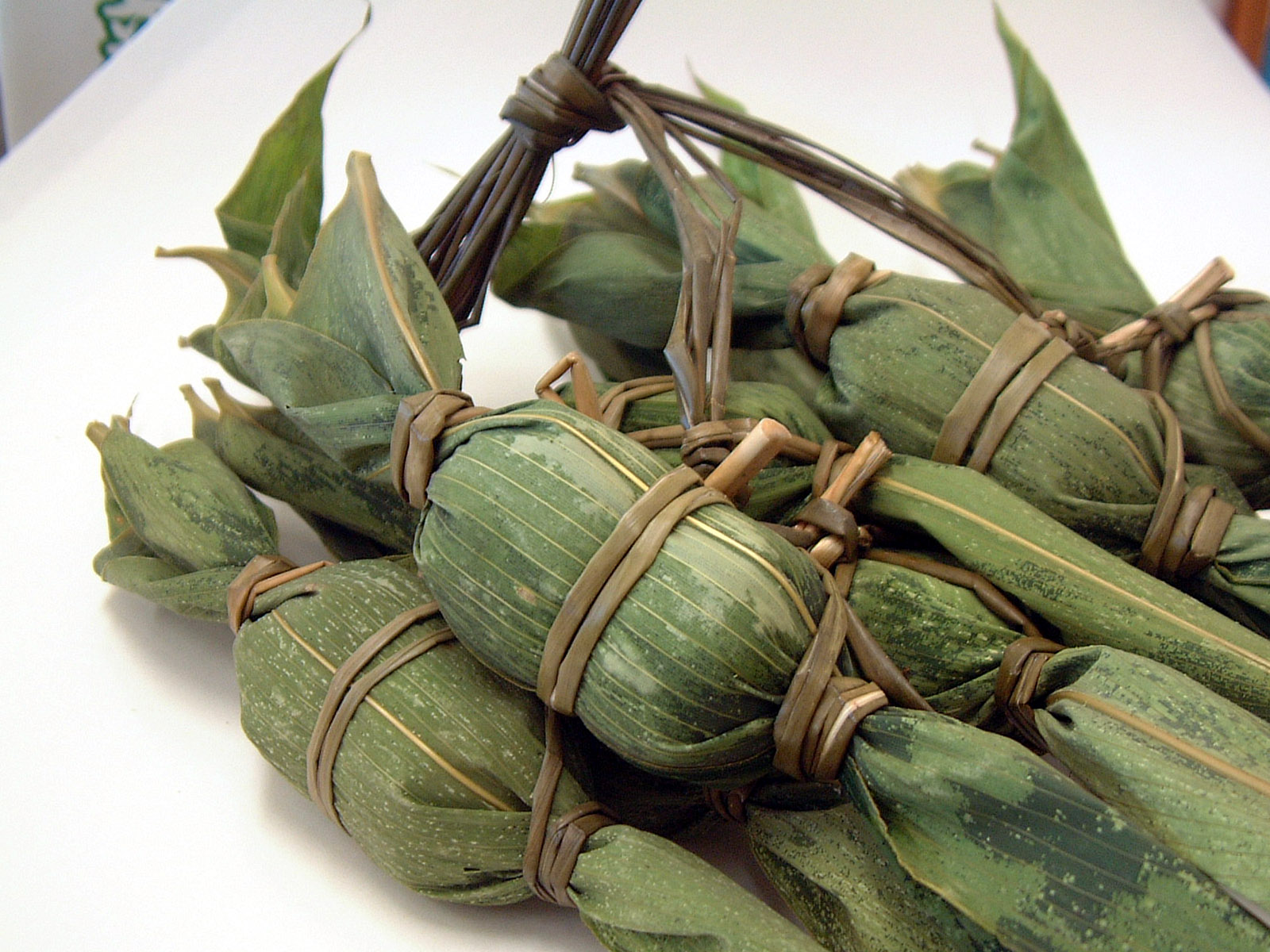
Sasadango is a speciality of Niigata and surrounding regions. It is a sweet rice cake filled with anko and flavored with yomogi before being wrapped in Sasa bamboo leaves and tied up with sedge

Chimaki are a type of dumpling from Japan, very similar to the Chinese dumpling zonghi but with different fillings. Chimaki usually consist of a mixture of glutinous rice and other ingredients which are carefully wrapped in a Sasa bamboo leaf and usually tied with rushes before steaming. Chimaki may be savory, composed of rice, meat and vegetables, or sweet, containing sticky glutinous rice, yokan (sweet red bean gelatin), or kudzu. Chimaki are particularly associated with Akita, Niigata, Yamagata, and the Aizu region of Fukushima Prefecture, with unique local variations. In Akita, sasamaki is prepared in a comparable way but consists of only glutinous rice wrapped in Sasa leaves, tied with rushes, and steamed reflecting a time when glutinous rice was less abundant and more expensive than Uruchi rice, so it has long been used as a celebratory food.

The desert delicacy sasadango a type of dango originally from the Chuetsu and Shimoetsu regions of Niigata and parts of Aizu region, Fukushima Prefecture. Sweet, glutinous rice flour is flavored with yomogi (a type of mugwort) which are then filled with adzuki (red) bean paste and wrapped in Sasa leaves and tied up with sedge leaves.

=== Animal feed ===
Sasa can be used as a feed for livestock. Various Sasa species are natural primary forage plants for wildlife, including for example Sasa nipponica is a core component in the diet of Sika deer on Mount Ohdaigahara, central Japan. Whilst most livestock rearing in Japan happens outside of mountainous regions, due to the mountainous nature of the country and the widespread coverage of these regions by various Sasa species, along with its evergreen nature make Sasa a useful feedstock, particularly in the winter months. Sasa palmata has been shown to be comparable or superior to rice straw as a component of roughage fed to Hanwoo cattle, a Korean native breed.

=== Textiles ===
Washi (和紙), literally meaning 'Japanese paper'; is a type of paper that has been made for over 1000 years, traditionally made by hand using fibers from the inner bark of gampi (Wikstroemia species), mitsumata (Edgeworthia chrysantha), or kōzo (Broussonetia papyrifera). Unlike paper made from wood pulp, some washi can be made to be strong enough to be used as cloth or linen and used to make clothes. More recently, through research by Mitsuo Kimura of Mie University in Japan, a technique to make washi out of kumazasa (Sasa) has been developed with products including slippers, bath towels and bedding made by the Sasawashi Company in Japan.

== Cultivation ==
Along with other genera of bamboo, the era of botanical expeditions and plant hunting in 19th century saw the introduction and cultivation of Sasa in Western gardens, with Sasa veitchii introduced to Britain in 1879; with Sasa palmata introduced in about 1889. Both Sasa species are frequently grown in the UK today, as is Sasa tsuboiana, amongst other species. Other than the UK, Sasa species (chiefly S. palmata and S. veitchii) have been recorded as having been introduced into Czechoslovakia (Czech Republic and/or Slovakia), France, Ireland, and New Zealand.

Perhaps with the exception of Indocalamus tessellatus, Sasa palmata has the largest, widest leaves of any temperate bamboo, and along with its evergreen nature, gives a tropical air to temperate gardens yet is hardy to -15 °C or more.

The new leaves of all Sasa species are green but some species, such as Sasa veitchii, experience necrosis in response to freezing temperatures developing ornamental and uniform, distinctive lighter-colored margins. Variegated selections of some Sasa species are also cultivated, including Sasa kurilensis 'Shima-shimofuri'.

In situations where the vigorous, running nature of bamboo such as Sasa species may be a problem, bamboo can be contained either by planting it in a pot or planter, or by installing a solid root barrier that prevents the spread of bamboo rhizomes outside of the chosen area. Soil conditions and location can also have an impact on the spread of running bamboo, with Sasa being particularly vigorous in fertile, moisture retentive soil in partial shade.

== Fossil record ==
Fossil leaves of †Sasa kodorica are described from the Pliocene of Kodori Valley in Abkhazia, Georgia.

== See also ==
- Pseudosasa another genus of bamboo
