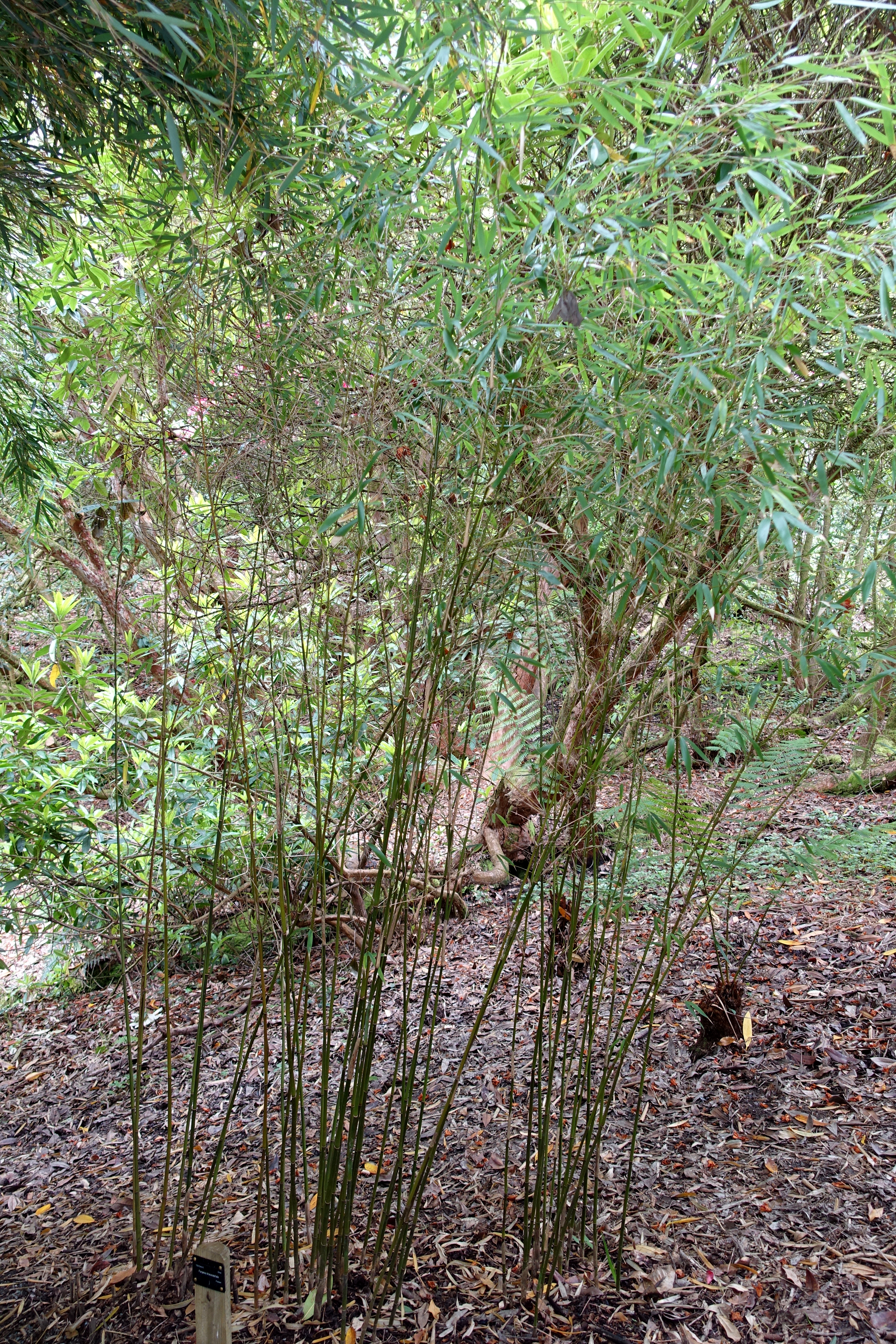

Scientific classification
- Kingdom: Plantae
- Clade: Tracheophytes
- Clade: Angiosperms
- Clade: Monocots
- Clade: Commelinids
- Order: Poales
- Family: Poaceae
- Genus: Fargesia
- Species: F. dracocephala

Binomial name
- Fargesia dracocephala T.P.Yi

= Fargesia dracocephala =

Species of grass

Fargesia dracocephala is a woody bamboo native to central China. It is known in Chinese as longtou jianzhu (Chinese: 龙头箭竹; pinyin: lóngtóujiǎnzhú), meaning dragon head Fargesia. The scientific name is derived from Ancient Greek and has the same meaning. It is found at high elevations in the south of Gansu, western Hubei, southern Shaanxi and northern Sichuan. The plant is a significant source of food for the giant panda.

There is a bamboo cultivated in the west sold under the same name, but it is actually a recently described species, namely Fargesia apicirubens. Confusingly, the most common cultivar of F. dracocephala is sometimes sold in the west under the name Fargesia rufa, which is a different species. When properly designated, it appears as Fargesia 'Rufa'.
