= Fargesia 'Rufa' =

Grass cultivar

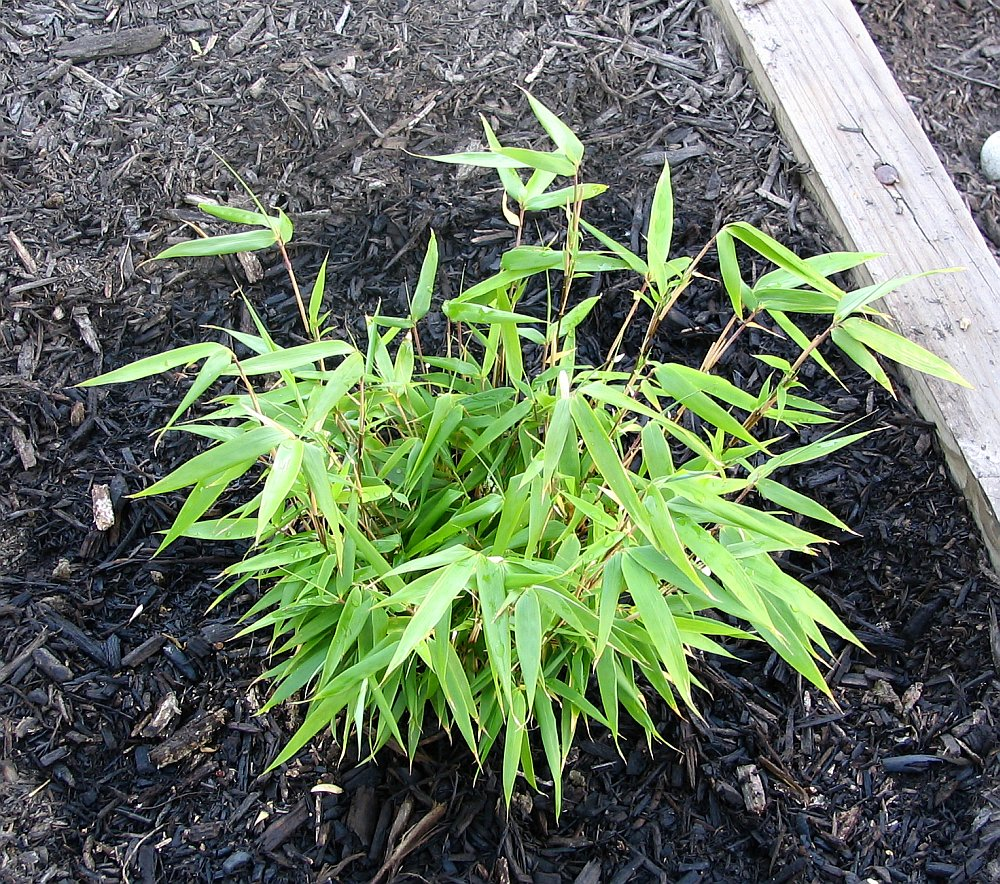
- Genus: Fargesia
- Cultivar: 'Rufa'
- Origin: China, Gansu Province, 1995

Fargesia 'Rufa', sometimes also sold under the name Gansu 95-1 or incorrectly as Fargesia rufa (which is a distinct species), is a commonly cultivated form of bamboo. Its origin is somewhat mysterious, but morphological evidence suggests that it is a cultivar of Fargesia dracocephala. It was introduced into the western horticultural trade in 1995 from the Gansu Province in northwest China.

== Gallery ==

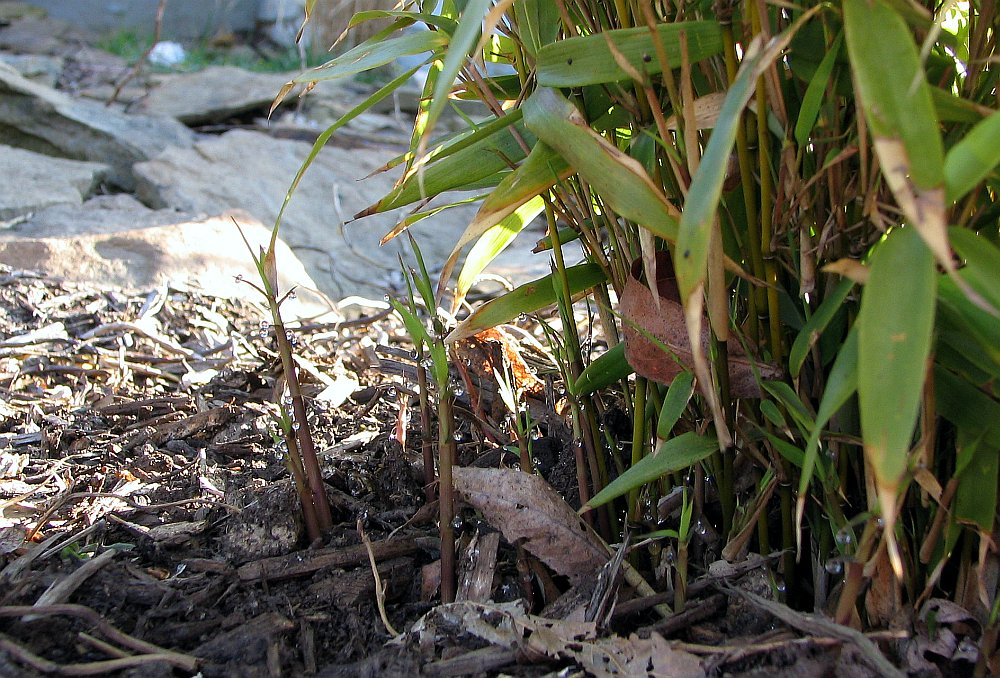
