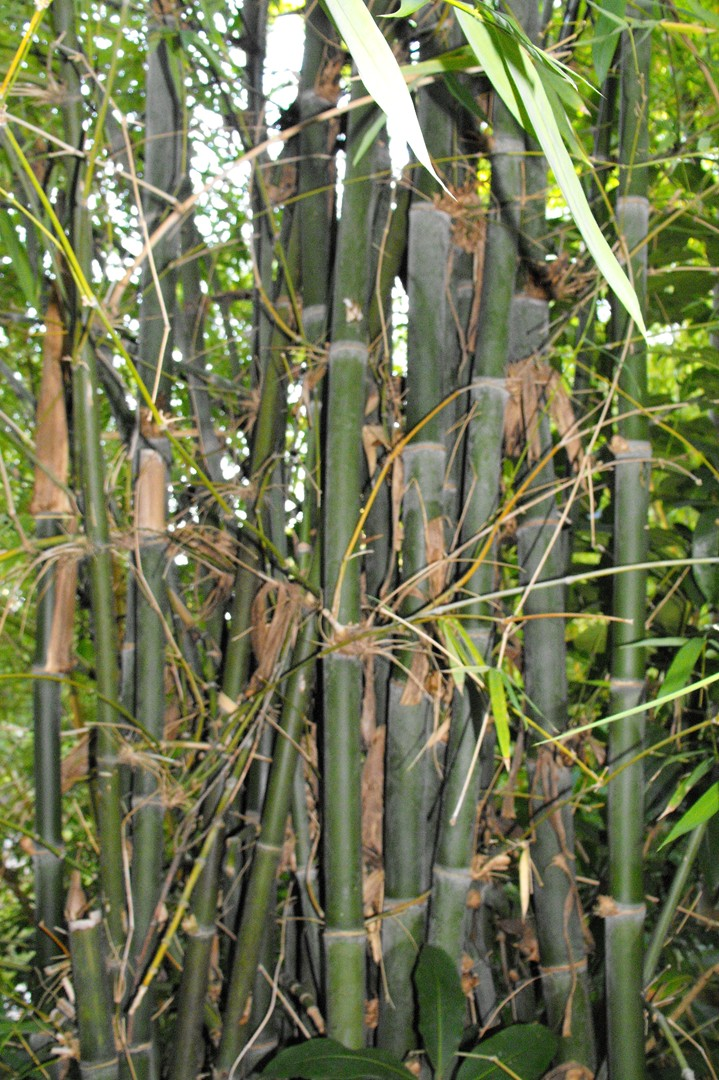

Scientific classification
- Kingdom: Plantae
- Clade: Tracheophytes
- Clade: Angiosperms
- Clade: Monocots
- Clade: Commelinids
- Order: Poales
- Family: Poaceae
- Genus: Sasa
- Species: S. tsuboiana

Binomial name
- Sasa tsuboiana Makino

Synonyms
- Homotypic Synonyms: Sasaella tsuboiana (Makino) Muroi; Heterotypic Synonyms: Neosasamorpha stenophylla (Koidz.) Sad.Suzuki; Neosasamorpha stenophylla subsp. tobagenzoana (Koidz.) Sad.Suzuki; Neosasamorpha tobagenzoana (Koidz.) Tatew.; Sasa amagiensis Makino; Sasa australis Makino; Sasa encaustiomarginata Koidz.; Sasa hatchoensis Nakai; Sasa ishizuchiana Makino ex Koidz.; Sasa kurokawana Makino; Sasa kurokawana f. aureostriata Muroi & Yu.Tanaka; Sasa kurokewae Muroi; Sasa maxima Nakai; Sasa mukogunensis Koidz.; Sasa omokoensis Makino ex Koidz.; Sasa palmata f. australis (Makino) Sad.Suzuki; Sasa palmata var. kurokawana (Makino) Sad.Suzuki; Sasa phyllophorrhachis Koidz.; Sasa stenophylla Koidz.; Sasa stenophylla subsp. tobagenzoana (Koidz.) Sad.Suzuki; Sasa stenophylla subsp. yoshiokae (Nakai) Sad.Suzuki; Sasa tobagenzoana Koidz.; Sasa tsuboiana f. hatchoensis (Nakai) Sad.Suzuki; Sasa tsuboiana f. iyomontana Sad.Suzuki; Sasa yokotae Nakai; Sasa yosiokae Nakai; Sasaella maxima Nakai

= Sasa tsuboiana =

Species of grass

Sasa tsuboiana is a species of flowering plant in the family Poaceae. It is native to Japan and Korea.
