= Lapenne =

Commune in Occitanie, France

- Commune
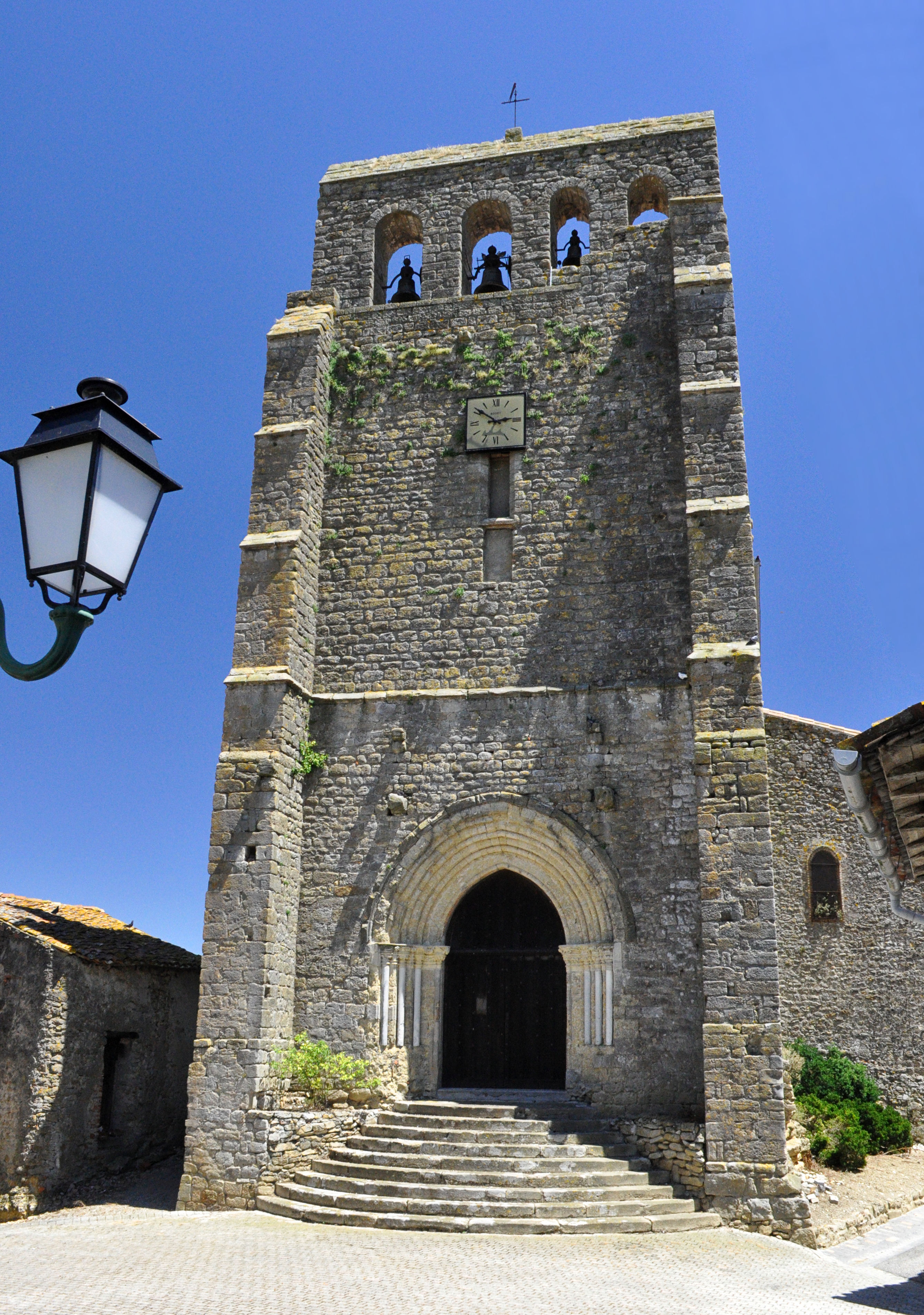
- The church in Lapenne

- Coat of arms
- Location of Lapenne
- Location within France Location within Occitanie
- Coordinates: 43°08′48″N 1°45′04″E
- Country: France
- Region: Occitania
- Department: Ariège
- Arrondissement: Pamiers
- Canton: Mirepoix
- Intercommunality: Pays de Mirepoix

Government
  - Mayor (2020–2026): Lucien Palmade
- Area^{1}: 21.57 km^{2} (8.33 sq mi)
- Elevation: 350 m (1,150 ft)
- Highest elevation: 410 m (1,350 ft)
- Lowest elevation: 244 m (801 ft)
- Population (2023): 119
  - Density: 5.52/km^{2} (14.3/sq mi)
- Time zone: UTC+01:00 (CET)
  - Summer (DST): UTC+02:00 (CEST)
- INSEE/Postal code: 09153 /09500
- ^{1} French Land Register data, which excludes lakes, ponds, glaciers > 1 km^{2} (0.386 sq mi or 247 acres) and river estuaries.

Lapenne (French pronunciation: [lapɛn]; Occitan: La Pena) is a commune in the Ariège department in southwestern France.

== Population ==
Historical population
Year	Pop.	±% p.a.
1968	152	—
1975	135	−1.68%
1982	146	+1.13%
1990	127	−1.73%
1999	131	+0.35%
2007	115	−1.62%
2012	119	+0.69%
2017	127	+1.31%
2023	119	−1.08%
Source: INSEE

== Sights ==
- Le Parc aux Bambous

== See also ==
- Communes of the Ariège department
