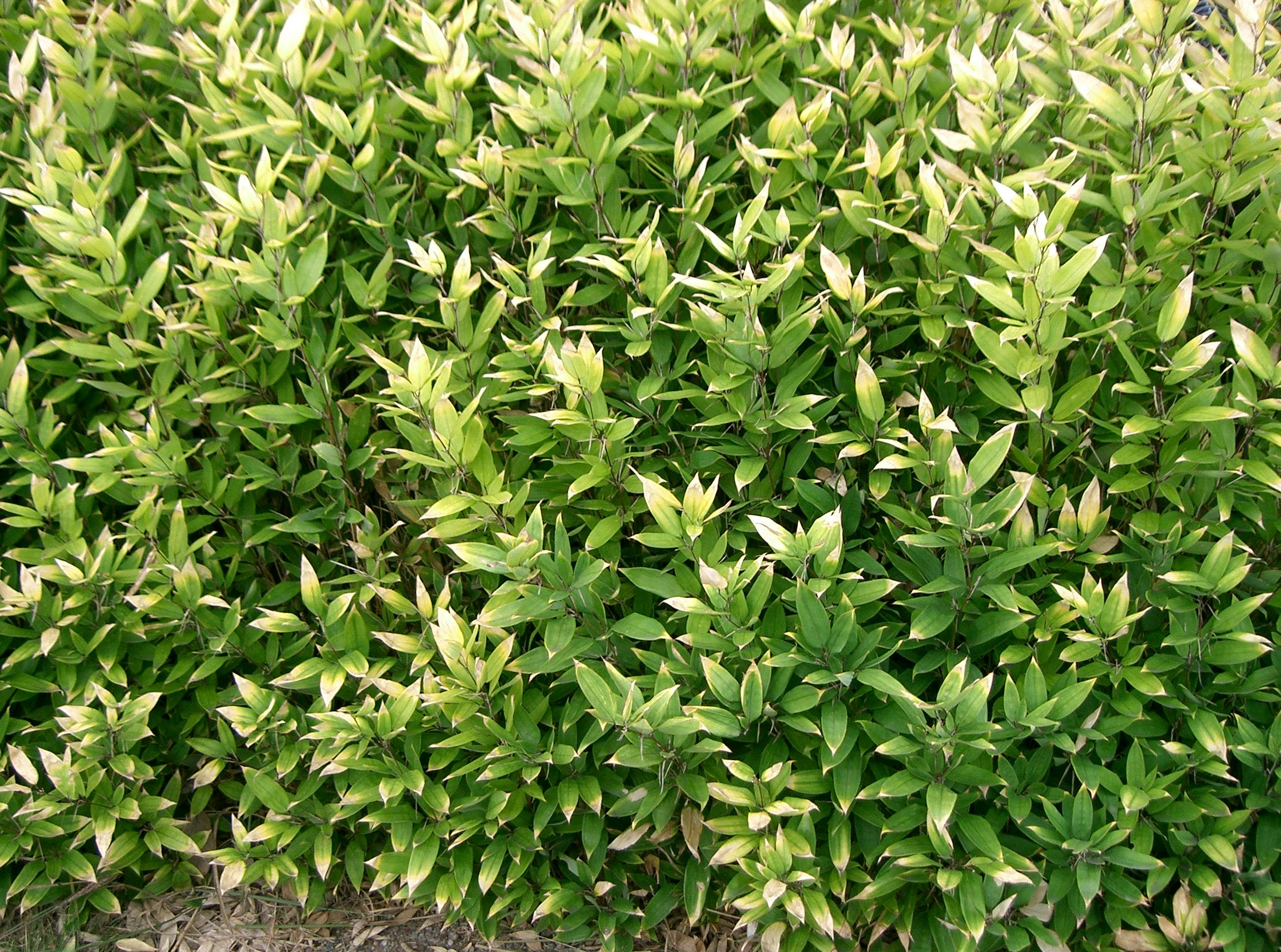
- Shibataea kumasaca

Scientific classification
- Kingdom: Plantae
- Clade: Tracheophytes
- Clade: Angiosperms
- Clade: Monocots
- Clade: Commelinids
- Order: Poales
- Family: Poaceae
- Subfamily: Bambusoideae
- Tribe: Arundinarieae
- Subtribe: Arundinariinae
- Genus: Shibataea; Makino ex Nakai

Type species
- Shibataea kumasaca (Zoll. ex Steud.) Nakai

= Shibataea =

Genus of grasses

Shibataea is a genus of Chinese bamboos in the grass family.

They are unique shorter bamboos with dark green leaves. This genus is more closely related to the genus Phyllostachys than other small bamboos. Excellent as tall groundcover or short hedges, they are especially suited to climates similar to the Pacific Northwest since they dislike dry climates. They not do well with alkaline or water-logged soil. They need acidic conditions to prevent leaf burn. They are sometimes called ruscus-leaved bamboo, as the shape of the leaves resembles that of the genus Ruscus. These bamboos are very resistant to bamboo mites. They are used to make canes.

Species

1. Shibataea chiangshanensis T.H.Wen - Zhejiang
2. Shibataea chinensis Nakai - Anhui, Jiangsu, Jiangxi, Zhejiang
3. Shibataea hispida McClure - Anhui, Zhejiang
4. Shibataea kumasasa (Zoll. ex Steud.) Makino (alternate spelling S. kumasaca) - Fujian, Zhejiang; cultivated in Japan and in other parts of China
5. Shibataea lancifolia C.H.Hu - Fujian, Zhejiang
6. Shibataea nanpingensis Q.F.Zheng & K.F.Huang - Fujian
7. Shibataea strigosa T.H.Wen - Jiangxi, Zhejiang
