= Sunga pitha =

Traditional Assamese and Bengali rice cake

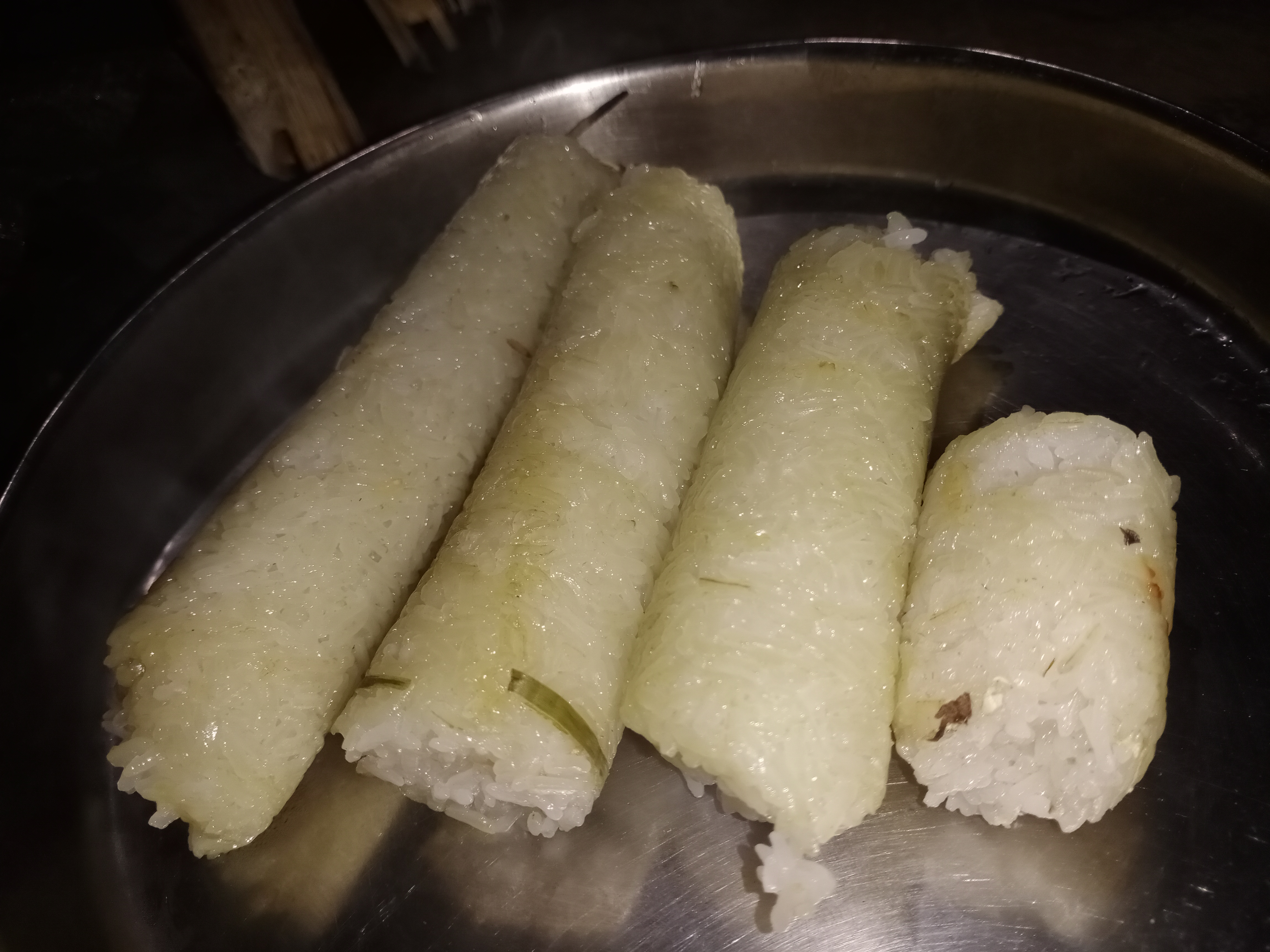
- Alternative names: Sungapura pitha, Sunga pitha, Sunga saul
- Type: Desserts
- Course: Breakfast and light refreshment
- Place of origin: India, Bangladesh
- Region or state: Assam
- Associated cuisine: Assamese, Burmese, Cambodian, Lao, Thai, Vietnamese
- Main ingredients: Glutinous rice and bamboo
- Similar dishes: Sticky rice in bamboo

Sunga pitha (Assamese pronunciation: [suˈŋä piˈtʰä], Sylheti pronunciation: [suŋɡä ɸiʈä́]), Sungapura pitha or Sunga saul is a traditional rice cake (pitha) originating in the Assam and Sylhet region of South Asia. Though its main ingredients are bamboo and glutinous (sticky) rice, it is also made with binni rice, milk, sugar, coconut, and rice powder. This unique delicacy is prepared when sticky rice is stuffed inside young bamboo and smoked slowly. It is popularly known as a distinct and traditional food in Assamese and Sylheti cuisines.

This traditional delicacy is famous in Assam. It is prepared at the time of Magh Bihu or Bhogali Bihu, a harvest festival celebrated in India's northeastern Assam.

== History ==
Sticky rice in bamboo is known as a ubiquitous traditional food in many traditional Southeast Asian communities. In Minangkabau culture, lemang, or lamang is a traditional food which consists of glutinous rice or tapai that is used in various traditional ceremonies, mainly in West Sumatra, Indonesia.

Fish bazaars have been very common throughout Bengal for centuries. People in the Sylhet region buy fish from these markets or catch big fish (rui, katla, chitl, gual, pabda, koi, magur) from the haors and rivers, and fry them to eat. It was seen as a shame not to offer chunga pitha, fried fish, and coconut milk/sweets or murabba, to guests or a new son-in-law at the end of a meal.

The various hill tribes of Sylhet had a tradition of cutting bamboo and putting wet rice inside it. Gradually, the food started to be popular from the hills to the Sylhetis living in the plains. In the course of time, this chunga (bamboo tube) dish came to be known as chunga pitha.

Though atap rice is the main food of the people of Sylhet region, they prefer glutinous rice to make this delicacy.

== Procedure ==
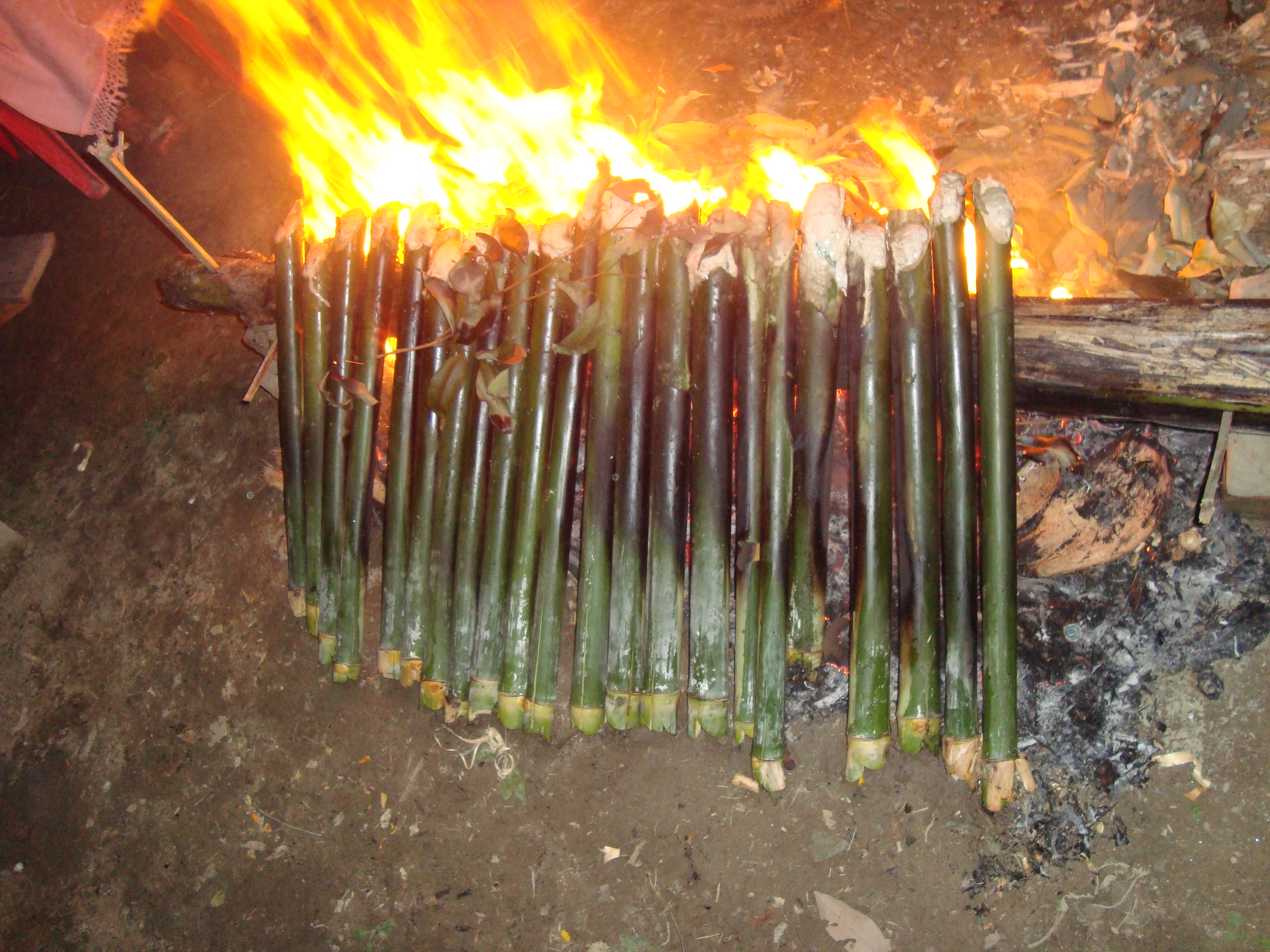
Bamboo is burning to make sunga fita

To make this rice cake, mulibash (a small type of bamboo) is required. This bamboo contains a special type of especially oily chemical that helps not burn the bamboo shoots in a fire. Sticky rice rolled with banana leaf is inserted into the bamboo tube. Then it is burned with straw to make chunga pitha. Due to the presence of excessive juice of the bamboo, the inner part of the tube is boiled in the heat of the fire. This bamboo is used to make different types of rice cakes. In some places, baking is occurred with sticky rice, milk, sugar, coconut, and rice powder.

Once the delicacy is prepared, the rice cake is shaped as a candle and separated from the tube.

== See also ==
- Bangladeshi cuisine
- Zongzi
- Sticky rice in bamboo
- Puto bumbong
