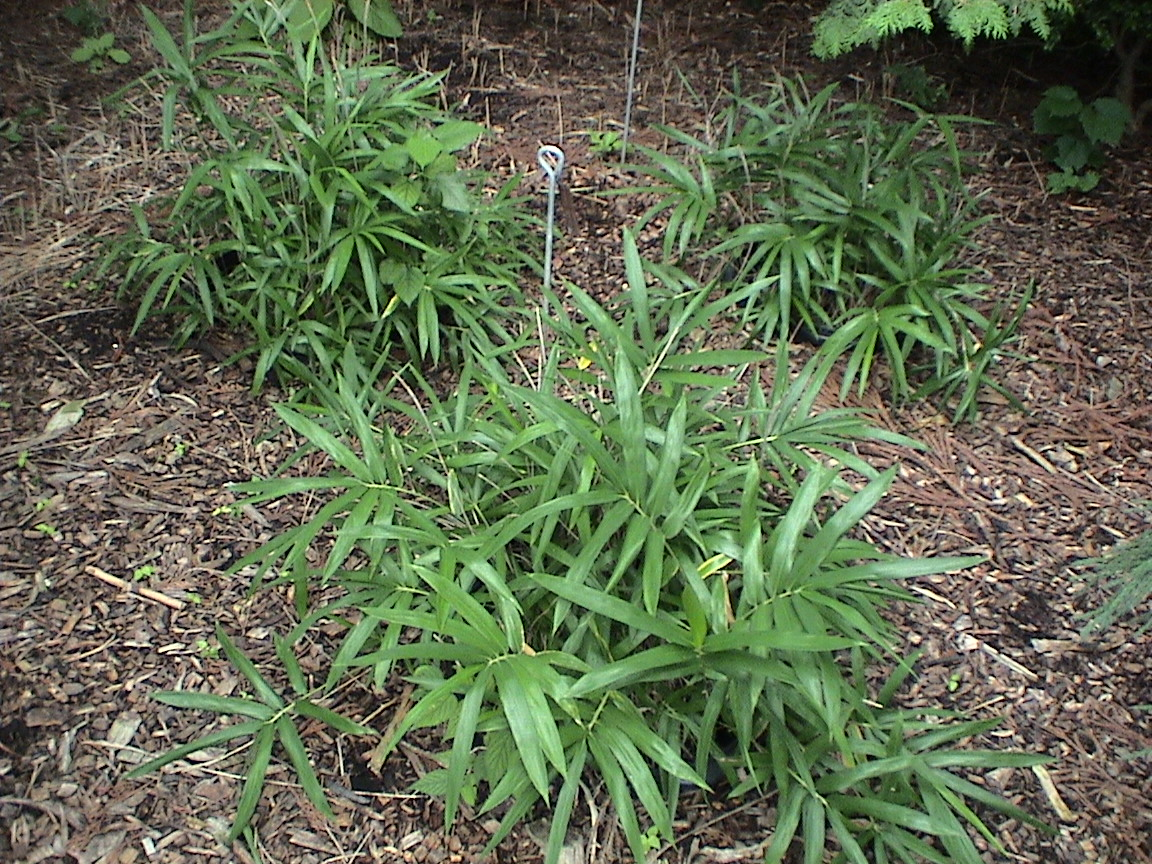

Scientific classification
- Kingdom: Plantae
- Clade: Tracheophytes
- Clade: Angiosperms
- Clade: Monocots
- Clade: Commelinids
- Order: Poales
- Family: Poaceae
- Genus: Sasa
- Species: S. palmata

Binomial name
- Sasa palmata (Burb.) E.G.Camus

= Sasa palmata =

Broadleaf bamboo

Species of grass

Sasa palmata is a species of low-growing, shade-tolerant bamboo that is native to Japan. It is known as broadleaf bamboo or broad-leaved bamboo.
