= Zongzi =

Traditional Chinese food

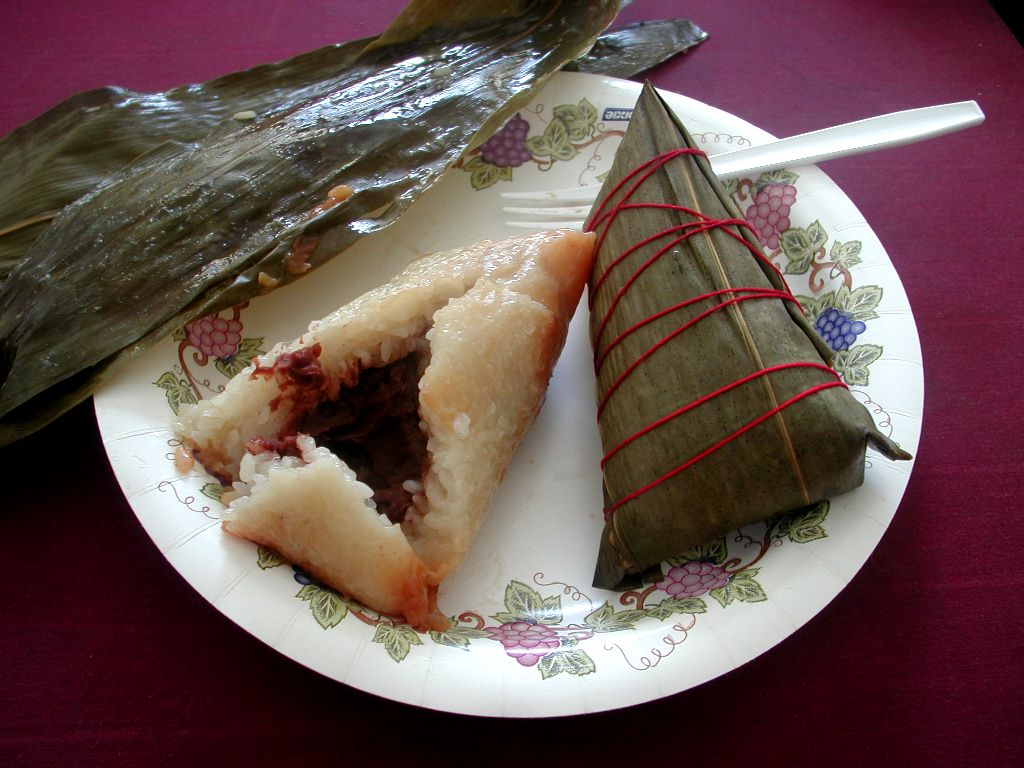
- Zongzi both ready to eat (left) and still wrapped in a bamboo leaf (right)
- Alternative names: rice dumplings, bakcang, bacang, machang, zang, nom asom, phet htok, chimaki
- Type: Rice cake
- Place of origin: China
- Region or state: Chinese-speaking areas East Asia
- Main ingredients: Glutinous rice stuffed with various fillings and wrapped in bamboo or reed leaves
- Variations: Lotus leaf wrap
- Similar dishes: Mont phet htok Chunga pitha

Zongzi
- Chinese: 粽子
Transcriptions
Standard Mandarin
- Hanyu Pinyin: zòngzi
- Wade–Giles: tsung^{4}-tzu^{5}
- IPA: [tsʊ̂ŋ.tsɨ]

Cantonese name
- Chinese: 糉
Transcriptions
Yue: Cantonese
- Yale Romanization: júng
- Jyutping: zung2
- IPA: [tsʊŋ˧˥]

Southern Min name
- Traditional Chinese: 肉粽
Transcriptions
Southern Min
- Hokkien POJ: bah-chàng / mah-chàng
- Tâi-lô: bah-tsàng / mah-tsàng

Eastern Min name
- Chinese: 粽
Transcriptions
Eastern Min
- Fuzhou BUC: cáe̤ng / Min Dong Chinese pronunciation: [tsɔyŋ˨˩˨]

Zongzi (Chinese: 粽子; pinyin: zòngzi), simply zong (Chinese: 粽; pinyin: zòng; Jyutping: zung^{2}) or translated as rice dumplings and, alternatively, as Chinese tamales, is a traditional Chinese rice dish made of glutinous rice stuffed with a range of fillings and wrapped in bamboo leaves. Fillings can be either sweet, such as red bean paste, or savory, such as pork belly or Chinese sausage. The bamboo for wrapping the zongzi is generally of the species Indocalamus tessellatus, although sometimes reed or other large flat leaves may be used. Zongzi are cooked by steaming or boiling.

== Names ==
As it diffused to other regions of Asia over many centuries, zongzi became known by various names in different languages and cultures, including phet htok (ဖက်ထုပ်) in Burmese-speaking areas (such as Myanmar), nom chang (នំចាំង) in Cambodia, machang in Philippines, bacang in Indonesia, khanom chang (ຂະໜົມຈັ້ງ) or ba chang (ບ๊ะຈ່າງ) in Laos, and ba-chang (บ๊ะจ่าง) in Thailand.

Vietnamese cuisine also has a variation on this dish known as bánh ú tro or bánh tro.

In Malaysia, Indonesia, Singapore, and Taiwan, zongzi is known as bakcang, bacang, or zang (from Hokkien Chinese: 肉粽; Pe̍h-ōe-jī: bah-chàng; lit. 'meat zong', as Hokkien is commonly used among overseas Chinese); Straits Peranakans also know them as the derivative kueh chang (粿粽, Hokkien: kóe-chàng, ) in their Malay dialect. Similarly, zongzi is more popularly known as machang among Chinese Filipinos in the Philippines.

Japanese cuisine has leaf-wrapped glutinous rice flour dumplings called chimaki (粽). They may be tetrahedral, square, rectangular, or long narrow conical in shape.

In some areas of the United States, particularly California and Texas, zongzi are often known as "Chinese tamales".

In Mauritius, zongzi (typically called zong), is a traditional dish which continues to be eaten by the Sino-Mauritian and by the Overseas Chinese communities.

== Popular origin myths ==
What has become established popular belief amongst the Chinese is that zongzi has since the days of yore been a food offering to commemorate the death of Qu Yuan, a famous poet from the kingdom of Chu who lived during the Warring States period. Known for his patriotism, Qu Yuan tried to counsel his king to no avail, and drowned himself in the Miluo River in 278 BC. (Note: After composing the Jiu Zhang ("Nine Declarations") part of the Chu ci; this according to Wang Yi, the ancient (Han dynasty period) commentator to Qu Yuan as a poet. (More specifically, penning Lament for Ying portion of the Nine Declarations when the Qin general Bai Qi captured Yingtu, then the capital of Chu, in 278 BC).) The Chinese people were grateful for Qu Yuan's talent and loyalty to serve the country. They cast rice dumplings into the Miluo River on the day when Qu Yuan drowned in the river every year, hoping that the fish in the river would eat the rice dumplings without harming Qu Yuan's body.

Qu Yuan died in 278 BC, but the earliest known documented association between him and the zong dumplings occurs much later, in the mid 5th century (Chinese: 世说新语; pinyin: Shìshuō Xīnyǔ, or A New Account of the Tales of the World), And a widely observed popular cult around him did not develop until the 6th century AD, as far as can be substantiated by evidence. But by the 6th century, sources attest to the offering of zongzi on the Double Fifth Festival (5th day of the 5th month of the lunar calendar) being connected with the figure of Qu Yuan.

As for the origin myth, a fable recounts that the people commemorated the drowning death of Qu Yuan on the Double Fifth day by casting rice stuffed in bamboo tubes; but the practice changed in the early Eastern Han dynasty (1st century AD), (Note: The first year of Eastern Han (Year 1 of Jianwu era, AD 25) to be more precise.) when the ghost of Qu Yuan appeared in a dream to a man named Ou Hui (Chinese: 區回, 歐回) and instructed him to seal the rice packet with chinaberry (or Melia) leaves and bind it with colored string, to repel the dragons (jiaolong) that would otherwise consume them. However, this fable is not attested in contemporary (Han period) literature, and only known to be recorded centuries later in Wu Jun (呉均; Wu chün, d. 520)'s Xu Qixieji (『續齊諧記』; Hsü-ch'ih-hsieh-chih). (Note: Chan (2009) citing Wu Jun Xu Qixie though not explicitly mentioning zong, only paraphrasing as "rice wrapped with five-colored strings".)

Also, Qu Yuan had (dubiously, by "folklore" or by common belief) become connected with the boat races held on the Double Fifth, datable by another 6th-century source. (Note: Jingchu Suishiji) 《荊楚歲時記》(6th c.), under the "Fifth Day of the Fifth Month" heading. Modern media has printed a version of the legend which says that the locals had rushed out in dragonboats to try retrieve his body and threw packets of rice into the river to distract the fish from eating the poet's body.

== History ==
Zongzi (sticky rice dumplings) are traditionally eaten during the Duanwu Festival (Double Fifth Festival) which falls on the fifth day of the fifth month of the Chinese lunisolar calendar, and commonly known as the "Dragon Boat Festival" in English. The festival falls each year on a day in late-May to mid-June in the International calendar.

The practice of eating zongzi on the Double Fifth or summer solstice is concretely documented in literature from around the late Han (2nd–3rd centuries). (Note: The claim that the zongzi dates to the Spring and Autumn period occurs in a book by a non-expert (Dong Qiang, a French literature professor and translator), and only an unnamed "Record" is cited as evidence. Other web sources concur with this claim.) At the end of the Eastern Han dynasty, people made zong, also called jiao shu, lit. "horned/angled millet") by wrapping sticky rice with the leaves of the Zizania latifolia plant (Chinese: 菰; pinyin: gu, a sort of wild rice) and boiling them in lye (grass-and-wood ash water). The name jiao shu may imply "ox-horn shape", or cone-shape. That the zong or ziao shu prepared in this way was eaten on the occasion of the Double Fifth (Duanwu) is documented in works as early as the Fengsu Tongyi, AD 195). These festive rice dumplings are also similarly described in General Zhou Chu (236–297)'s Fengtu Ji, "Record of Local Folkways" Various sources claim that this Fengtu Ji contains the first documented reference regarding zongzi, even though it dates somewhat later than the Fengsu Tongyi.

In the Jin dynasty (晋, AD 266–420), zongzi was officially a Dragon Boat Festival food. Anecdotally, an official called Lu Xun from the Jin dynasty once sent zongzi which used yizhiren (Chinese: 益智仁, the fruit of Alpinia oxyphylla or sharp leaf galangal) as additional filling; this type of dumpling was then dubbed yizhi zong (Chinese: 益智粽, literally "dumplings to increase wisdom"). Later in the Northern and Southern dynasties, mixed zongzi appeared, the rice was filled with fillings such as meat, chestnuts, jujubes, red beans, (Note: Actually, "chestnut and jujube dates" (Chinese: 栗棗) were already documented in the Fengsu Tongyi account of zong.) and they were exchanged as gifts to relatives and friends.

In the 6th century (Sui to early Tang dynasty), the dumpling is also being referred to as "tubular zong" (Chinese: 筒糉/筒粽; pinyin: tongzong), and they were being made by being packed inside "young bamboo" tubes. (Note: Jingchu Suishiji 《荊楚歲時記》(6th c.), under the "Summer Solstice" heading.) (Note: Here following Ian Chapman who renders (tong zong) as "tubular zong".) The 6th century source for this states that the dumplings were eaten on the Summer Solstice, (instead of the Double Fifth).

In the Tang dynasty, the shape of zongzi appeared conical and diamond-shaped, and the rice which was used to make zongzi was as white as jade. Datang zongzi (i.e. the zongzi eaten in Tang Imperial period) was also recorded in some classical-era Japanese literature, which was heavily influenced by Tang Chinese culture.

In the Northern Song dynasty period, the "New augmentation to the Shuowen Jiezi" (Chinese: 説文新附; pinyin: Shouwen xinfu) glossed zong as rice with reed leaves wrapped around it. (Note: The original Shuowen Jiezi dates to c. AD 100, but this character was added to the dictionary in the 10th century. The leaf plant is given as lu (simplified Chinese: 芦; traditional Chinese: 蘆; pinyin: lu), or "reed".) Mijiian Zong (zongzi with glacé fruit) was also popular in the Song dynasty. Also during the Song dynasty, there were many preserved fruit zongzi. At this time also appeared a pavilion filled with zongzi for advertising, which showed that eating zongzi in the Song dynasty had been very fashionable.

In the Yuan and Ming dynasties, the wrapping material had changed from gu (wild rice) leaf to ruo (箬; the Indocalamus tessellatus bamboo) leaf, and then to reed leaves, and filled with materials like bean paste, pine nut kernel, pork, walnut, jujube, and so on. The varieties of zongzi were more diverse.

During the Ming and Qing dynasties, zongzi became auspicious food. At that time, scholars who took the imperial examinations would eat "pen zongzi", which was specially given to them at home, before going to the examination hall. Because it looked long and thin like a writing brush, the pronunciation of "pen zongzi" is similar to the Chinese word for "pass", which was for good omen. Ham zongzi appeared in the Qing dynasty.

Every year in early May of the lunar calendar, the Chinese people still soak glutinous rice, wash the leaves and wrap up zongzi.

== Description ==
Video of zongzi being made in Hainan, China

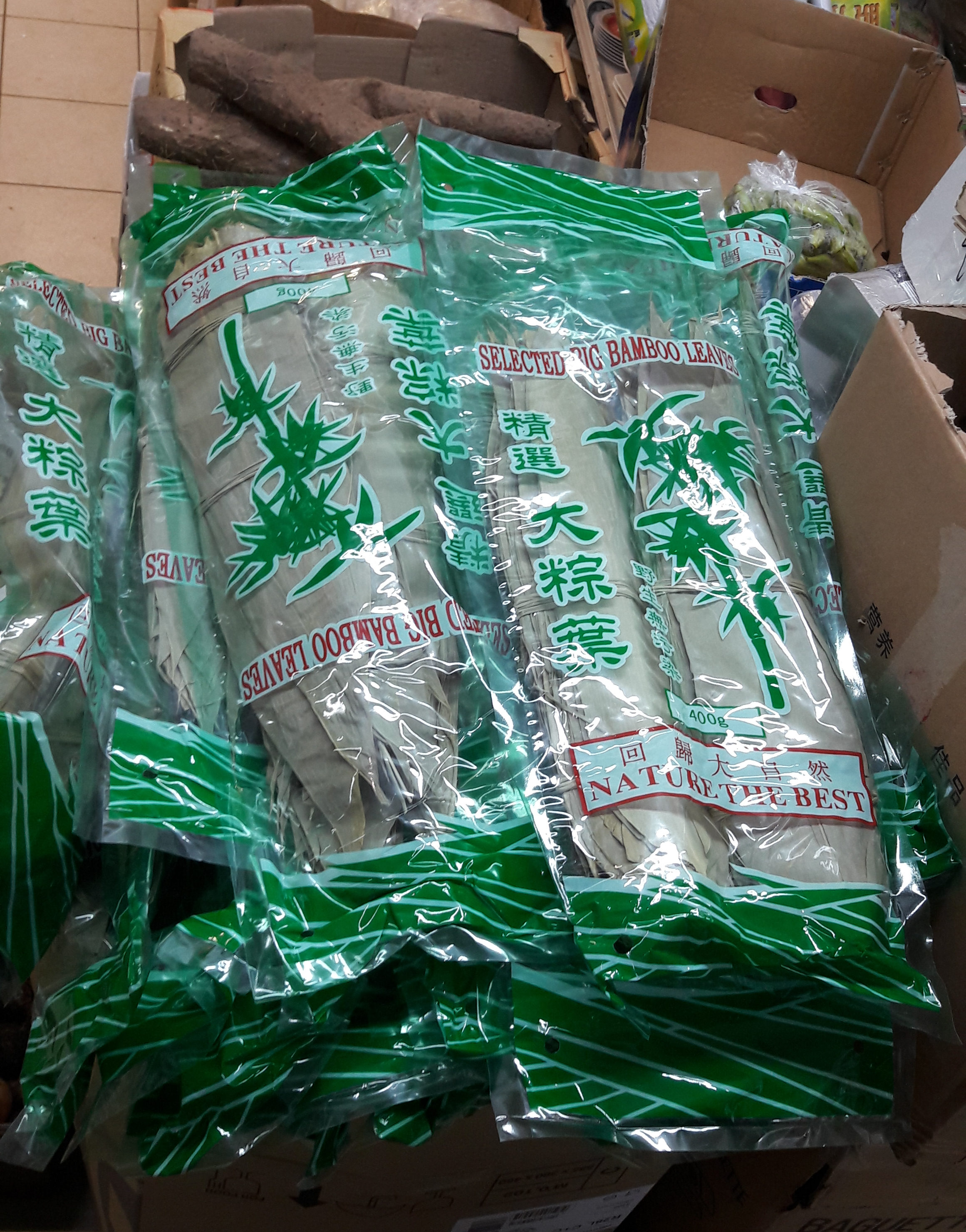
Prepackaged dried bamboo leaves for making zongzi

The shapes of zongzi vary, and range from being approximately tetrahedral in southern China to an elongated cone in northern China. In the Chiang Kai-shek Memorial Hall in Taipei, plastic mock-ups of rectangular zongzi are displayed as an example of the zongzi eaten by Chiang Kai-shek. Wrapping zongzi neatly is a skill that is passed down through families, as are the recipes. Making zongzi is traditionally a family event in which everyone helps out.

While traditional zongzi are wrapped in bamboo leaves, the leaves of lotus, reed, maize, banana, canna, shell ginger, and pandan sometimes are used as substitutes in other countries. Each kind of leaf imparts its own unique aroma and flavor to the rice.

The fillings used for zongzi vary from region to region, but the rice used is almost always glutinous rice (also called "sticky rice" or "sweet rice"). Depending on the region, the rice may be lightly precooked by stir-frying or soaked in water before using. In the north, fillings are mostly red bean paste and tapioca or taro. Northern style zongzi tend to be sweet and dessert-like. In the northern region of China, zongzi filled with jujubes are popular.

Southern-style zongzi, however, tend to be more savoury or salty. Fillings of Southern-style zongzi include ham, salted duck egg, pork belly, taro, shredded pork or chicken, Chinese sausage, pork fat, and shiitake mushrooms. However, as the variations of zongzi styles have traveled and become mixed, today one can find all kinds of them at traditional markets, and their types are not confined to which side of the Yellow River they originated from.

Zongzi need to be steamed or boiled for several hours depending on how the rice is prepared prior to being added, along with the fillings. With the advent of modern food processing, pre-cooked zongzi (usually in vacuum packs or frozen) are now available.

=== Fillings ===
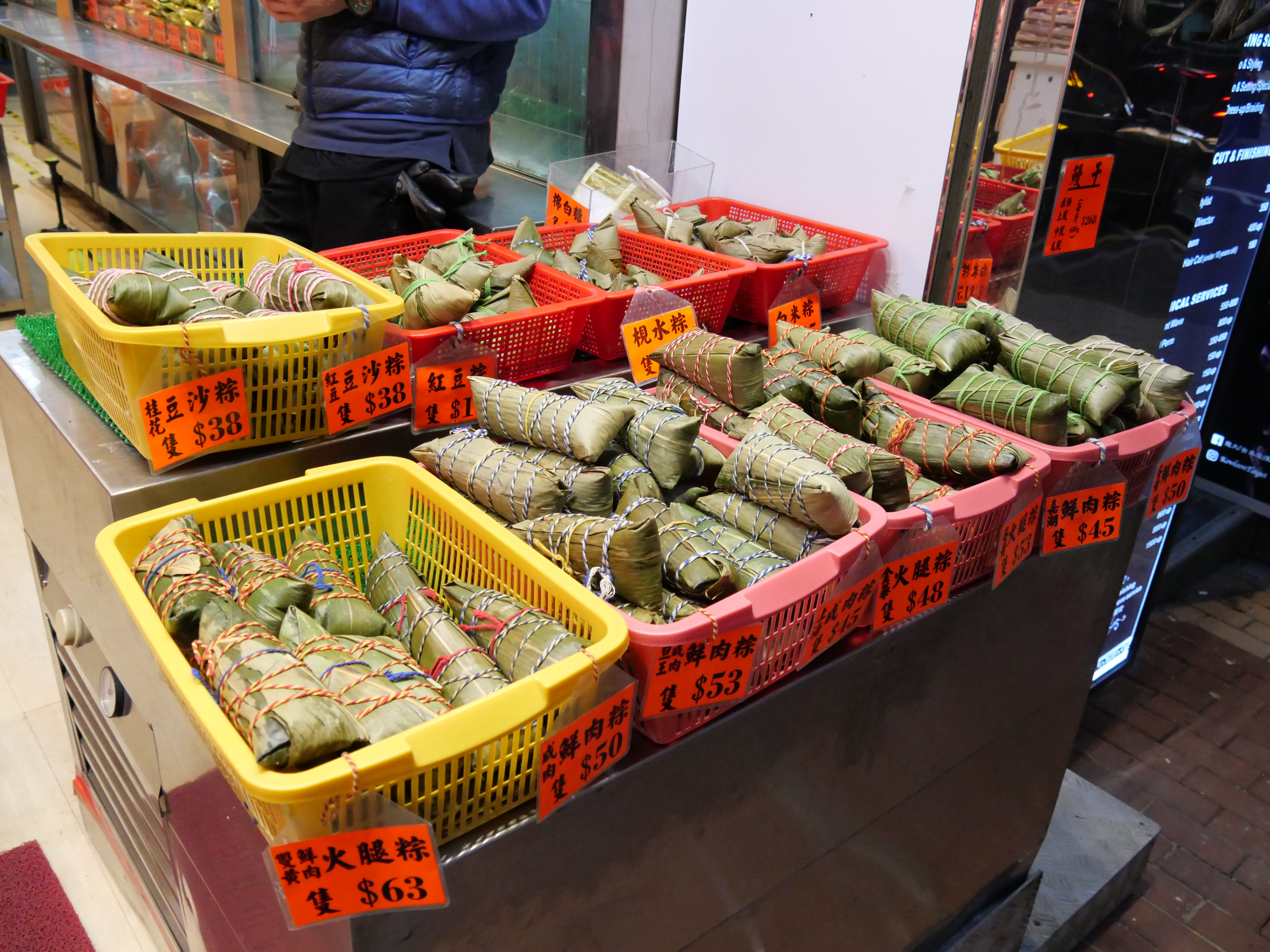
When offered for sale at the same time, zongzi with different fillings may be identified by shape, size, or colored string.

Sweet:

- White sugar (mixed into rice, frequently present)
- Mung beans, split and dehulled
- Red bean paste
- Lotus seed
- Yam
- Jujube

Salty or savory:

- Soy sauce (mixed into rice, almost always present)
- Chinese sausage
- Mushrooms, preferably xiang gu
- Salted duck egg yolks, or hard-boiled eggs
- Pork, such as ham and/or pork belly
- Conpoy (dried scallops)
- Red-cooked meats
- Chicken

Either or neutral:

- Nuts
- Water chestnuts
- Cooked peanuts
- Vegetables
- Meat floss

== Variations ==
=== Mainland China ===
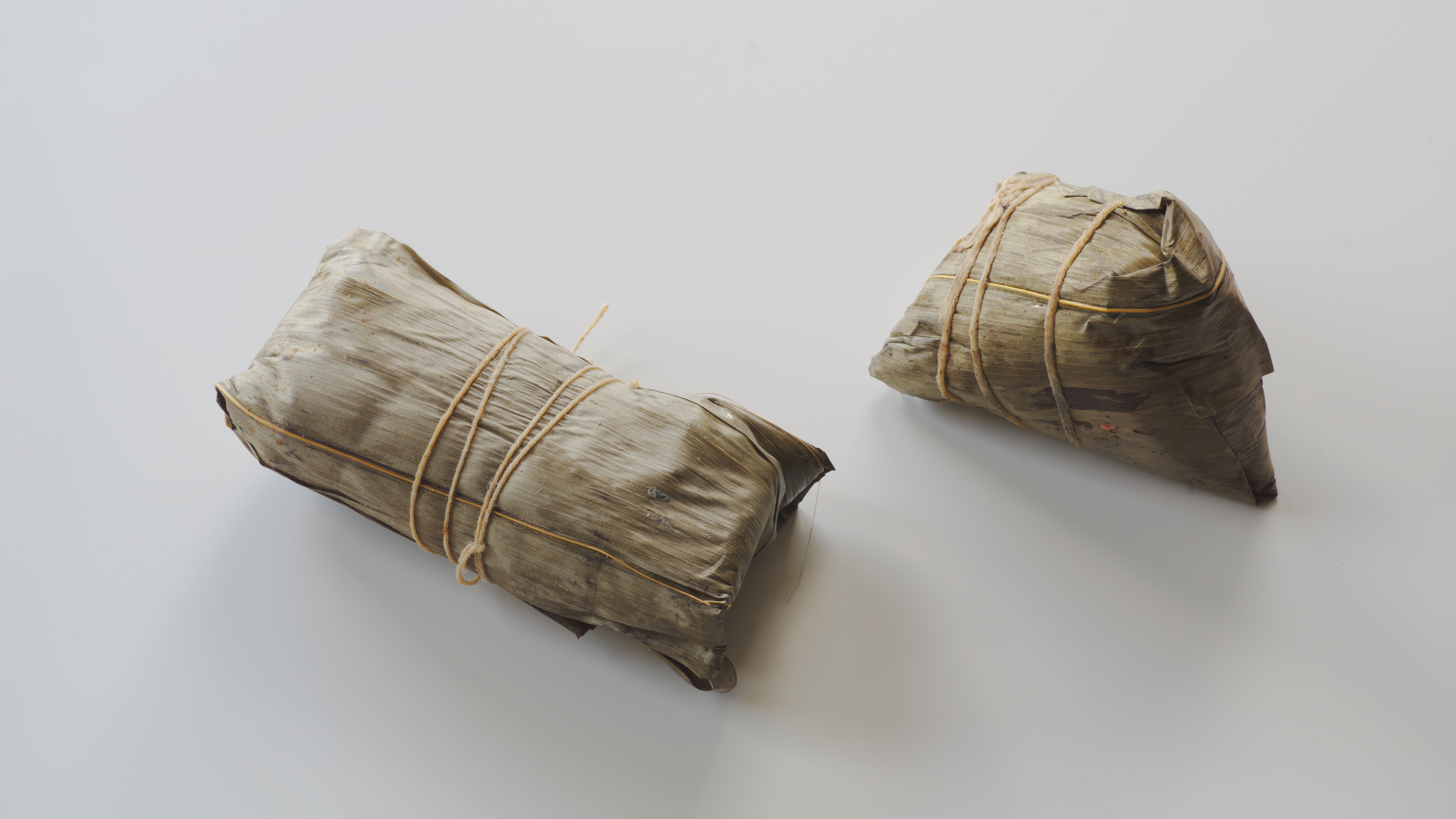
Southern and Northern Chinese style zongzi

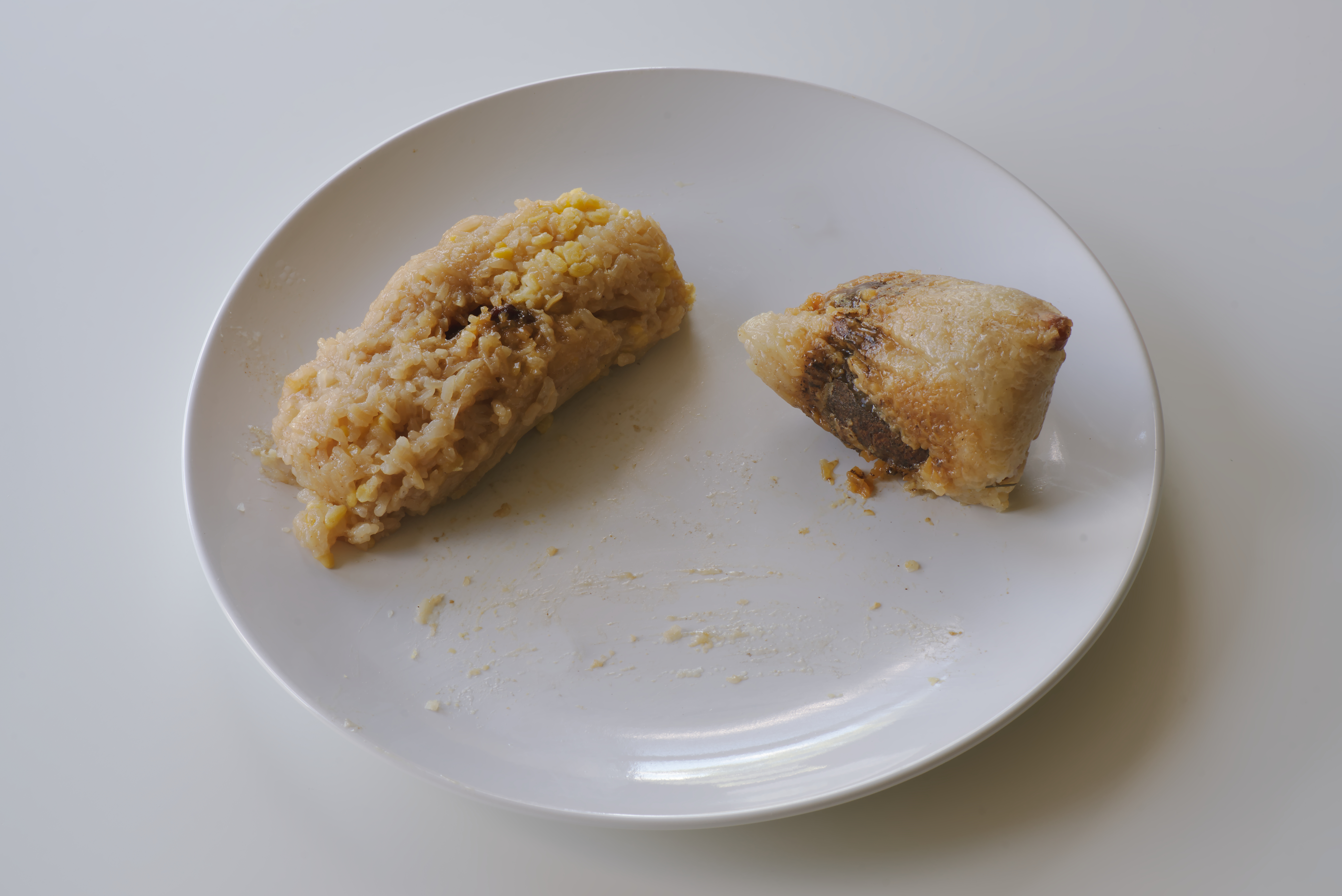
Unwrapped zongzi with pork and mung beans (left), pork and peanuts (right)

- Jiaxing zongzi (嘉興粽子): This is a kind of zongzi famous in mainland China and named after the city Jiaxing, Zhejiang. Typically savory with the rice mixed with soy sauce and having pork, chestnut and salted duck egg yolk as its filling, but sweet ones with mung bean or red bean filling also exist.
- Jia zong (假粽): Instead of glutinous rice, balls of glutinous rice flour (so no individual grains of rice are discernible) are used to enclose the fillings of the zongzi. These "fake zong" are typically smaller than most and are much stickier.
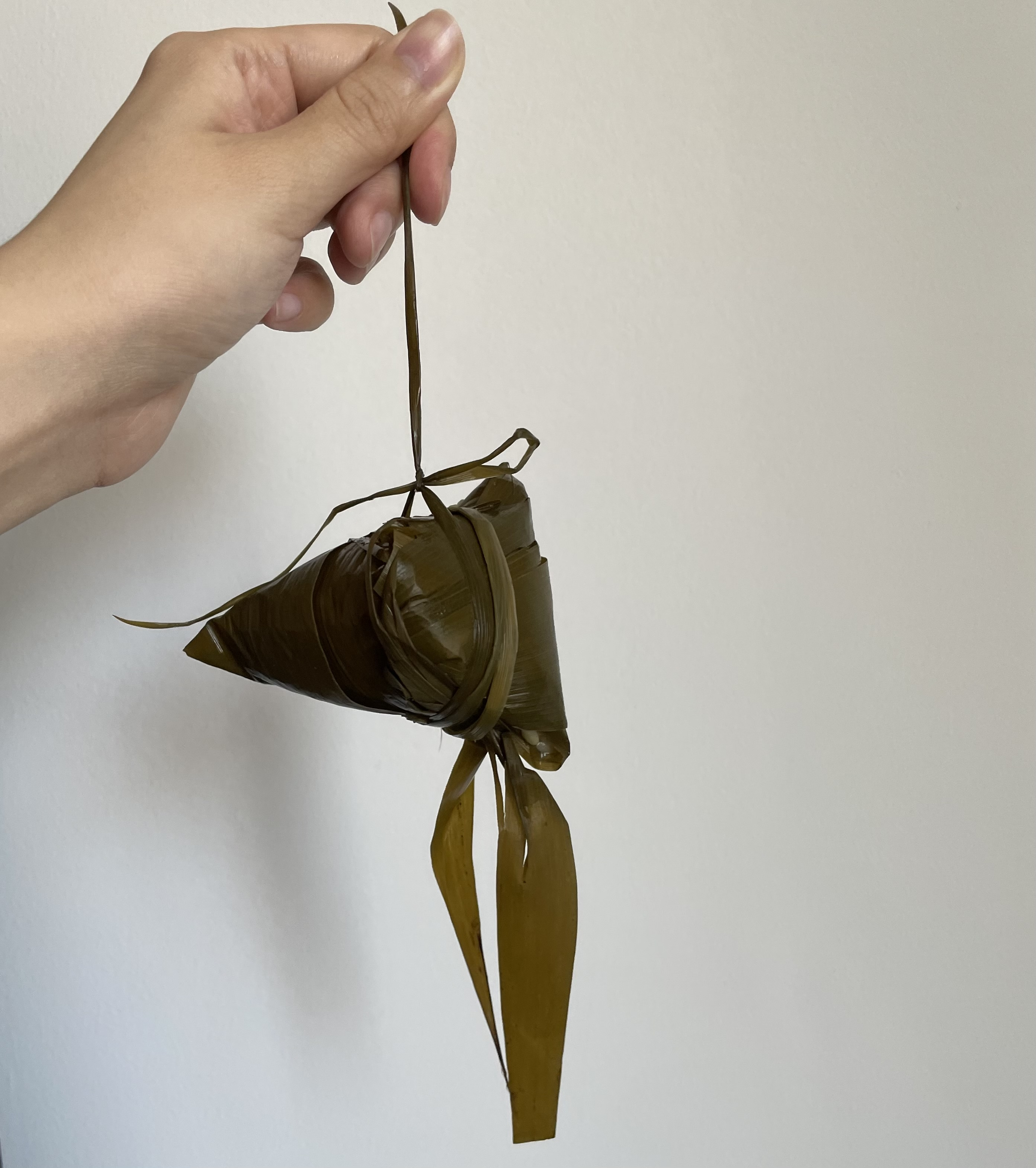
- Northwestern style zongzi
  Jianshui zong (碱水粽): These "alkaline water zong" are typically eaten as a dessert item rather than as part of the main meal. The glutinous rice is treated with jianzongshui (碱粽水, alkali[ne] zongzi water, aqueous sodium carbonate or potassium carbonate), giving them their distinctive yellow color. Jianshui zong typically contain either no filling or are filled with a sweet mixture, such as sweet bean paste. Sometimes, a certain redwood sliver (蘇木) is inserted for color and flavor. They are often eaten with sugar or light syrup.
- Cantonese jung (廣東糉): This is representative of the southern variety of zongzi, usually consisting of marinated meat, such as pork belly, and duck, with other ingredients like mung bean paste, mushrooms, dried scallops, and salted egg yolk. Cantonese jung are small, the front is square, back has a raised sharp angle, shaped like an awl.
- Chiu Chou jung (潮州粽): This is a variation of Cantonese jung with red bean paste, pork belly, chestnut, mushroom, and dried shrimp, in a triangular prism.
- Banlam zang (閩南粽): Xiamen, Quanzhou area is very famous for its pork rice dumplings, made with braised pork with pork belly, plus mushrooms, shrimp, and so on.
- Sichuan zong (四川粽): Sichuan peppercorns, chili powder, Sichuan salt, and preserved pork are wrapped into four-cornered dumplings, which are cooked and then roasted.
- Beijing zong (北京粽): The Beijing zong are sweet and often eaten cold. Common fillings include red dates and bean paste, as well as preserved fruit.
- Shanxi zong (山西粽): In Shanxi, zongzi are often made with yellow glutinous millet or sticky yellow rice instead of the more commonly used white glutinous rice. Typical fillings include red dates or sweetened red beans. The resulting texture is notably chewy and dense, offering a distinctively hearty flavor.

=== Taiwan ===
- Taiwanese zongzi are regionally split by the process of cooking rather than filling.
  - Northern Taiwanese zongzi (北部粽) are wrapped with husks of Phyllostachys makinoi bamboo (桂竹籜), then steamed.
  - Southern Taiwanese zongzi (南部粽) are wrapped with leaves of Bambusa oldhamii (麻竹葉), then boiled.
- The filling is classified simply by eating habits:
  - Vegetarian zongzi in Taiwan is made with dry peanut flakes.
  - The meat-filled zongzi in Taiwan is made with fresh pork, chicken, duck, egg yolk, mushroom, dried shrimps, or fried scallions.

=== Japan ===
- Japanese chimaki are very similar to the Chinese versions using various species of the bamboo Sasa but possibly with different fillings, and are divided into savory and sweet types.
- A special sweet chimaki is eaten on Children's Day (kodomo no hi, May 5), and is identifiable by its long narrow conical shape.

=== Mauritius ===
- Sweet zong is a zongzi made of a plain rice (i.e. without any fillings) which is eaten with crushed peanut in sugar.
- Salty zong contains meat, beans and other fillings in the rice.

=== Malaysia and Singapore ===
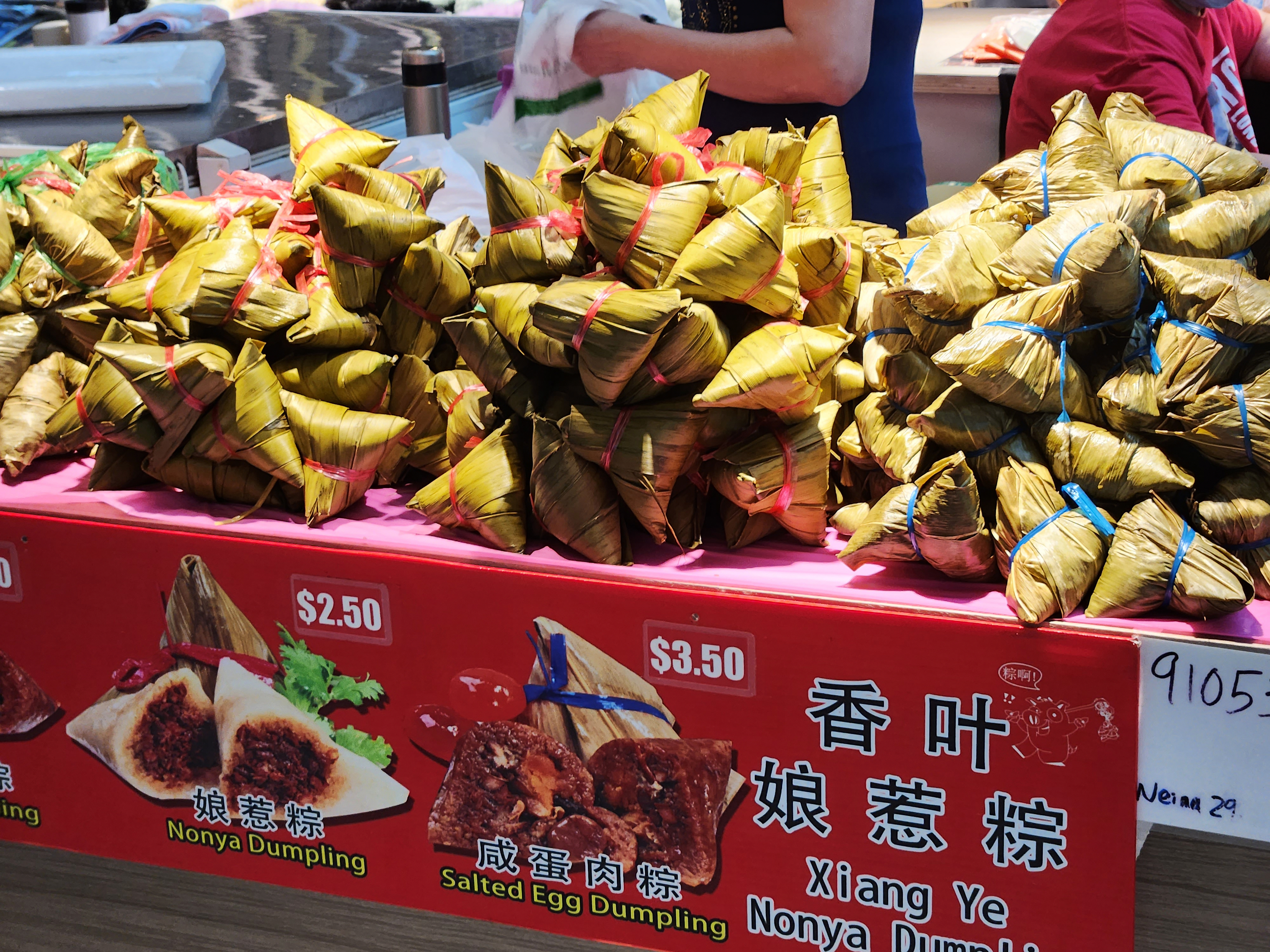
- Nyonya Chang on sale in Singapore.
  Nyonya chang (娘惹粽): A specialty of Peranakan cuisine, these zongzi are made similarly to those from southern China. However, pandan leaves are often used, in addition to bamboo leaves, for the wrapping while minced pork with candied winter melon, a spice mix, and sometimes ground roasted peanuts are used as the fillings. As with a common practice found in Peranakan pastries, part of the rice on these zongzi are often dyed blue with the extract from blue pea flower to add to the aesthetic.

== Museum ==
The Jiaxing Zongzi Culture Museum in Jiaxing, China has exhibits of the cultural history and various styles of zongzi.

== Gallery ==
Variations of zongzi

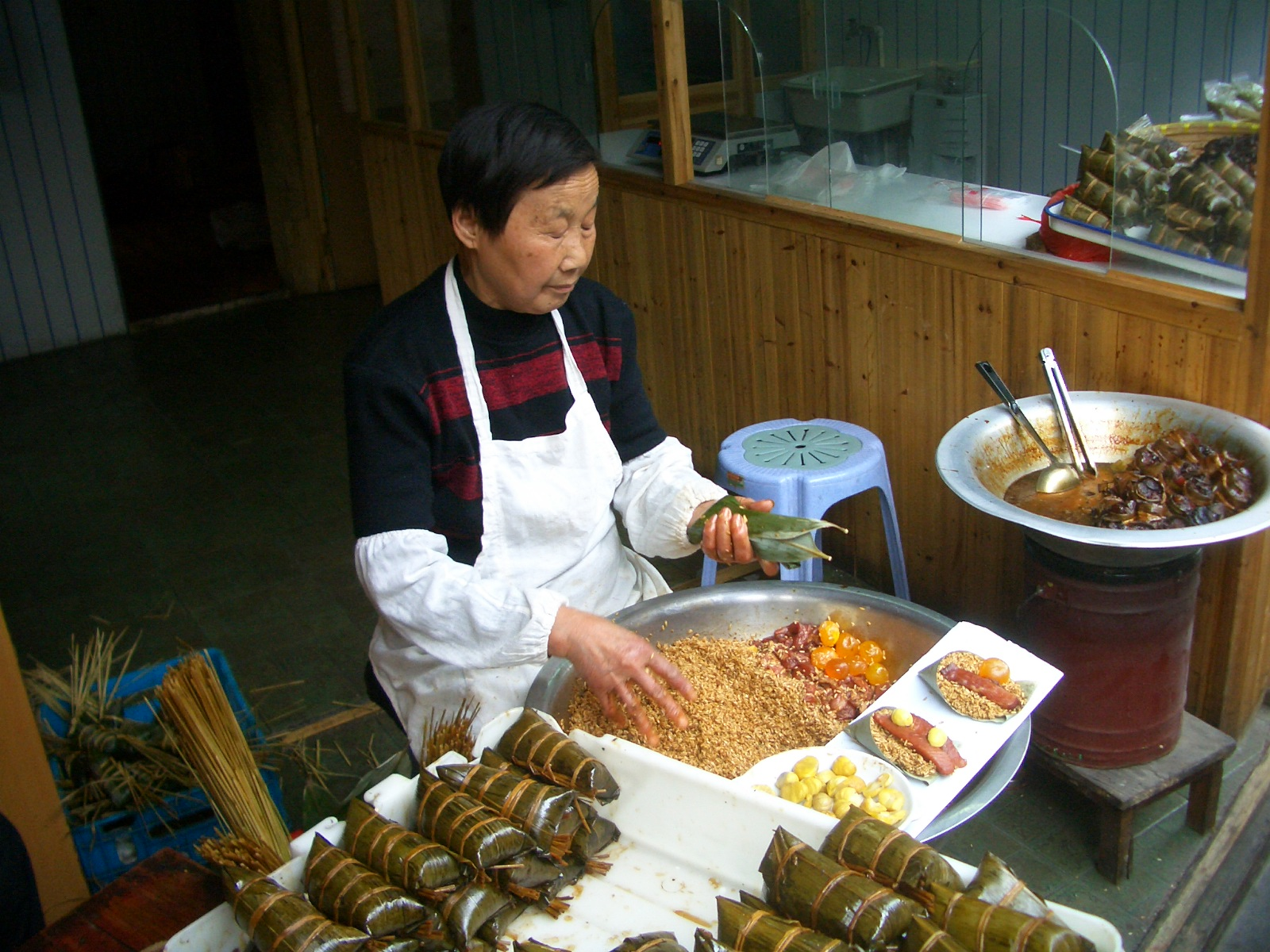
Zongzi assembly in Shanghai

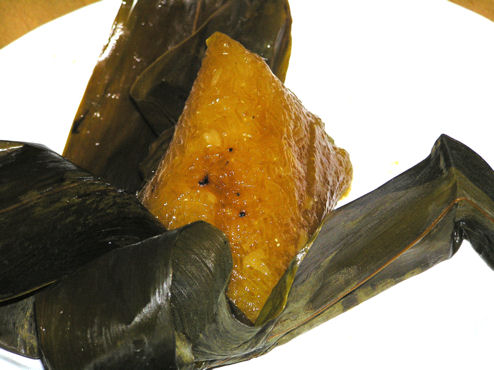
Jianshui zongzi without fillings

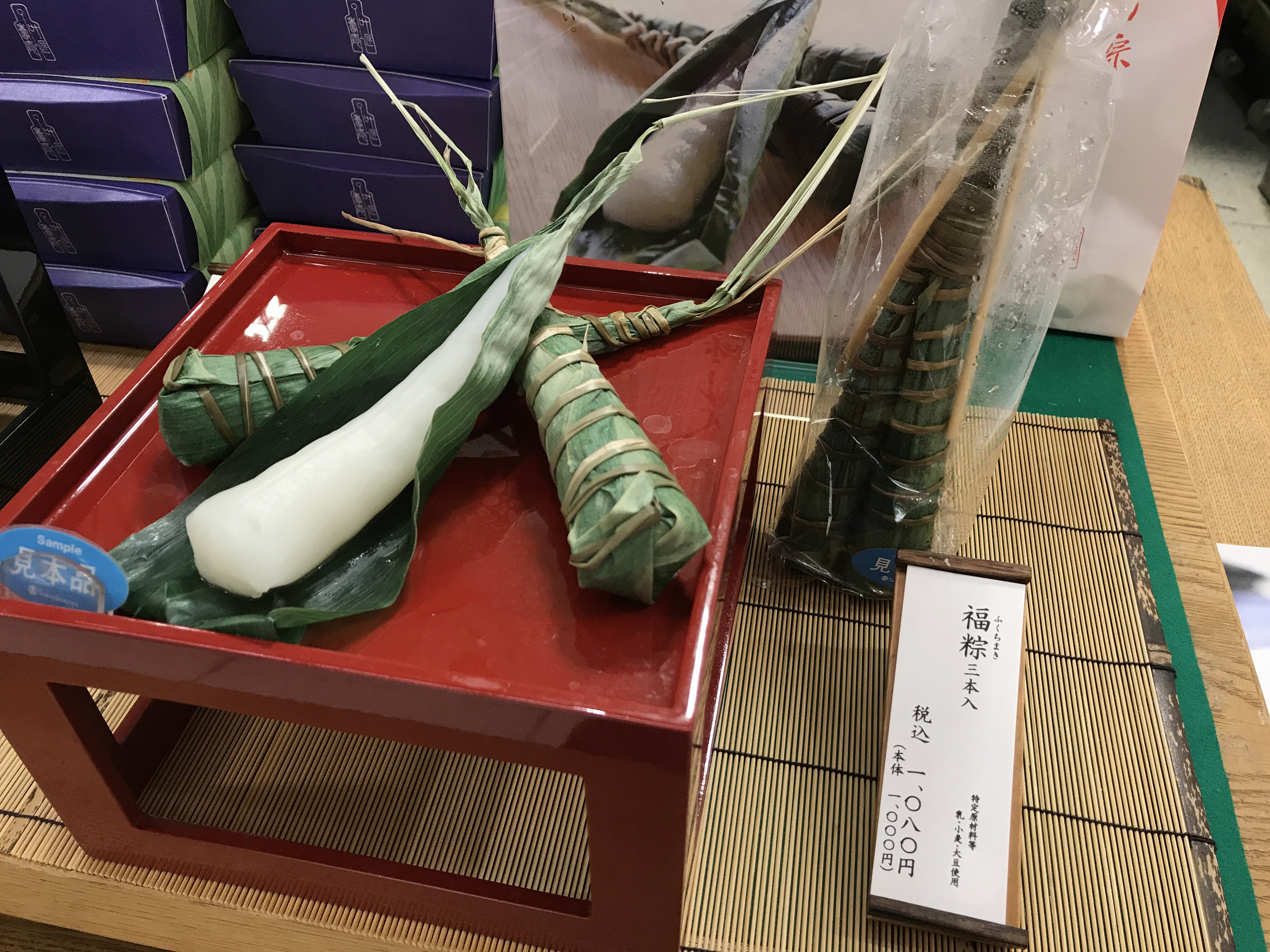
Japanese-style chimaki may have a long narrow conical shape

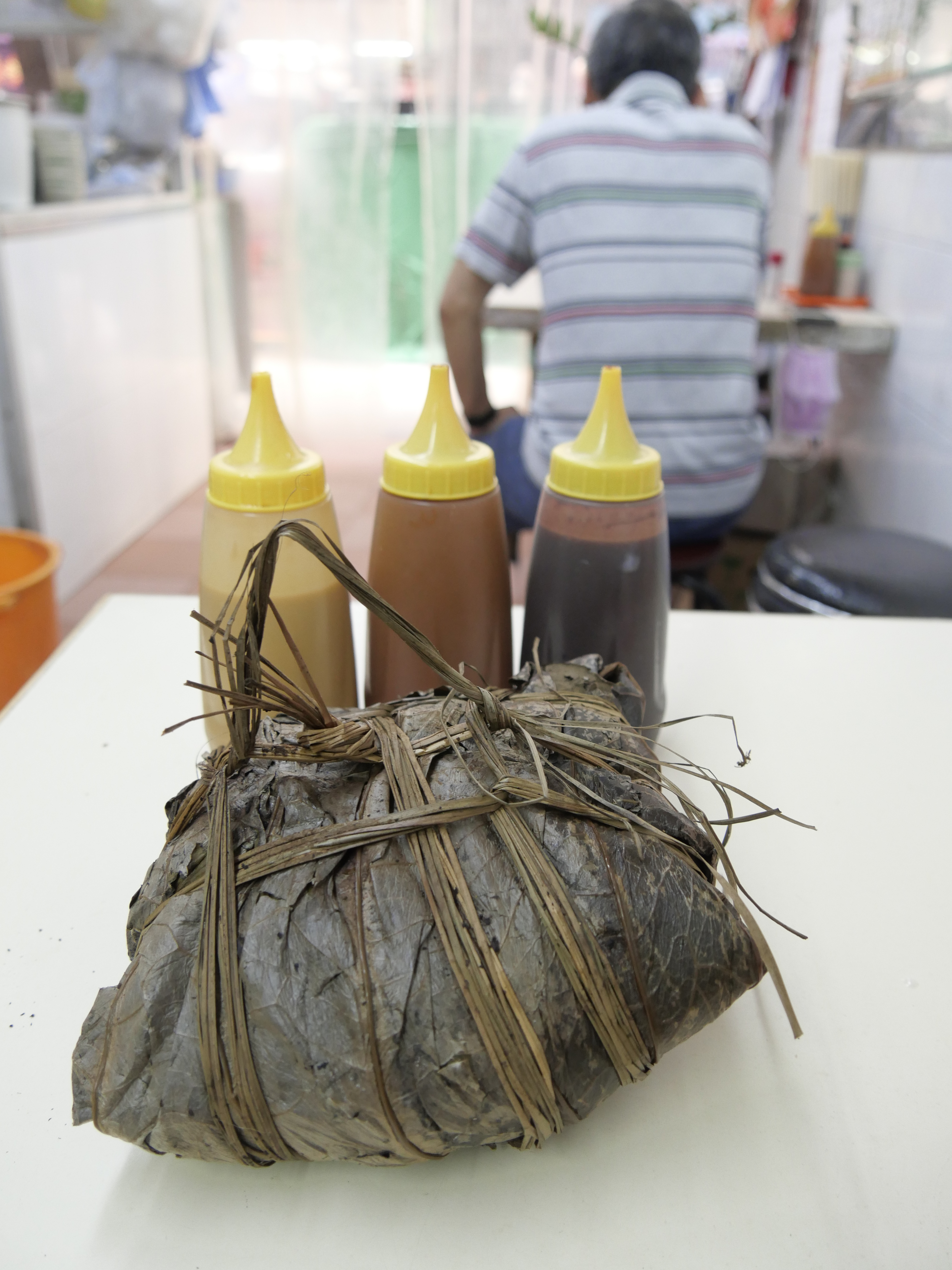
A very large zongzi

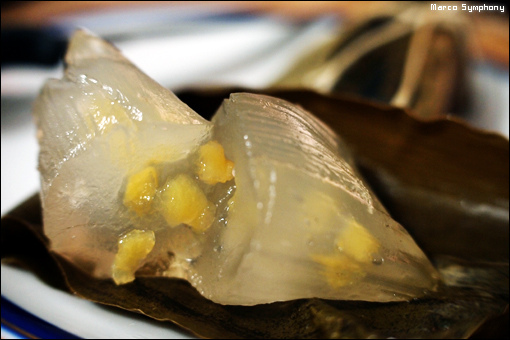
Dessert zongzi made with translucent glutinous rice paste

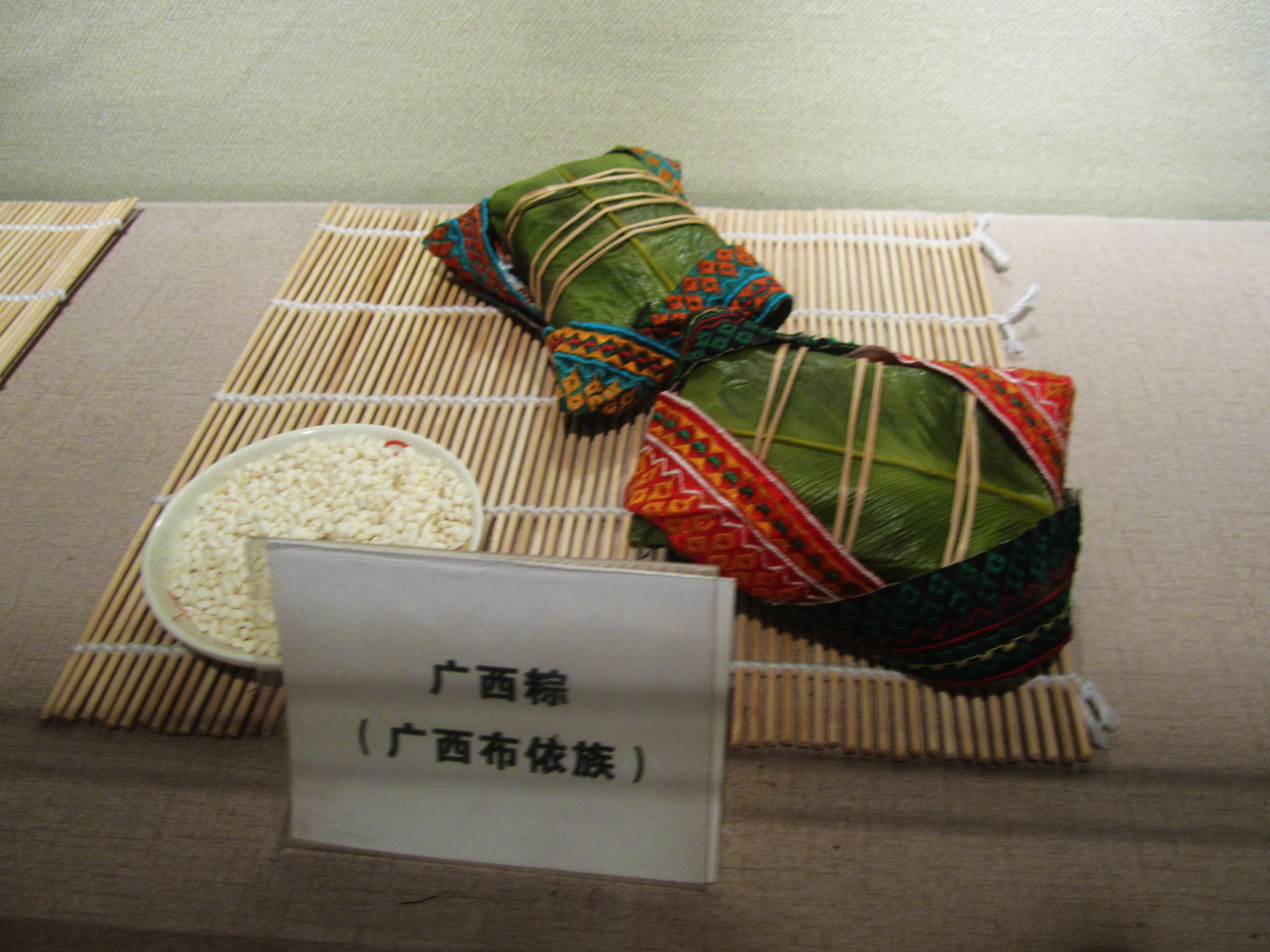
Fancy decorated zongzi in a museum display

== See also ==
- Bánh lá
- Bánh chưng
- Bánh tét
- Lo mai gai, or lotus leaf wrap
- Chinese sticky rice
- Corunda
- Chunga pitha
- Ketupat
- Lontong
- Onigiri
- Suman
- Salted duck egg, another food eaten in the Dragon Boat Festival
- Tamale, another food wrapped in leaves and steamed
