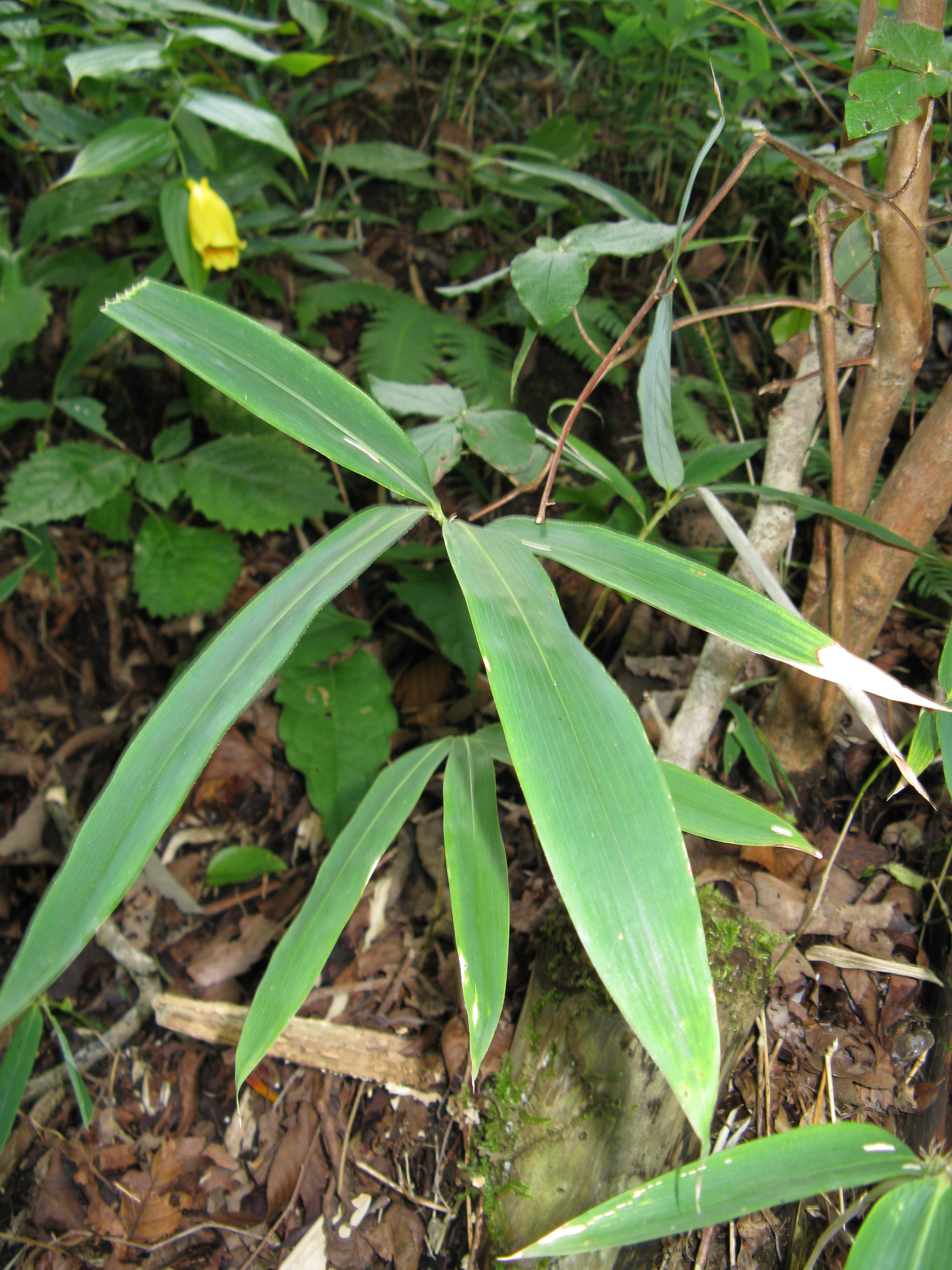

Scientific classification
- Kingdom: Plantae
- Clade: Tracheophytes
- Clade: Angiosperms
- Clade: Monocots
- Clade: Commelinids
- Order: Poales
- Family: Poaceae
- Genus: Sasa
- Species: S. nipponica

Binomial name
- Sasa nipponica (Makino) Makino & Shibata

Synonyms
- Homotypic Synonyms: Arundinaria nipponica (Makino) Makino; Bambusa nipponica Makino; Heterotypic Synonyms: Arundinaria bungoensis Nakai; Arundinaria koboi Nakai; Neosasamorpha elegans (Makino) Koidz.; Sasa asoensis Nakai; Sasa bicolor Koidz.; Sasa elegans Makino; Sasa hatenashiensis Koidz.; Sasa hikosanensis Makino & Koidz.; Sasa hiyeiana Koidz.; Sasa igaensis Nakai; Sasa iyoensis Nakai; Sasa kumaensis Koidz.; Sasa kumasoana Koidz.; Sasa kuntaensis Koidz.; Sasa lokkomontana Koidz.; Sasa maculata Nakai; Sasa maculata var. abei Sad.Suzuki; Sasa mikawana Koidz.; Sasa nagasei Sad.Suzuki; Sasa nagasei f. pilosa Sad.Suzuki; Sasa nandaiensis Koidz.; Sasa neotenuissima Koidz.; Sasa nipponica var. asoensis (Nakai) Sad.Suzuki; Sasa nipponica var. bicolor (Koidz.) Sad.Suzuki; Sasa nipponica var. mikawana (Koidz.) Sad.Suzuki; Sasa nipponica var. nandaiensis (Koidz.) Sad.Suzuki; Sasa nipponica var. pycnotricha (Koidz.) Sad.Suzuki; Sasa nunobikiensis Koidz.; Sasa ohminensis Makino & Koidz.; Sasa pycnotricha Koidz.; Sasa sacrosancta Koidz.; Sasa sambiensis Koidz.; Sasa scaberula Makino & Koidz.; Sasa tashiroi Koidz.; Sasa tenuissima Makino & Nakai; Sasa tomodensis Nakai; Sasa ureneiana Koidz.; Sasa yoigana Koidz.; Sasaella bungoensis (Nakai) Koidz.; Sasaella koboi (Nakai) Koidz.

= Sasa nipponica =

Species of grass

Sasa nipponica is a species of flowering plant in the family Poaceae. It is native to Japan.
