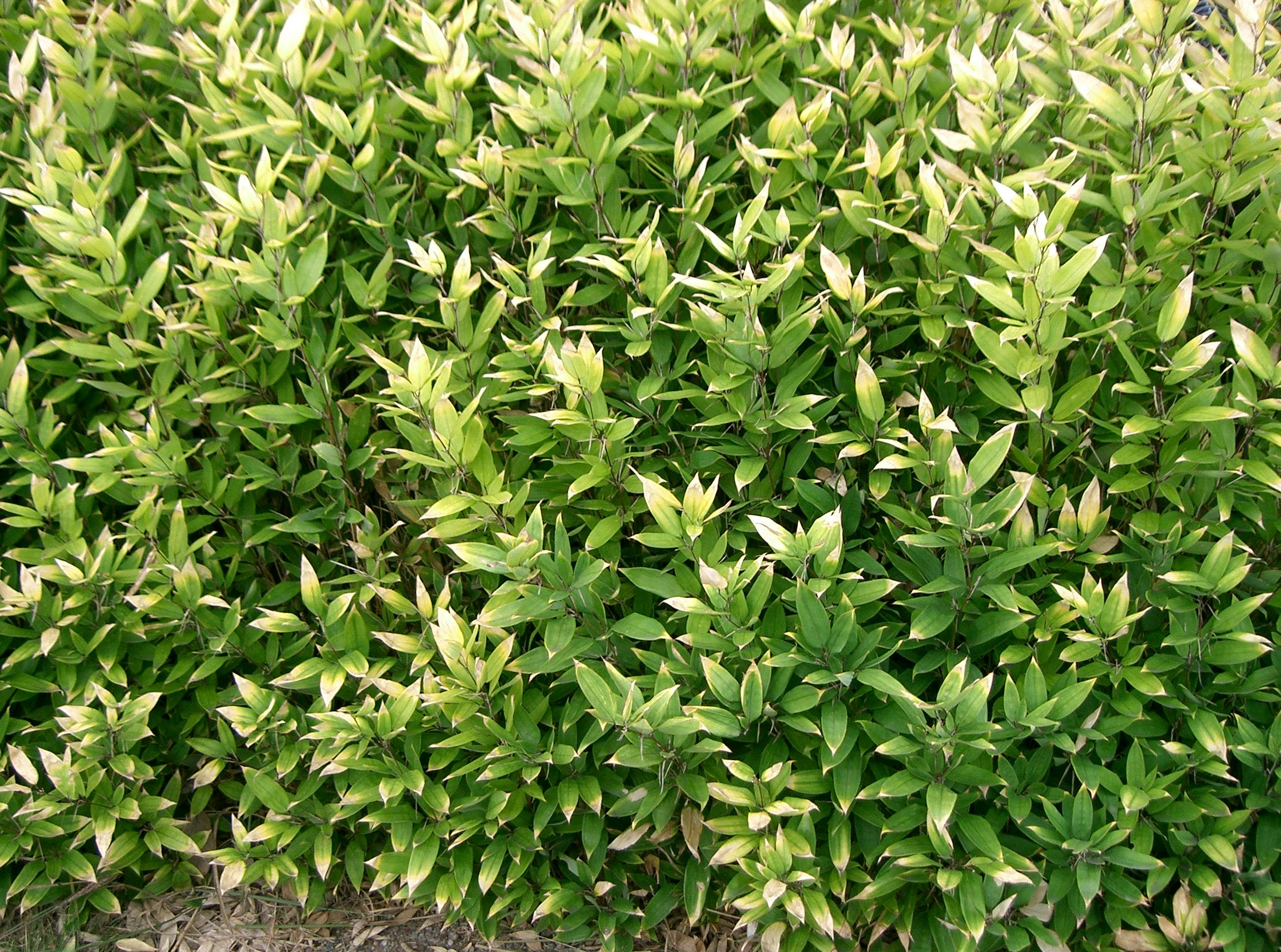

Scientific classification
- Kingdom: Plantae
- Clade: Tracheophytes
- Clade: Angiosperms
- Clade: Monocots
- Clade: Commelinids
- Order: Poales
- Family: Poaceae
- Genus: Shibataea
- Species: S. kumasaca

Binomial name
- Shibataea kumasaca (Zoll. ex Steud.) Makino ex Nakai

Synonyms
- Shibataea kumasasa alternate spelling; Bambusa kumasasa Zoll. ex Steud.; Arundinaria kumasasa (Zoll. ex Steud.) Kurz; Phyllostachys kumasasa (Zoll. ex Steud.) Munro; Bambusa aureostriata Regel; Arundarbor aureostriata (Regel) Kuntze; Phyllostachys ruscifolia Satow; Sasa aureostriata (Regel) E.G.Camus; Shibataea pygmaea F.Maek.; Shibataea tumidinoda T.H.Wen

= Shibataea kumasaca =

Species of grass

Shibataea kumasaca (倭竹), the ruscus-leaf bamboo or ruscus bamboo, is a species of flowering plant in the grass family, native to mountain slopes in Fujian and Zhejiang provinces in China, and widely cultivated elsewhere. Growing to 1.5 m (4.9 ft) tall, it is a compact, clump-forming evergreen bamboo.

In the UK it has gained the Royal Horticultural Society's Award of Garden Merit. As with other cultivated bamboos it can become invasive in favourable conditions, via its creeping rootstock.

== Japanese synonym ==
Two groups around the world have different beliefs about the correct name of this species. Some cite Japanese origins with the correct name being Shibataea kumasasa. Another group refers to it as Shibataea kumasaca, the Latinized name. Taxonomic authorities have yet to settle the issue.
