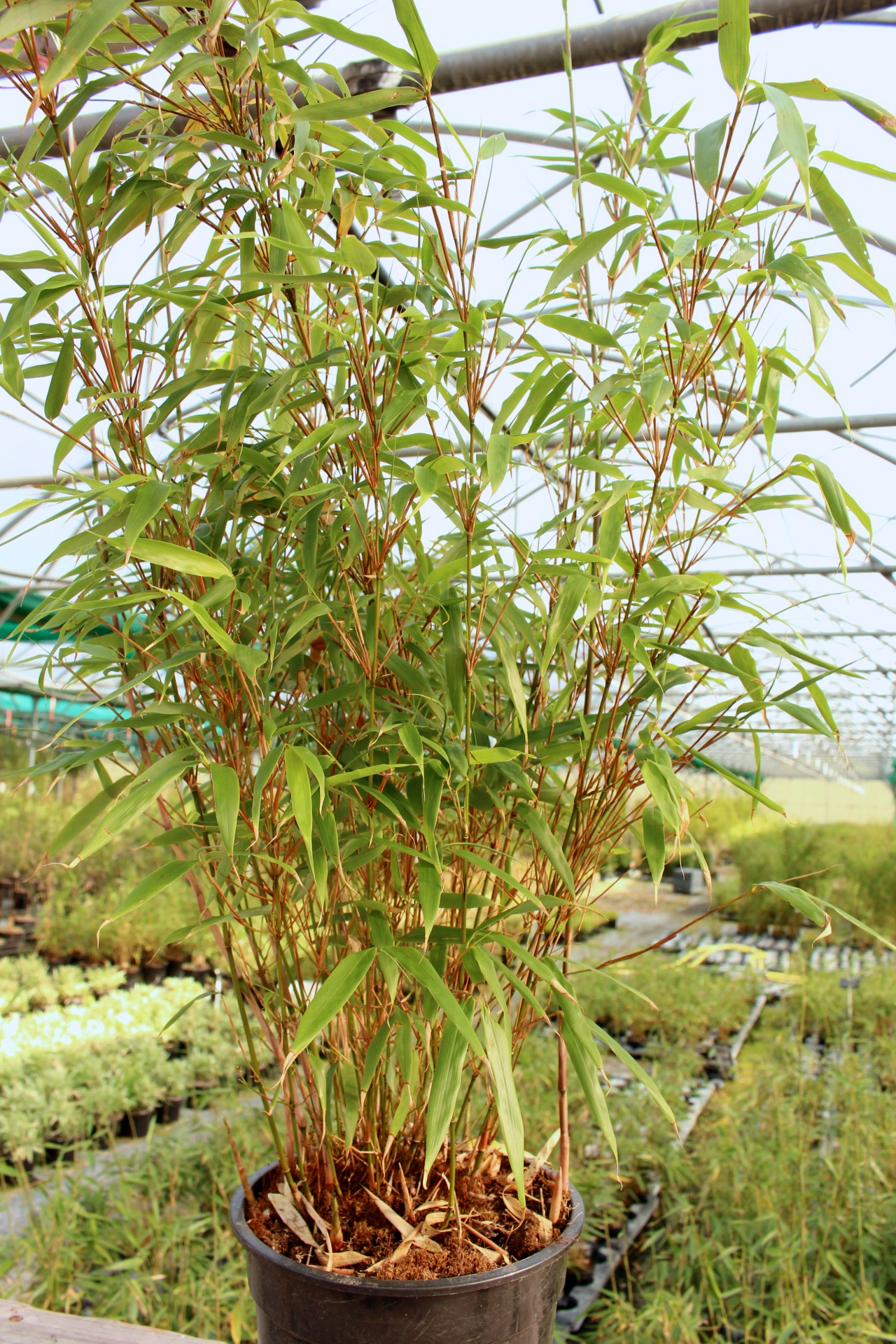

Scientific classification
- Kingdom: Plantae
- Clade: Tracheophytes
- Clade: Angiosperms
- Clade: Monocots
- Clade: Commelinids
- Order: Poales
- Family: Poaceae
- Genus: Fargesia
- Species: F. rufa

Binomial name
- Fargesia rufa T.P.Yi 1985

= Fargesia rufa =

Species of grass

Fargesia rufa is a woody bamboo native to western China. It is known in Chinese as qingchuan jianzhu (Chinese: 青川箭竹; pinyin: qīngchuānjiǎnzhú), meaning "Qingchuan Fargesia", Qingchuan being a county within the prefecture-level city of Guangyuan in the north of Sichuan. It is found at high elevations in the north of this province as well is in the south of Gansu. The plant is a significant source of food for the giant panda.

== Cultivation ==
F. rufa is commonly used as an ornamental plant outside of its natural range due to its compact habit and hardiness. Like all other species of the genus Fargesia, F. rufa displays a non-invasive clumping habit. Compared to F. murielae and F. nitida, F. rufa has twice the growth rate and responds faster to damage inflicted by herbivores and or the environment. It is propagated chiefly by division of the rhizome.
