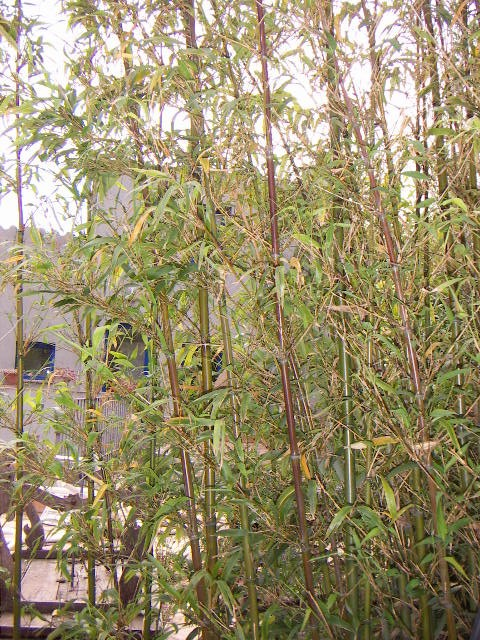
- Semiarundinaria fastuosa

Scientific classification
- Kingdom: Plantae
- Clade: Tracheophytes
- Clade: Angiosperms
- Clade: Monocots
- Clade: Commelinids
- Order: Poales
- Family: Poaceae
- Subfamily: Bambusoideae
- Tribe: Arundinarieae
- Subtribe: Arundinariinae
- Genus: Semiarundinaria; Makino

Type species
- Semiarundinaria fastuosa (Mitford) Makino ex Nakai

Synonyms
- Brachystachyum Keng

= Semiarundinaria =

Genus of grasses

Semiarundinaria is a genus of East Asian bamboo in the grass family.

Semiarundinaria is native to temperate and subtropical woodland in China and Japan. The plants are generally rhizomatous, tall and erect bamboos with cylindrical stems, producing tufts of lanceolate leaves at each node.

Species

1. Semiarundinaria densiflora - Anhui, Guangdong, Hubei, Jiangsu, Jiangxi, Zhejiang
2. Semiarundinaria fastuosa - Honshu; cultivated in China
3. Semiarundinaria fortis - Kyushu
4. Semiarundinaria kagamiana - Honshu
5. Semiarundinaria shapoensis - Hainan
6. Semiarundinaria sinica - Jiangsu, Zhejiang
7. Semiarundinaria yashadake - Japan

Formerly included

see Acidosasa Chimonocalamus Fargesia Oligostachyum × Phyllosasa Sasaella Sinobambusa Yushania

- Semiarundinaria bicorniculata - Chimonocalamus pallens
- Semiarundinaria elegantissima - Sasaella hidaensis
- Semiarundinaria farinosa - Sinobambusa farinosa
- Semiarundinaria gracilipes - Oligostachyum gracilipes
- Semiarundinaria henryi - Sinobambusa henryi
- Semiarundinaria lima - Oligostachyum nuspiculum
- Semiarundinaria lubrica - Oligostachyum lubricum
- Semiarundinaria nitida - Fargesia nitida
- Semiarundinaria nuspicula - Oligostachyum nuspiculum
- Semiarundinaria okuboi - Sinobambusa tootsik
- Semiarundinaria pantlingii - Yushania pantlingii
- Semiarundinaria pubens - Sinobambusa tootsik
- Semiarundinaria sat - Sinobambusa sat
- Semiarundinaria scabriflora - Oligostachyum scabriflorum
- Semiarundinaria scopula - Oligostachyum scopulum
- Semiarundinaria tenuifolia - Sinobambusa tootsik
- Semiarundinaria tootsik - Sinobambusa tootsik
- Semiarundinaria × tranquillans - × Phyllosasa tranquillans
- Semiarundinaria venusta - Acidosasa venusta
