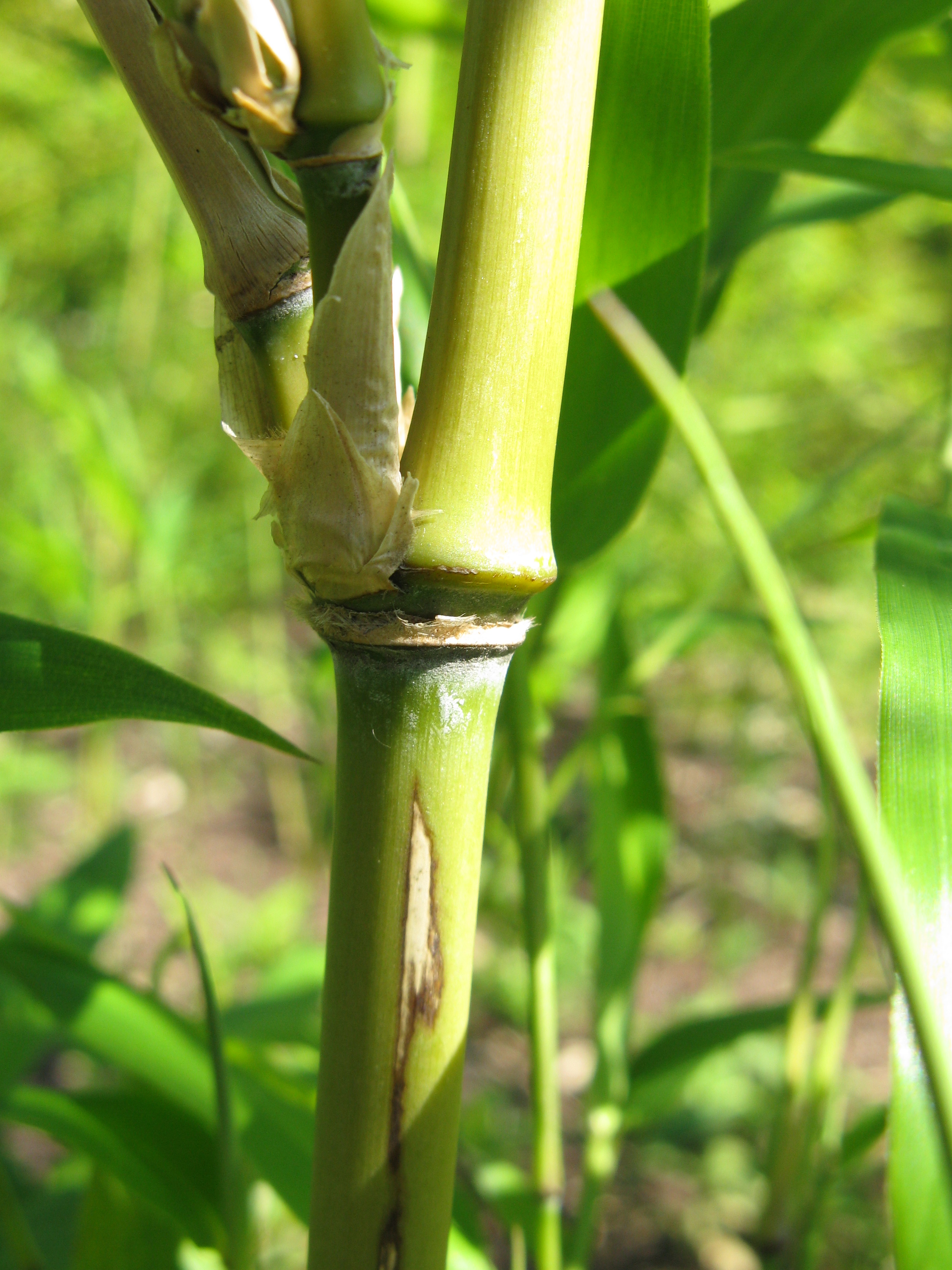
- Sinobambusa tootsik

Scientific classification
- Kingdom: Plantae
- Clade: Tracheophytes
- Clade: Angiosperms
- Clade: Monocots
- Clade: Commelinids
- Order: Poales
- Family: Poaceae
- Subfamily: Bambusoideae
- Tribe: Arundinarieae
- Subtribe: Arundinariinae
- Genus: Sinobambusa; Makino ex Nakai

Type species
- Sinobambusa tootsik (Makino) Makino ex Nakai

Synonyms
- Neobambus Keng ex Keng f.

= Sinobambusa =

Genus of grasses

Sinobambusa is a genus of East Asian bamboo in the grass family. It is native to China and Vietnam. Sinobambusa tootsik also occurs in Japan, having been introduced there during the Tang dynasty (618–907).

Species

1. Sinobambusa baccanensis T.Q.Nguyen – Vietnam
2. Sinobambusa farinosa (McClure) T.H.Wen – Fujian, Guangdong, Guangxi, Jiangxi, Zhejiang
3. Sinobambusa henryi (McClure) C.D.Chu & C.S.Chao – Guangdong, Guangxi
4. Sinobambusa humila McClure – Guangdong
5. Sinobambusa incana T.H.Wen – Guangdong
6. Sinobambusa intermedia McClure – Fujian, Guangdong, Guangxi, Sichuan, Yunnan
7. Sinobambusa nephroaurita C.D.Chu & C.S.Chao – Guangdong, Guangxi, Sichuan
8. Sinobambusa rubroligula McClure – Guangdong, Guangxi, Hainan
9. Sinobambusa sat (Balansa) C.S.Chao & Renvoize – Vietnam
10. Sinobambusa scabrida T.H.Wen – Guangxi
11. Sinobambusa solearis (McClure) T.Q.Nguyen – Vietnam
12. Sinobambusa tootsik (Makino) Makino ex Nakai – Fujian, Guangdong, Guangxi, Vietnam; naturalized in Japan including Ryukyu Islands
13. Sinobambusa yixingensis C.S.Chao & K.S.Xiao – Jiangsu

Formerly included

see Acidosasa Chimonobambusa Gelidocalamus Indosasa Oligostachyum Phyllostachys Pleioblastus Pseudosasa Yushania

- Sinobambusa acutiligulata – Oligostachyum hupehense
- Sinobambusa anaurita – Oligostachyum hupehense
- Sinobambusa callosa – Chimonobambusa callosa
- Sinobambusa dushanensis – Oligostachyum spongiosum
- Sinobambusa edulis – Acidosasa edulis
- Sinobambusa elegans – Yushania elegans
- Sinobambusa exaurita – Oligostachyum scabriflorum
- Sinobambusa fimbriata – Phyllostachys rubromarginata
- Sinobambusa gibbosa – Indosasa crassiflora
- Sinobambusa gigantea – Indosasa gigantea
- Sinobambusa glabrescens – Oligostachyum glabrescens
- Sinobambusa kunishii – Gelidocalamus kunishii
- Sinobambusa maculata – Pleioblastus maculatus
- Sinobambusa parvifolia – Oligostachyum sulcatum
- Sinobambusa puberula – Oligostachyum puberulum
- Sinobambusa pulchella – Pseudosasa cantorii
- Sinobambusa seminuda – Pleioblastus hsienchuensis
- Sinobambusa sichuanensis – Chimonobambusa sichuanensis
- Sinobambusa striata – Indosasa longispicata
- Sinobambusa sulcata – Oligostachyum scabriflorum
- Sinobambusa urens – Pleioblastus rugatus
