= Cane Ridge (Stoddard County, Missouri) =

Ridge in Missouri, U.S.

Coordinates: 36°37′52″N 89°42′58″W

Cane Ridge is a ridge in southeastern Stoddard County in the U.S. state of Missouri.

Cane Ridge was so named on account of canebrake in the area.
