= Dactylispa sjoestedti =

Scientific classification
- Kingdom: Animalia
- Phylum: Arthropoda
- Class: Insecta
- Order: Coleoptera
- Suborder: Polyphaga
- Infraorder: Cucujiformia
- Family: Chrysomelidae
- Genus: Dactylispa
- Species: D. sjoestedti

Binomial name
- Dactylispa sjoestedti Uhmann, 1928

Species of beetle

Dactylispa sjoestedti is a species of beetle of the family Chrysomelidae. It is found in China (Jiangxi, Guangdong, Guizhou, Yunnan) and India.

== Life history ==
The recorded host plants for this species are Bambusa muliplex, Bambusa glaucescens, Bambusa tuldoides, Bambusa sinospinosa, Lingnania chungii, Lingnania cerocissima and Sinobambusa tootsik.
