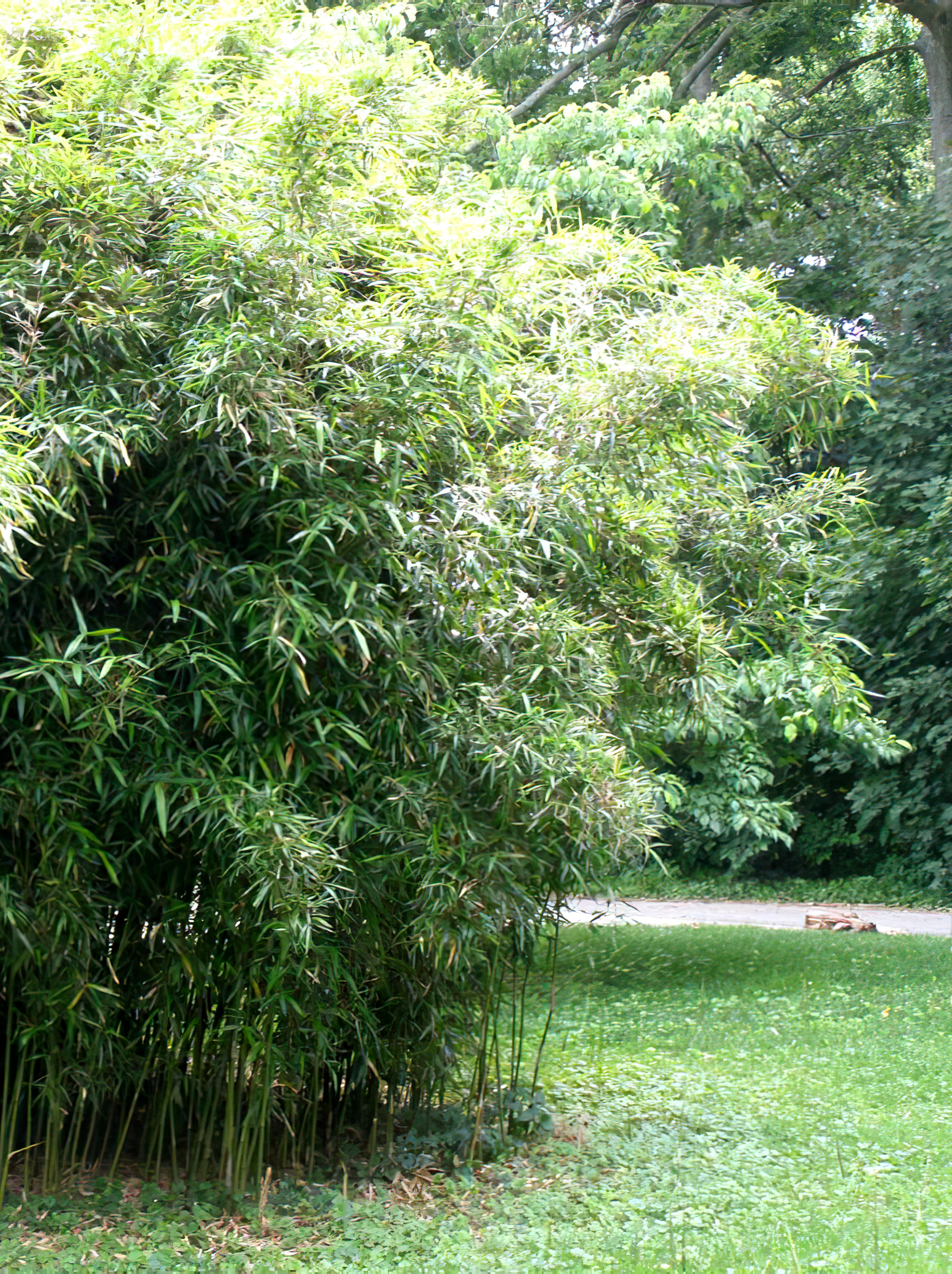
- Grouping of Arundinaria gigantea at Cane Ridge Meeting House in Kentucky, US

Conservation status
- Secure (NatureServe)

Scientific classification
- Kingdom: Plantae
- Clade: Tracheophytes
- Clade: Angiosperms
- Clade: Monocots
- Clade: Commelinids
- Order: Poales
- Family: Poaceae
- Genus: Arundinaria
- Species: A. gigantea

Binomial name
- Arundinaria gigantea (Walter) Muhl.

= Arundinaria gigantea =

Species of bamboo from North America known as giant river cane

Arundinaria gigantea is a species of bamboo known as giant cane (not to be confused with Arundo donax), river cane, and giant river cane. It is endemic to the south-central and southeastern United States as far west as Oklahoma and Texas and as far north as New York. Giant river cane was economically and culturally important to indigenous people, with uses including as a vegetable and materials for construction and craft production. Arundinaria gigantea and other species of Arundinaria once grew in large colonies called canebrakes covering thousands of acres in the southeastern United States, but today these canebrakes are considered endangered ecosystems.

== Description ==
This bamboo is a perennial grass with a rounded, hollow stem which can exceed 7 cm (2.8 in) in diameter and grow to a height of 10 m (33 ft). It grows from a large network of thick rhizomes. The lance-shaped leaves are up to 30 cm (12 in) long and 4 cm (1.6 in) wide. The inflorescence is a raceme or panicle of spikelets measuring 4 to 7 cm (1.6 to 2.8 in) in length. An individual cane has a lifespan of about 10 years. Most reproduction is vegetative as the bamboo sprouts new stems from its rhizome. It rarely produces seeds and it flowers irregularly. R.S. Cocks writing in 1908, stated that certain clumps of bamboo near Abita Springs, Louisiana had been blooming annually in the latter part of May for nine years. Sometimes it flowers gregariously. In its native range, this bamboo is sometimes confused with introduced, non-native bamboos. Today river cane patches are significantly diminished from their previous size and extent.

== History ==
Before European settlers colonized North America, Native American peoples throughout the southeastern United States used A. gigantea to build and craft tools, containers and artistic works, particularly baskets, which used complex techniques requiring great skill. Because of this, the cane is a highly culturally significant species. Native Americans used fire to encourage the growth of river cane, and canes at this time could reach three inches in diameter.

In the 18th century, European settlers encountered river cane when entering the land west of the Appalachian Mountains. Cane was a striking feature of the Bluegrass region of Kentucky, as emphasized by early historians of the state. One source states that the Bluegrass "was carpeted with cane even as the land of Virginia with the grass," and that this was a "novel spectacle" to settlers from Virginia. The earliest European map of the region, created by John Filson, shows the northeastern part of the state as "a cane-covered savanna." The canebrakes grew so thick and tall they were nearly impenetrable, and could be enormous, such as the 15-mile canebrake covering the ridge top at Cane Ridge. A legend from the 1770s describes two men hunting in the same canebrake for days, each hearing another person nearby but not seeing each other, and assuming they were being stalked by an Indian; when they finally met, they were both so relieved that they embraced each other. However, the canebrakes in the Bluegrass were cleared sufficiently for European agriculture to be practiced by 1799. Land survey records from 1820 in Georgia indicate that a 17,250-acre tract in Taylor and Crawford counties, along the western side of the Flint River, was a canebrake "so vast and impenetrable that surveyors could find no trees on which to post their lot numbers." In 1908, Teddy Roosevelt described cane growing to heights of fifteen to twenty feet in Louisiana, spaced only a few inches apart.

Canebrakes declined after European settlement of the American southeast. Factors involved in the decline include the introduction of livestock such as cattle, which eagerly graze on the leaves. The cane was considered a good forage for the animals until overgrazing began to eliminate canebrake habitat. Other reasons for the decline include the conversion of the land for agriculture and fire suppression.

== Habitat and ecology ==
During the last Glacial Maximum, the range of this plant was restricted to a narrow strip along the Gulf Coast. When the ice sheets retreated, it spread northward to its current range.

This native plant is a member of several plant communities today, generally occurring as a component of the understory or midstory. It grows in pine forests dominated by loblolly, slash, longleaf, and shortleaf pine, and stands of oaks, cypress, ash, and cottonwood. Other plants in the understory include inkberry (Ilex glabra), creeping blueberry (Vaccinium crassifolium), wax myrtle (Morella cerifera), blue huckleberry (Gaylussacia frondosa), pineland threeawn (Aristida stricta), cutover muhly (Muhlenbergia expansa), little bluestem (Schizachyrium scoparium), and toothache grass (Ctenium aromaticum). Cane communities occur on floodplains, bogs, riparian woods, pine barrens and savannas, and pocosins. It grows easily in flooded and saturated soils.

Cane is considered to be a fire dependent species. Canebrakes are maintained by a fire regime where intervals between burns range from 2–8 years.

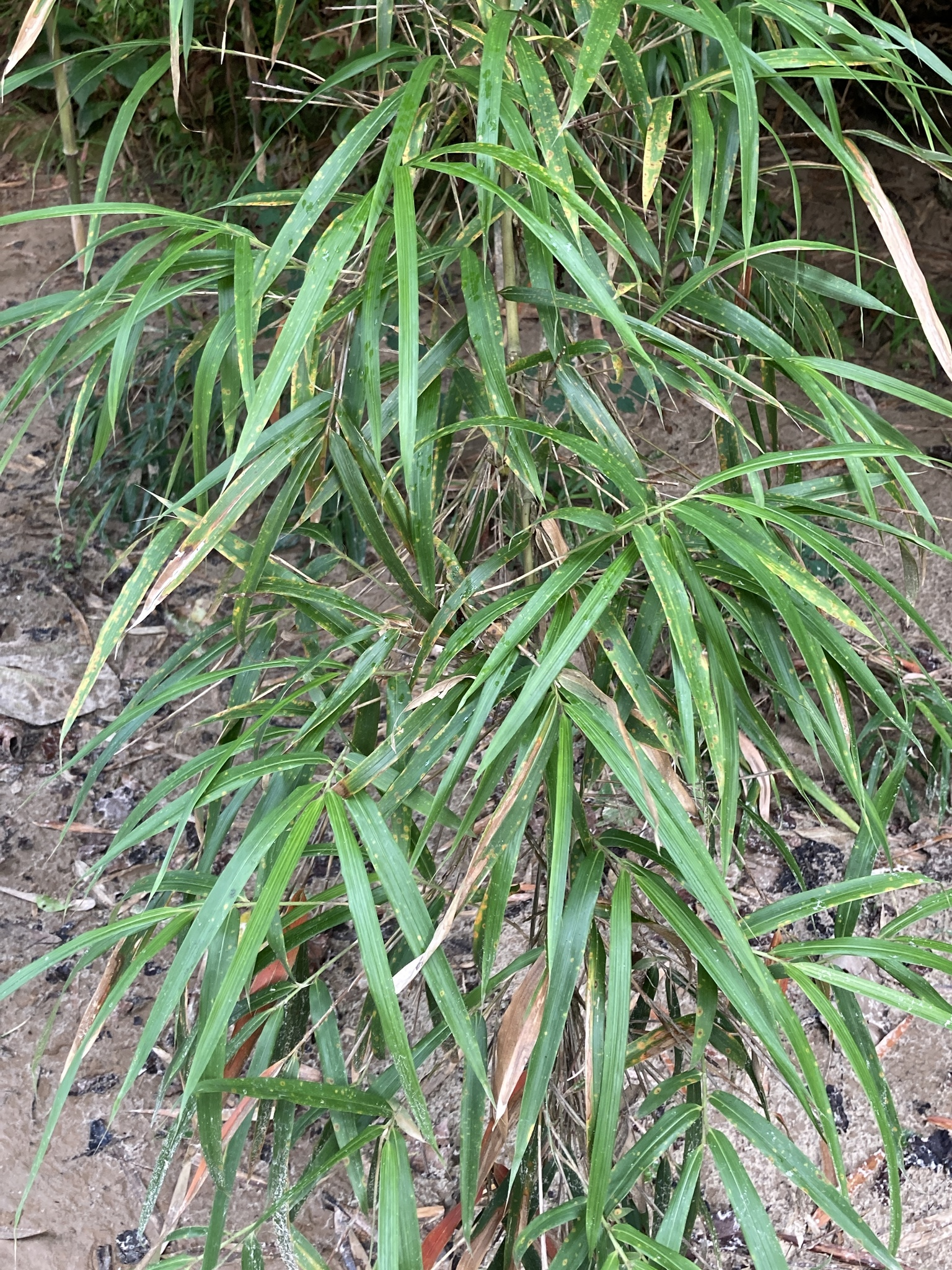
Arundinaria gigantea in Natchez, Mississippi, US

Giant cane has been documented as providing food and shelter for 70 species, including six butterfly species that depend almost exclusively on it for food. An example of a butterfly that requires cane as a food plant is the southern pearly eye. Canebrakes are an important habitat for the Swainson's, hooded, and Kentucky warblers, as well as the white-eyed vireo. The disappearance of the canebrake ecosystem may have contributed to the rarity and possible extinction of the Bachman's warbler, which was dependent upon it for nesting sites. Giant cane was also one of three major sources of food for passenger pigeons, and the disappearance of canebrakes may have helped cause its extinction.

Giant cane may be prevented from growing by invasive plants like quackgrass that spread horizontally, but tall native plants such as big bluestem and ironweed have been reported to have a positive effect.

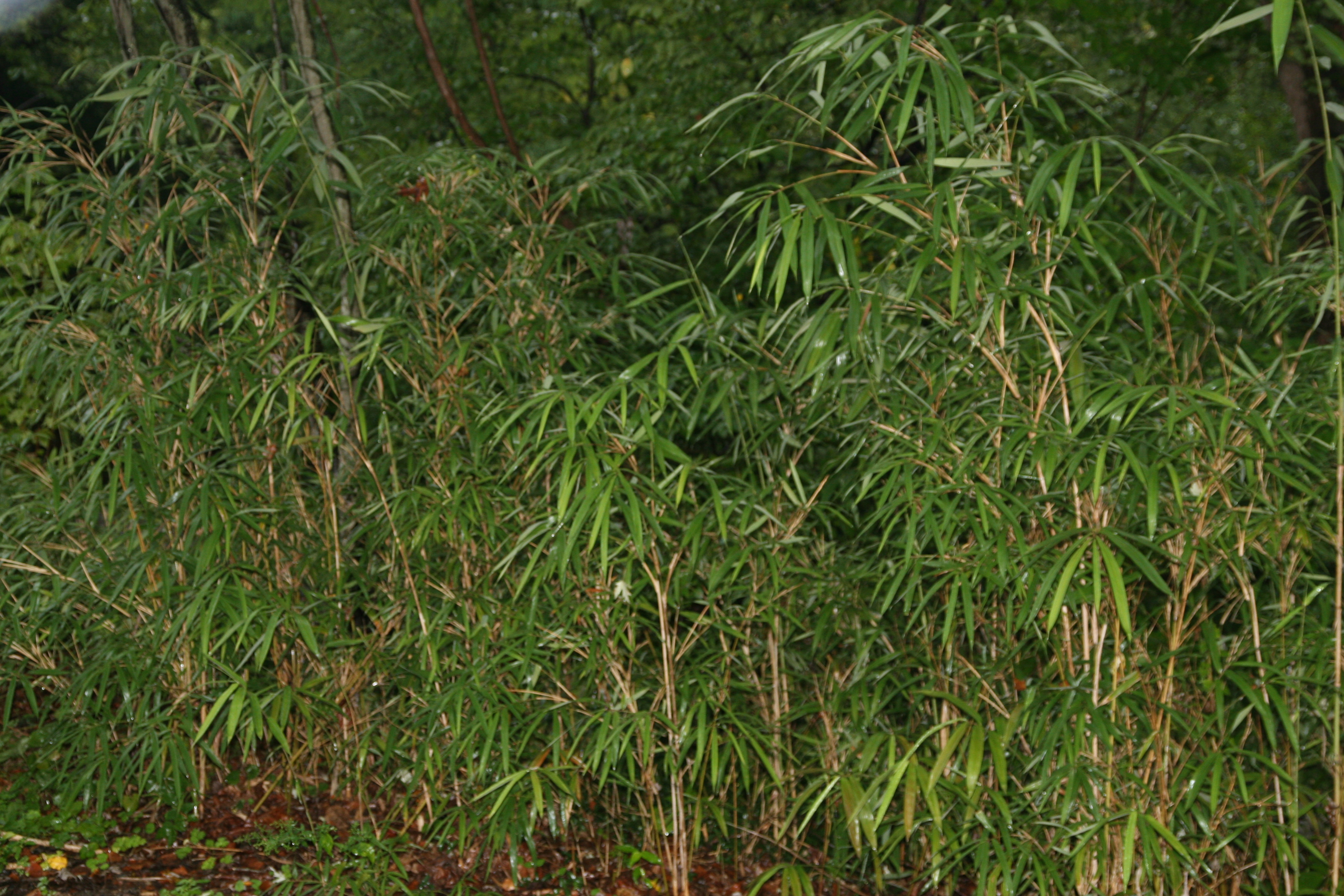
Arundinaria gigantea at The Botanical Gardens at Asheville, Asheville, North Carolina, US

== Uses and cultural significance ==
There are many human uses for the cane. The Cherokee, particularly the Eastern Band of Cherokee Indians, use this species in basketry. The Cherokee historically maintained canebrakes with cutting and periodic burning, a practice which stopped with the European settlement of the land. The elimination of cane habitat has nearly resulted in the loss of the art of basketmaking, which is important for the economy of the Cherokee today. Canebrakes have been reduced in area by at least 98% and cane may take 20 years to grow to a sufficient size to be used for traditional basketry. Because of this, Cherokee basketmakers nowadays often do not have access to the traditional material for making Cherokee baskets, which are considered some of the finest in the world.

The art of river cane basketry is also important to the Choctaw, whose artisans have faced similar problems due to the increasing disappearance of canebrakes. The cane was also used by groups such as the Cherokee, Seminole, Chickasaw and Choctaw to make medicine, blowguns, bows and arrows, knives, spears, flutes, candles, walls for dwellings, fish traps, sleeping mats, tobacco pipes, and food. River cane is an important symbol of the Choctaw nation because its significance to the nation's history and the numerous ways it provided for the survival of the Choctaw.

In 2022, the Cherokee Nation signed an agreement with the National Park Service to allow collection of 76 culturally important plant species in the Buffalo River National Park in Arkansas, including A. gigantea.

Giant cane is of interest due to its extraordinary capability to reduce both sediment loss and nitrate runoff when planted as a "buffer" between waterways and agricultural fields. A giant cane buffer zone can reduce nitrate pollution in ground water by 99%. Stands of cane are superior even to forests as protective buffers around waterways, absorbing sediment and nitrate pollution and dramatically slowing the rate at which runoff enters the stream or river.
