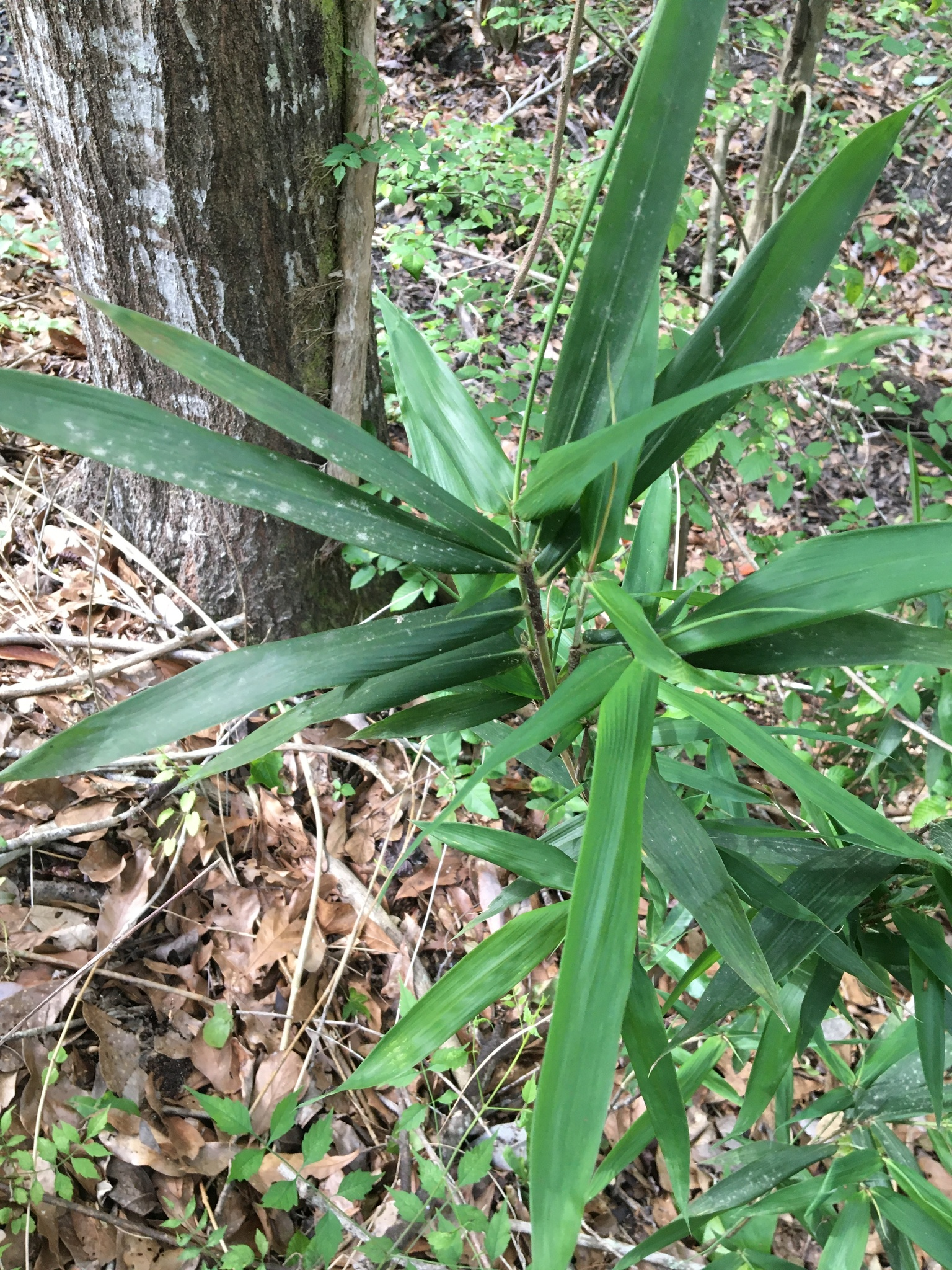
- Arundinaria tecta northern Florida in March 2003

Scientific classification
- Kingdom: Plantae
- Clade: Tracheophytes
- Clade: Angiosperms
- Clade: Monocots
- Clade: Commelinids
- Order: Poales
- Family: Poaceae
- Subfamily: Bambusoideae
- Tribe: Arundinarieae
- Subtribe: Arundinariinae
- Genus: Arundinaria; Michx.

Synonyms
- Ludolfia Willd. 1808, illegitimate homonym not Adans. 1763 (Aizoaceae); Macronax Raf.; Miegia Pers. 1805, illegitimate homonym not Schreb. 1791 (Cyperaceae); Triglossum Fisch.

= Arundinaria =

Genus of American bamboo, often referred to in American English as cane

Arundinaria is a genus of bamboo in the grass family, the members of which are referred to generally as cane. Arundinaria is the only bamboo native to North America, with a native range from Maryland south to Florida and west to the southern Ohio Valley and Texas. Within this region Arundinaria cane is found from the Coastal Plain to medium elevations in the Appalachian Mountains.

Prior to the European colonization of the Americas, cane was an important resource for Indigenous peoples of the Americas. Early European explorers in the U.S. described vast monotypic stands of Arundinaria that were common in river lowlands and covered hundreds of thousands of hectares. In the modern era, Arundinaria canebrakes are small and isolated, but there has been interest in restoring them due to the cultural and ecological importance of the plant. Canebrakes provided land for crops, habitat for wild game, and year-round forage for livestock. The cane itself was used for construction, weapons, jewelry, medicines, fuel, and food. Canebrakes declined significantly after colonization due to clearing, farming and fire suppression.

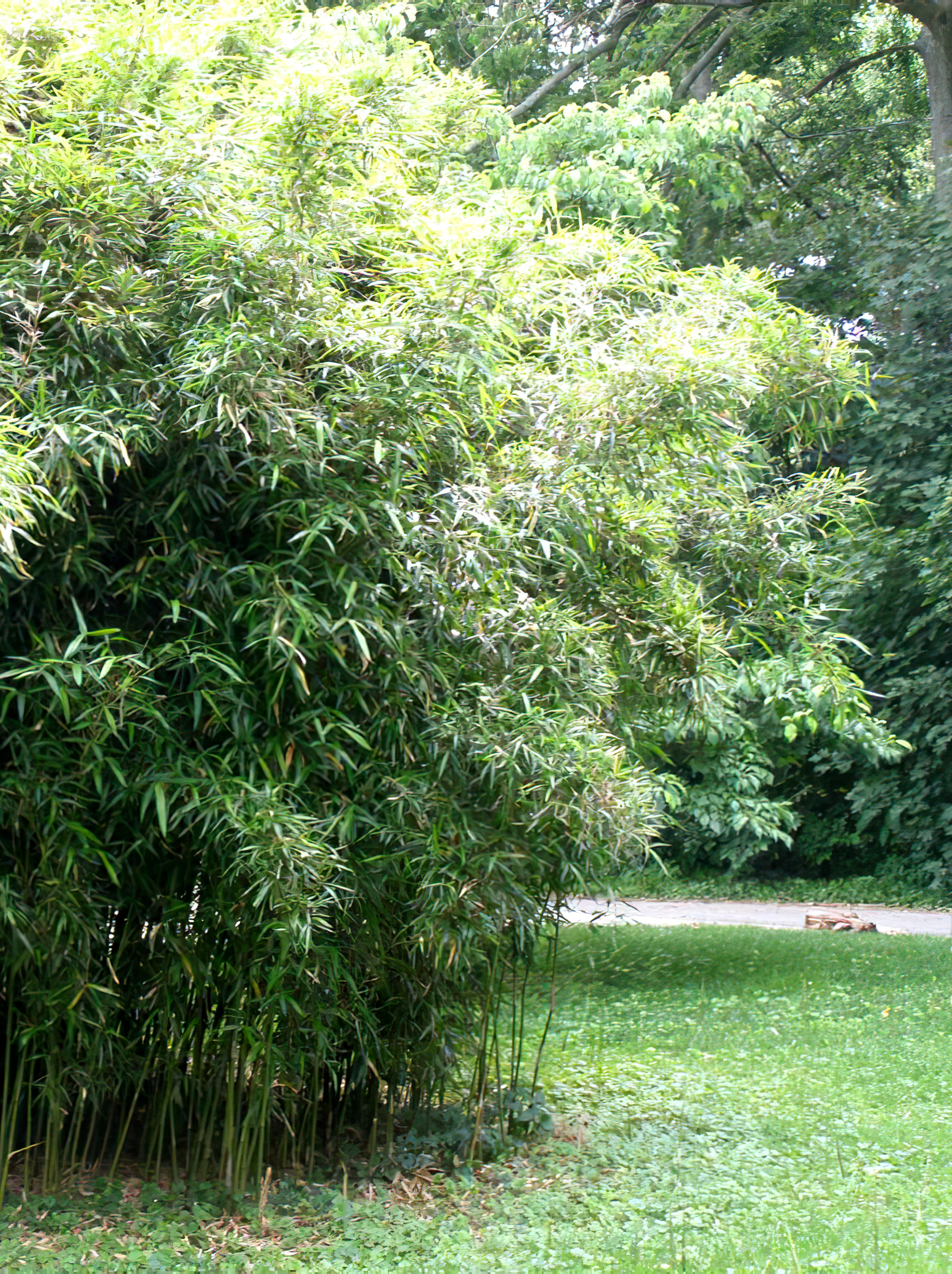
Grouping of Arundinaria gigantea at Cane Ridge Meeting House in Kentucky, USA

== Description ==
Arundinaria species have running rhizomes and have slender, woody culms that reach heights from 0.5 to 8 metres (1.6 to 26.2 ft). Arundinaria produce seeds only rarely and usually reproduce vegetatively, forming large clonal genets. When seed production does occur, the colony usually dies afterwards, possibly because the dense thickets of a mature canebrake would otherwise prevent seedling establishment. Only two flowering events are known for A. appalachiana. A colony of cane will expand rapidly using asexual reproduction following disturbances, particularly fire, which triggers new shoots to immediately sprout from the underground rhizomes after the above-ground part of the plant has burned. These shoots grow quickly, up to 1.5 inches per day. Among the distinctive features of the canes is a fan-like cluster of leaves at the top of new stems called a topknot, so-called because of its resemblance to topknot hairstyles.

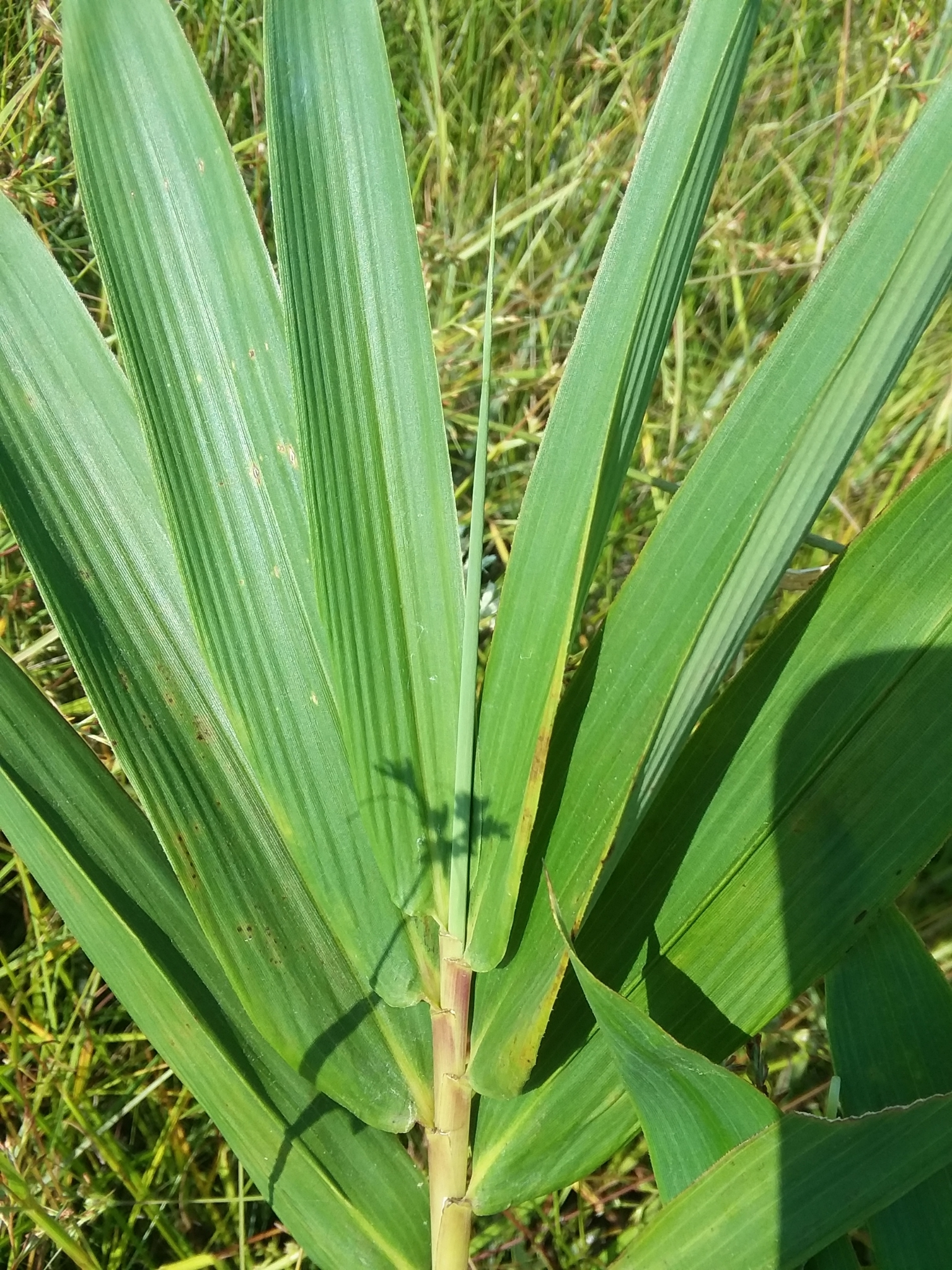
'Topknot' at the top of an Arundinaria tecta 'switch cane' culm

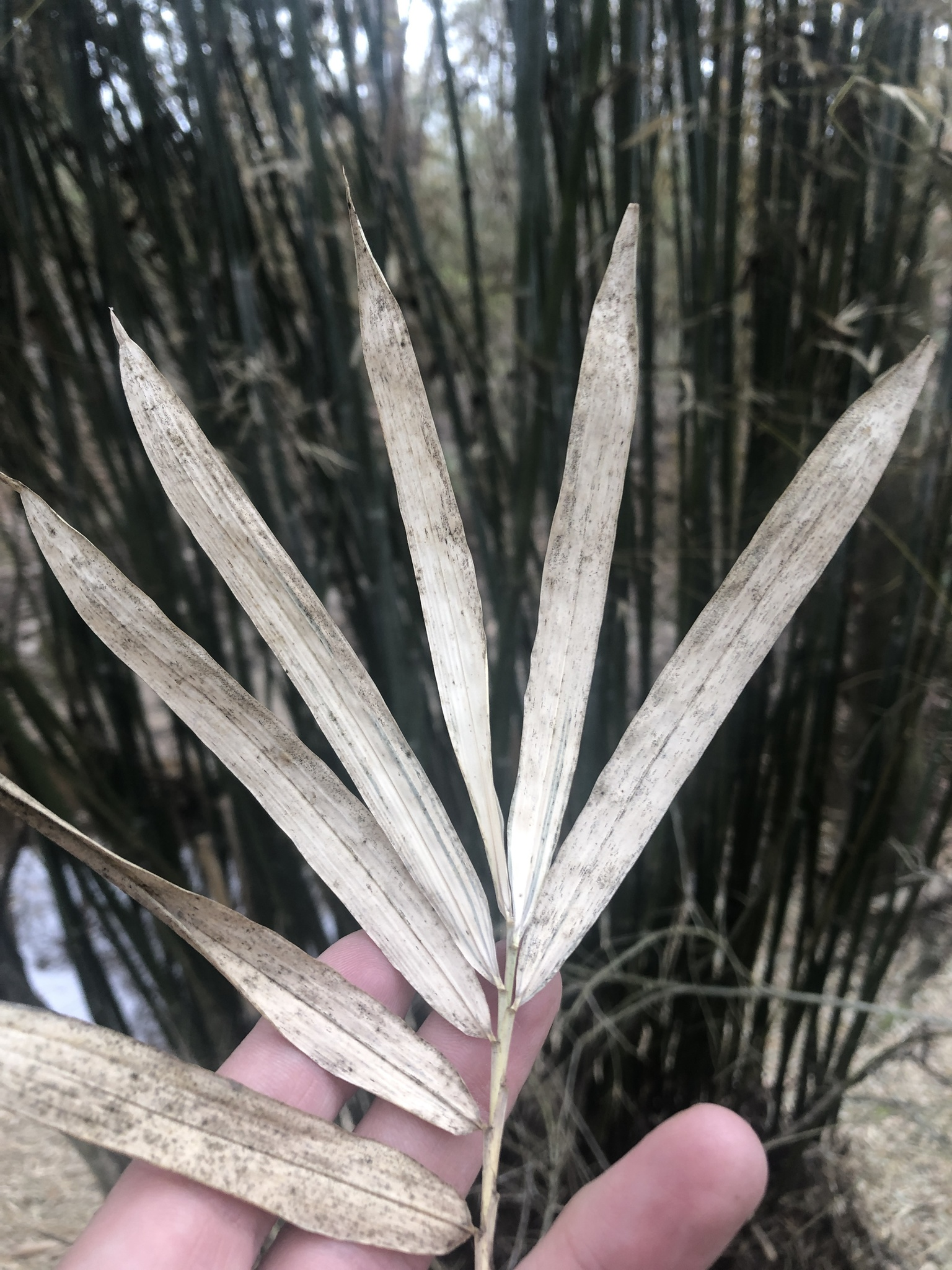
Dried Arundinaria 'topknot' from the top of an Arundinaria gigantea 'giant river cane' culm

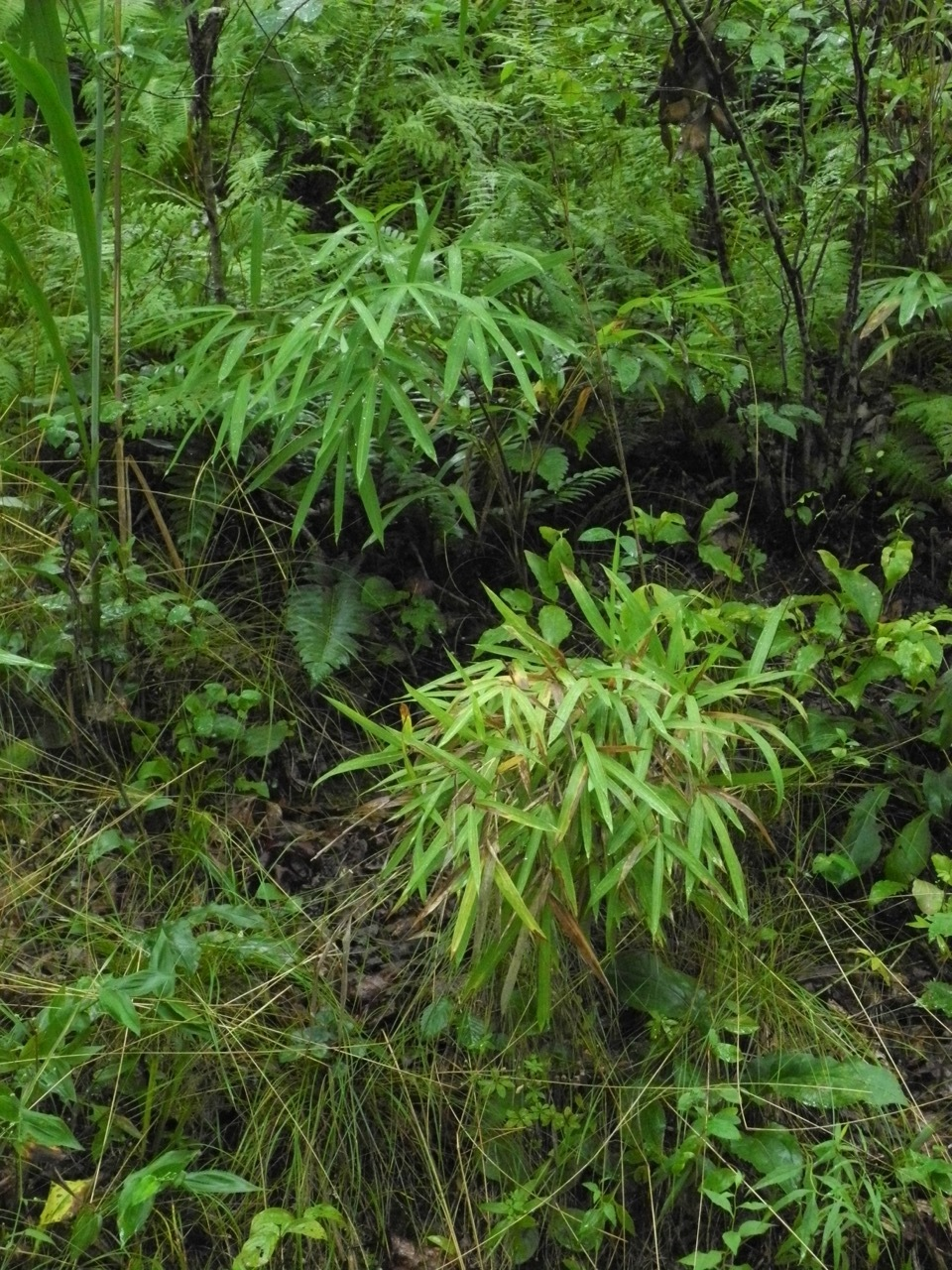
Arundinaria appalachiana along the Little Tennessee River

== Taxonomy ==
=== Species ===
There are four species of Arundinaria accepted by the World Checklist of Vascular Plants (WCVP) as of January 2024, listed below.

- Arundinaria alabamensis Triplett – Tallapoosa cane
- Arundinaria appalachiana Triplett, Weakley & L.G.Clark – Hill cane
- Arundinaria gigantea (Walt.) Muhl. – River cane
- Arundinaria tecta Muhl. – Switch cane

=== Taxonomic history ===
The genus Arundinaria has a complex taxonomic history spanning over two centuries. The canes of the southeastern U.S. were originally described as two species of reed grasses in the genus Arundo by Thomas Walter in 1788. André Michaux, working in 1803 and unaware of Walter's work, correctly interpreted the canes as a distinct group and created the genus Arundinaria with one species. However, neither of these researchers left enough information to their successors, leading to confusion surrounding the identity of the species they had described. A decade later in 1813, G.H.E. Muhlenberg noticed the affinities between the two previous authors' work and transferred Walter's two species to Michaux's new genus, yielding a combinatio nova for each, namely Arundinaria gigantea (Walt.) Muhl. and Arundinaria tecta (Walt.) Muhl.. Muhlenberg considered the genus to consist of these two species in addition to Arundinaria macrosperma Michx..

The phenotypic diversity of the American Arundinaria bamboos subsequently led to a variety of taxonomic treatments, with some authors arguing that only the North American species should be included, while others included dozens of Asian species otherwise considered members of other genera (Bashania, Oligostachyum, Sarocalamus, Fargesia, Sasa, etc.). Even African bamboos were placed in Arundinaria under broad concepts for the group. Some outdated systems during this era assigned Arundinaria more than 400 species.

A. S. Hitchcock's review of the taxonomic state of the North American bamboos was first published in 1935 as part of the Manual of the Grasses of the United States. He interpreted Michaux's Arundinaria macrosperma Michx. as a synonym of Walter's Arundinaria gigantea (Walt.) Muhl., reducing the genus to two species. By the late 20th century, Floyd Alonzo McClure's 1973 survey of Arundinaria was also considered authoritative, and included only one species, Arundinaria gigantea. Most recently, in 2006 researchers from Iowa State University and the University of North Carolina recognised and described a third species, Arundinaria appalachiana Triplett, Weakley & L.G. Clark. The plants that form this species were previously thought to form part of the natural genetic diversity of Arundinaria gigantea (Walt.) Muhl., but upon in depth analysis using modern phylogenetic methods based on morphology and amplified fragment length polymorphisms, the researchers determined that the canes form three species.Phylogenetic studies in 2006 using molecular and morphological evidence have suggested that the genus forms three natural species confined to the southeastern United States.

== Systematics ==
Two of the three species currently placed in the genus, Arundinaria gigantea and Arundinaria tecta, were first described scientifically by Thomas Walter in his 1788 Flora Caroliniana. Walter placed them in the grass genus Arundo. In 1803, the French botanist André Michaux, unaware of the flora prepared by Walter, also published a description of the canes he encountered. Michaux recognised only one species, but created a new monotypic genus for it: Arundinaria macrosperma Michx.. The name of the genus he used is derived from the same Latin word used by Walter for the plants he described; namely arundo, meaning "reed".

Despite the work done by Walter and Michaux, subsequent researchers had difficulty interpreting their circumscriptions of species boundaries. Walter designated no type specimens, and his Latin protologues that describe the species are vague, including features that could be any of the three species currently recognized. Michaux did designate a type specimen for the species he described, but it does not include enough of the plant to determine with confidence which species it represents, while his protologues were likewise not detailed enough to avoid ambiguity. In 2009, epitypes, a new form of botanical type allowed by the International Code of Botanical Nomenclature in order to clarify older ambiguous types, were designated for Arundo gigantea Walt. and Arundinaria macrosperma Michx.. This allows current and future researchers to know precisely what is being discussed when the scientific names applied to these plants are used.

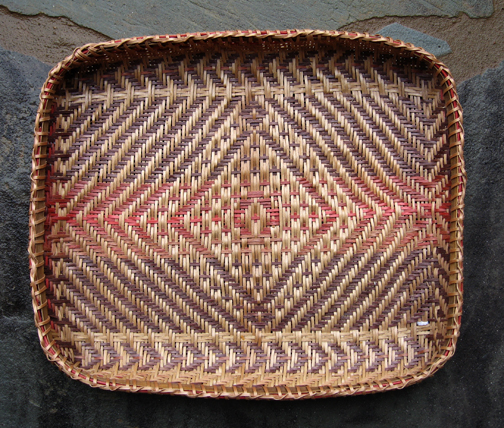
Rivercane basket in Noon-Day Sun pattern, by Peggy Brennan (Cherokee Nation)

== Uses ==
Ethnobotanists consider cane to have been extremely important to Native Americans in the Southeastern Woodlands before European colonisation. The river cane basketry art is at minimum 3000 years old, and can arguably be considered "the most difficult and complex of weaving technologies." The plant was used to make structures, arrow shafts, weapons, torches, fishing equipment, jewelry, baskets, musical instruments, furniture, boats, pipe stems, and medicines. Arundinaria gigantea, or river cane, has historically been used to construct Native American flutes, particularly among tribes of the Eastern Woodlands. The Atakapa, Catawba, Muscogee Creek, Chickasaw, Choctaw, Cherokee, and other Southeastern tribes have traditionally used this material for mat and basket weaving, and the Chitimacha and Eastern Band Cherokee still widely weave with rivercane today, though basket makers have started making smaller baskets in order to use less material and preserve the increasingly rare river cane. Bean poles made from dried canes can last for several years if properly stored when not in use.

=== Basketry ===
There are several reasons river cane is favored over all other materials for crafting. It can be split into coarser sections for sturdier baskets, or split very thinly for baskets that are delicate and flexible. The smooth, satiny outer surface of the cane stems forms a natural patina when heat or friction is applied to the outer surface. Cane suitable for basket weaving is straight, with the nodes spaced far apart.

Cane is processed by splitting cut sections from top to bottom into quarters or eighths, and then carefully peeling off the smooth outer layer in a single long piece, scraping off any excess material from the inner surface until the splits are thin and flexible enough to be easily wrapped around the artisan's finger. The splits are soaked in water to keep them flexible and woven wet. Undyed cane baskets change from green, to cream, to finally yellow as they age. After this, the color of the cane does not change and a basket that is 100 years old can look the same as one that is 500 years old. Cane splits are dyed a variety of colors including black, brown, red, orange, yellow, or purple and woven into intricate geometric designs. Claude Medford Jr., a Choctaw craftsman, taught the techniques of boiling bloodroot with salt for orange dye, using black walnut for brown and black dye, soaking cane along with curly dock for yellow, and adding mussel shells to cane soaking in curly dock to change the color to red. Plaiting and twilling are the two basic weaving techniques utilized in river cane baskets, and from there many variations exist, including double-woven baskets. Different tribes of Native Americans, and often specific families, had their own unique designs and techniques, which spread around through trade. The Chitimacha and Catawba split the cane into very narrow splits and weave them with the smooth side inward, whereas the Choctaw weave with wider splits and face the smooth side outward. When Native Americans were forced into lands different than their homelands, many techniques became lost, and new techniques had to be found for dyeing and crafting. Other new techniques were adopted to be marketable to European settlers for trading. One example of knowledge that has been lost is the original Choctaw names for patterns used in basketry, which had to be planned using mathematics because they were so sophisticated. Many traditional patterns themselves, however, still survive.

=== Food ===
Food uses include flour, cereal, and even "asparagus" of young shoots; however, caution should be used whenever foraging for cane seeds, as the extremely toxic fungus ergot (Claviceps spp.) can colonize its seeds as well as those of the common cereals. Ergot-infected plants will have pink or purplish blotches or growths about the size of a seed or several times larger.

Medicinally, the Choctaw use the roots for their painkilling properties.

== Conservation ==
The organization Revitalization of Traditional Cherokee Artisan Resources, using funding from the Cherokee Preservation Foundation, has helped establish restoration sites for Arundinaria gigantea. In 2022, the United Keetoowah Band of Cherokee Indians was awarded a $1.9 million grant by the National Fish and Wildlife Foundation to manage and restore river cane ecosystems throughout their historic homelands in Oklahoma.

== See also ==
- Canebrakes
