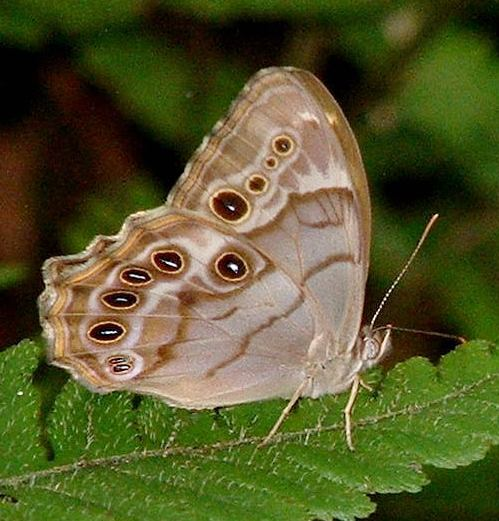

Conservation status
- Apparently Secure (NatureServe)

Scientific classification
- Kingdom: Animalia
- Phylum: Arthropoda
- Clade: Pancrustacea
- Class: Insecta
- Order: Lepidoptera
- Family: Nymphalidae
- Genus: Lethe
- Species: L. portlandia

Binomial name
- Lethe portlandia (Fabricius, 1781)

Subspecies
- L. p. portlandia (Fabricius, 1781); L. p. floralae Heitzman & dos Passos, 1974; L. p. missarka Heitzman & dos Passos, 1974

Synonyms
- List: Papilio portlandia Fabricius, 1781; Oreas andromacha Hübner, [1809]; Enodia androcardia Hübner, 1821; Enodia portlandia Fabricius, 1781; Gnodia portlandia

= Lethe portlandia =

Species of butterfly

Lethe portlandia, the southern pearly eye, Portland pearlyeye or just pearly eye, is a species of butterfly in the family Nymphalidae. It is found in the United States from eastern Oklahoma and eastern Texas east through the south-east.

The wingspan is 56–70 mm. Adults feed on sap, rotting fruit, carrion and dung.

The larvae feed on the leaves of Arundinaria tecta. The species overwinters in the larval stage.
