= Canebrake =

Thicket of any of a variety of Arundinaria grasses

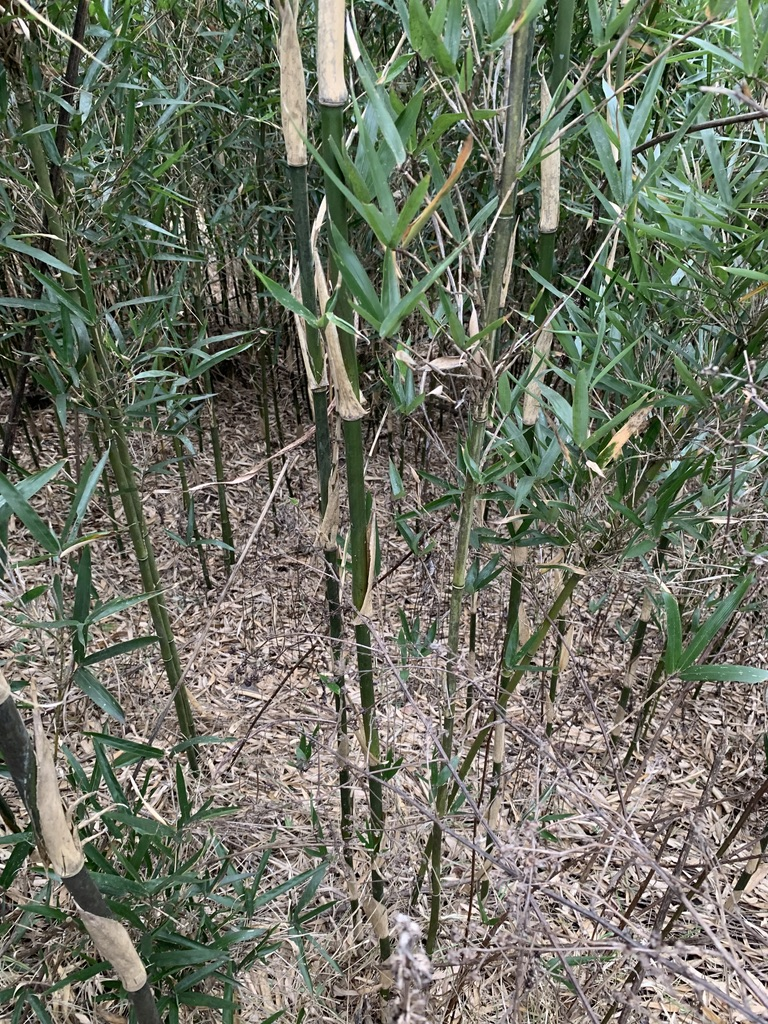
Arundinaria gigantea in a canebrake in Kentucky

A canebrake or canebreak is a thicket of any of a variety of Arundinaria grasses: A. gigantea, A. tecta and A. appalachiana. As a bamboo, these giant grasses grow in thickets up to 24 feet (7.3 m) tall. A. gigantea is generally found in stream valleys and ravines throughout the southeastern United States. A. tecta is a smaller stature species found on the Atlantic and Gulf Coastal Plains. Finally, A. appalachiana is found in more upland areas at the southern end of the Appalachian Mountains. Cane does not do well on sites that meet wetland classification. Instead, canebrakes are characteristic of moist lowland, floodplain areas that are not as saturated as true wetlands.

== History ==
Canebrakes were formerly widespread in the Southern United States, potentially covering 10,000,000 acres (4,000,000 ha), The presence of canebrakes signaled to Native Americans and to early European settlers that an area was fertile and ecologically rich. The canebrakes were a striking feature of the landscape to the earliest European explorers, who remarked upon how densely the cane grew and how difficult it was to travel through. For example, in 1728 William Byrd described hacking through a "forest" of cane "more than a furlong [220 yards] in depth" as he blazed a trail along the border of Virginia and Carolina. Likewise, William Bartram described "the most extensive Canebreak that is to be seen on the face of the whole earth," writing that the canes grew 10–12 feet (3.0–3.7 m) tall and so close together they were completely impassable without hacking a trail through them.

However, as European settlers came, the cane gradually disappeared as it was used as high-quality forage for livestock that was available all year round. Pigs in particular destroyed canebrakes rapidly by rooting up their underground rhizomes, and the settlers intentionally used pigs to clear out canebrakes so they could be converted to agricultural land. The absence of the controlled burns used by Native Americans to maintain the canebrakes, conversion to agricultural land, and grazing by livestock has almost eliminated the canebrakes. Destruction of habitat for development and construction is also implicated as a cause of the decline by the Choctaw Nation.

== Ecology ==
This destruction has impacted a number of species. The survival of the Florida panther (Puma concolor couguar) has been challenged, and Bachman's warbler (Vermivora bachmanii) has probably become extinct. The extinct Carolina parakeet (Conuropsis carolinensis) also depended on canebrakes, and their demise may have been hastened by the canebrakes' decline. Other species considered canebrake specialists include as many as seven moth species and five known butterfly species dependent on Arundinaria bamboos as a host plant, and Swainson's warbler (Limnothlypis swainsonii). Swainson's warbler has recently been found to use pine plantations (widespread across the Southeastern United States) of a particular age, as they may provide the structural features and prey base that the species seeks. Contrary to the characterization of canebrakes as homogenous, they host a great diversity of species, including globally rare species. A survey of canebrakes in the Carolinas found 330 taxa living in the canebrake habitat, a number that would likely increase with more study. Canebrakes provide habitat for the critically endangered Alabama canebrake pitcher plant (Sarracenia alabamensis), which is only found in 11 sites in just two counties of the state of Alabama.

Cane can propagate itself rapidly through asexual reproduction, allowing it to persist quietly in the shade of a forest for years and rapidly take advantage of disturbance such as wildfire. Historically, canebrakes were maintained by Native Americans using controlled burns. The fire would burn the aboveground part of the plant but leave the underground rhizomes unharmed.

Canebrakes have been identified as important ecosystems for supporting over 70 wildlife species, possibly ideal candidates for mitigating nitrate pollution in groundwater, and crucial to the material cultures of Southeastern Native American nations, but relatively little study has been devoted to them, partially because virtually all canebrakes that still exist are isolated and fragmentary. Canebrakes are unlikely to be reestablished significantly under current methods of land management, but there is interest in finding out how to restore them.

== Rare plant species ==
Canebrakes have been found to provide habitat for the following rare plants:

- Lysimachia asperulifolia, rough-leaved loosestrife
- Lilium pyrophilum, sandhills lily
- Eupatorium resinosum, pine barrens thoroughwort
- Dionaea muscipula, Venus flytrap
- Sarracenia alabamensis, Alabama canebrake pitcher plant
- Carex austrodeflexa, canebrake sedge

== Conservation ==
Canebrakes are considered a critically endangered ecosystem by many biologists, but they have been studied very little. Southern Illinois University conducts some ongoing research on restoring canebrakes. There is also a great interest among the Eastern Band of Cherokee Indians and other regional tribal nations to restore canebrakes, to preserve the crucial roles the plant plays in Cherokee culture and to stop the art of river cane basket weaving from dying out. The various insect species that are Arundinaria specialists are at risk due to their sensitivity to habitat fragmentation.

A major obstacle to restoring canebrakes is the reproductive habits of Arundinaria bamboos; Arundinaria typically reproduces asexually using rhizomes, forming clonal colonies that spread outward. The plant only flowers every few decades, and usually dies after flowering; additionally, seeds are often not viable. Therefore, propagating the plant must usually be done by dividing existing colonies or growing rhizome cuttings. Conducting studies has been challenging; experimental plantings of cane in a study conducted by researchers at Mississippi State University to test the erosion mitigation potential of canebrakes yielded no results because only 1.2% of seedlings survived the following year.

Southern Illinois University researchers have located 140 patches of giant cane and collaborate with many conservation organizations and the U.S. Department of Agriculture Forest Service in the effort to replant 15 acres of cane per year. In South Carolina, the Chattooga Conservancy has formed a collaboration with the Eastern Band of the Cherokee and the USDA Forest Service to restore 29 acres of canebrake. Revitalization of Traditional Cherokee Artisan Resources (RTCAR) has also coordinated the restoration of river cane on a 109-acre site in North Carolina. This restoration area will include educational signage in the Cherokee and English languages.

In 2023, the United Keetoowah Band of Cherokee Indians in Oklahoma co-hosted the first Rivercane Gathering in Tahlequah, Oklahoma, with the U.S. Forestry Service, an educational event to unite traditional tribal experts and artisans with various researchers and landholders for the continued preservation of canebrakes.
