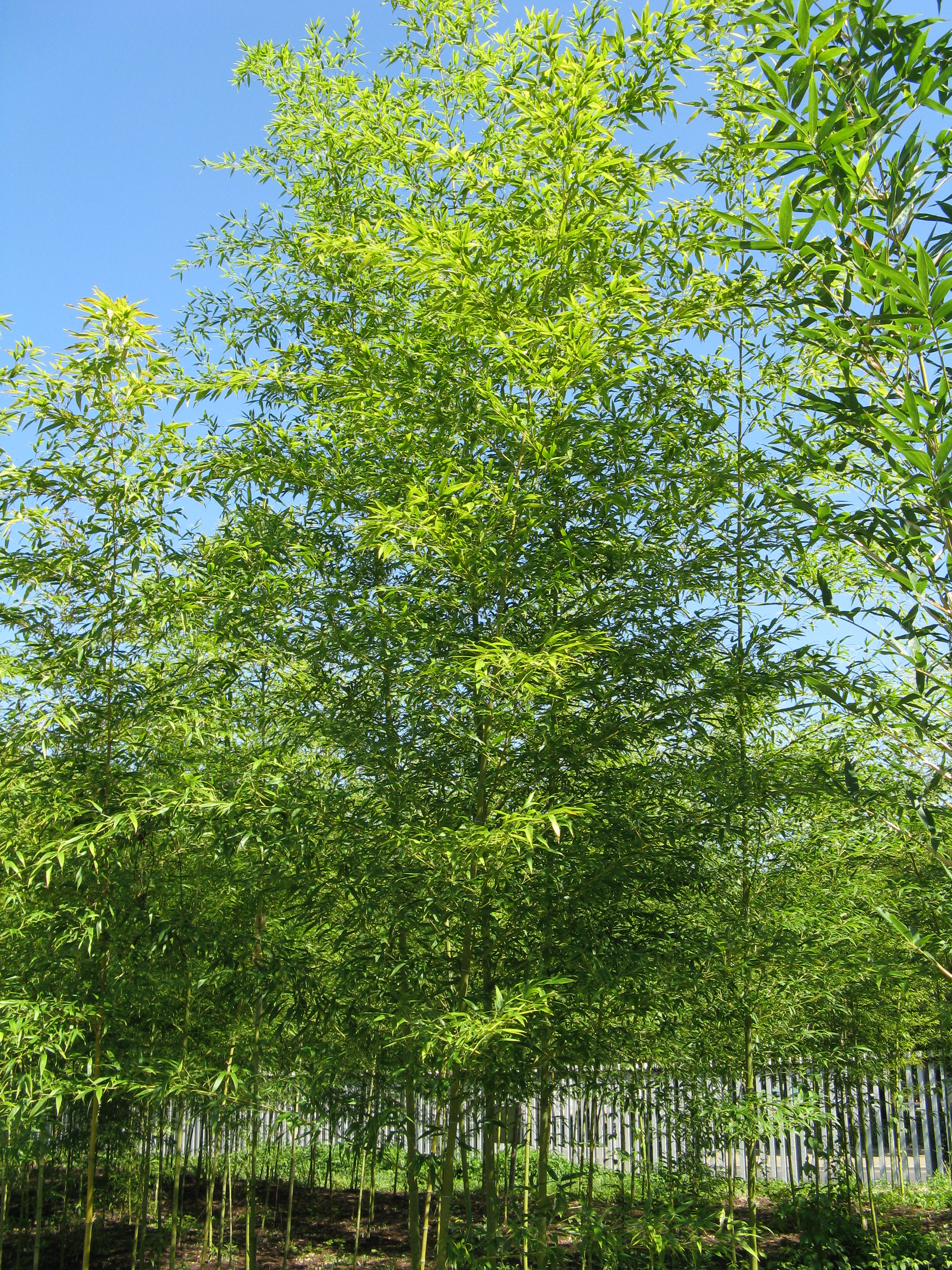

Scientific classification
- Kingdom: Plantae
- Clade: Tracheophytes
- Clade: Angiosperms
- Clade: Monocots
- Clade: Commelinids
- Order: Poales
- Family: Poaceae
- Genus: Semiarundinaria
- Species: S. fastuosa

Binomial name
- Semiarundinaria fastuosa (Lat.-Marl. ex Mitford) Makino ex Nakai

= Semiarundinaria fastuosa =

Species of grass

Semiarundinaria fastuosa, the Narihira bamboo, Narihira cane or Narihiradake, is a species of flowering plant in the grass family Poaceae, native to Japan. Growing to 7 m (23 ft) tall by 2 m (7 ft) broad, it is a vigorous, evergreen bamboo with dark green cylindrical canes and dense tufts of lanceolate, glossy green leaves, up to 20 cm (8 in) long.

In cultivation it is useful as an architectural plant or screen. It has gained the Royal Horticultural Society's Award of Garden Merit.

The specific epithet fastuosa is Latin for "proud".
