= Arundinaria alabamensis =

Conservation status
- Vulnerable (NatureServe)

Scientific classification
- Kingdom: Plantae
- Clade: Tracheophytes
- Clade: Angiosperms
- Clade: Monocots
- Clade: Commelinids
- Order: Poales
- Family: Poaceae
- Genus: Arundinaria
- Species: A. alabamensis

Binomial name
- Arundinaria alabamensis Triplett

Species of bamboo

Arundinaria alabamensis is bamboo species commonly known as Tallapoosa cane. The plant species is endemic to Alabama and is primarily found in the east-central part of the State, mainly the Piedmont Upland physiographic province. Currently, A. alabamensis is the 4th species of native bamboo in the USA.

== Description ==
Arundinaria alabamensis grows from 3–8 ft (0.9–2.4 m) in height, with erect and tillering internodes. The nodes are solitary with one bud per node on a triangular shoulder of the prophyll ciliate. The culm leaves at mid-culm are shorter, but become increasingly longer towards the culm apex. The alternating leaves are triangular to linear, evergreen, pubescent both above and below. Like most other north American woody bamboos, the rhizomes of A. alabamensis are leptomorphic. The growing tips of the new rhizomes travel horizontally for a short distance and then turn upward to form a new culm, indicating a sympodial branching pattern.

== Habitat ==
Arundinaria alabamensis can mainly be found in oak-hickory forests and woodlands. The species can also grow along hillside seepages, less typically in more mesic sites, seeps, and sometimes along perennial streams with sandy and loamy soil.

== Conservation ==
Arundinaria alabamensis is endemic to Alabama, particularly in the Piedmont Upland physiographic province of four counties including Cleburne, Lee, Macon, and Randolph; roughly tracking the Tallapoosa watershed. Although A. alabamensis appears to be apparently secure and harbor more genetic diversity compared to other bamboo species, further research need to be conducted to fully grasp the gene pools and the distribution of the species within the given geographical areas. The ecology of the areas in which this new species is located also needs to be surveyed so that the conservation status and the threats facing A. alabamensis are clearly documented.
