= Semiarundinaria densiflora =

Short-spiked bamboo

Scientific classification
- Kingdom: Plantae
- Clade: Tracheophytes
- Clade: Angiosperms
- Clade: Monocots
- Clade: Commelinids
- Order: Poales
- Family: Poaceae
- Genus: Semiarundinaria
- Species: S. densiflora

Binomial name
- Semiarundinaria densiflora (Rendle) T.H.Wen

Synonyms
- Arundinaria densiflora Rendle; Brachystachyum densiflorum (Rendle) Keng

Species of grass

Semiarundinaria densiflora, the short-spiked bamboo, short-tassled bamboo, or short spikelet bamboo, is a species of bamboos.

== Taxonomy ==
The species is sometimes placed in the monotypic genus Brachystachyum. The species has one variety, Brachystachyum densiflorum var. villosum, referred to as hairy-sheathed short-spiked bamboo in English.
