= Acidosasa chienouensis =

Scientific classification
- Kingdom: Plantae
- Clade: Tracheophytes
- Clade: Angiosperms
- Clade: Monocots
- Clade: Commelinids
- Order: Poales
- Family: Poaceae
- Genus: Acidosasa
- Species: A. chienouensis

Binomial name
- Acidosasa chienouensis (T.H.Wen) C.S.Chao & T.H.Wen

Synonyms
- Indosasa chienouensis T.H.Wen; Acidosasa glauca B.M.Yang

Species of grass

Acidosasa chienouensis is a species of bamboo native to China. It can reach heights of up to 5 m (16 ft) and a stem diameter of up to 2 cm (0.79 in).
