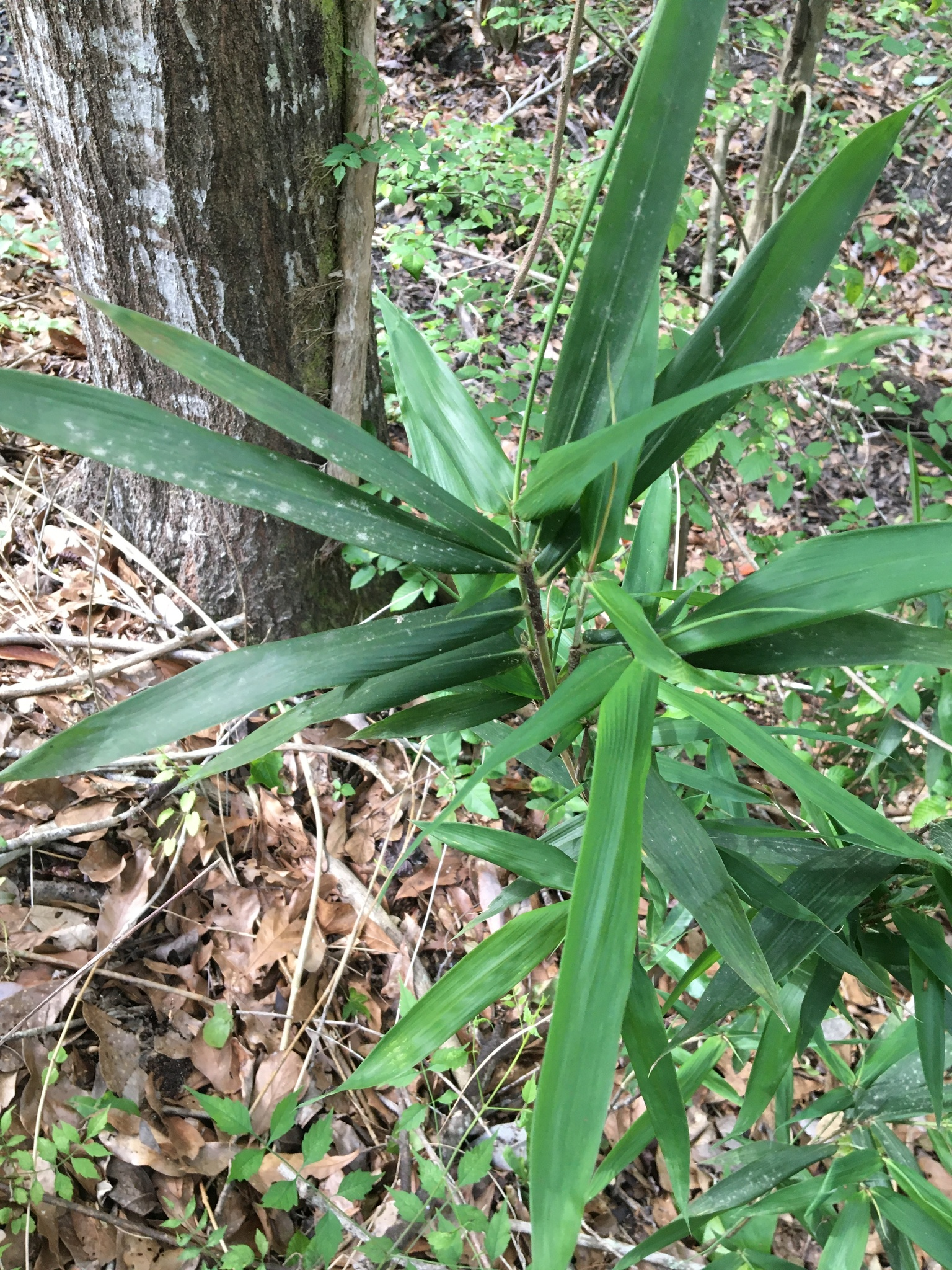

Conservation status
- Secure (NatureServe)

Scientific classification
- Kingdom: Plantae
- Clade: Tracheophytes
- Clade: Angiosperms
- Clade: Monocots
- Clade: Commelinids
- Order: Poales
- Family: Poaceae
- Genus: Arundinaria
- Species: A. tecta

Binomial name
- Arundinaria tecta (Walter) Muhl.

Synonyms
- Arundinaria gigantea subsp. tecta (Walter) McClure; Arundinaria gigantea var. tecta (Walter) Scribn.; Arundinaria macrosperma var. suffruticosa Munro, nom. superfl.; Arundinaria macrosperma var. tecta (Walter) Alph.Wood; Arundinaria tecta var. colorata Rupr.; Arundinaria tecta var. distachya Rupr.; Arundinaria tecta var. pumila (Nutt. ex Rupr.) Rupr.; Arundo tecta Walter; Bambusa pumila Mitford; Festuca grandiflora Lam.; Ludolfia tecta (Walter) A.Dietr.; Miegia pumila Nutt. ex Rupr.

= Arundinaria tecta =

Species of grass

Arundinaria tecta, also known as switchcane or river cane, is part of the Arundinaria genus of bamboo species. Native to the Southeastern United States, the Arundinaria genus is considered to have the only temperate bamboos and has many species that can be hard to differentiate. A. tecta is often confused with A. gigantea and A. appalachiana and may need the combined effort of range, morphology, and genetics to distinguish between the species. Regardless, A. tecta and the Arundinaria genus as a whole have many significant cultural and environmental implications in the Southeastern United States.

Arundinaria tecta, or switchcane, is a bamboo species native to the Southeast United States, first studied in 1813. Arundinaria tecta is very similar in appearance to many other Arundinaria species, making it hard to distinguish between species. It serves as host to several butterfly species. The species typically occurs in palustrine wetlands, swamps, small to medium blackwater rivers, on deep peat in pocosins, and in small seepages with organic soils. The species is only known to occur in the Atlantic Plain, Gulf Coastal Plain, and Mississippi Embayment, though it was earlier thought to exist in the Piedmont and Southern Appalachians as well. Specimens from the uplands are now thought to be a separate but morphologically similar species, Arundinaria appalachiana.

== Description ==
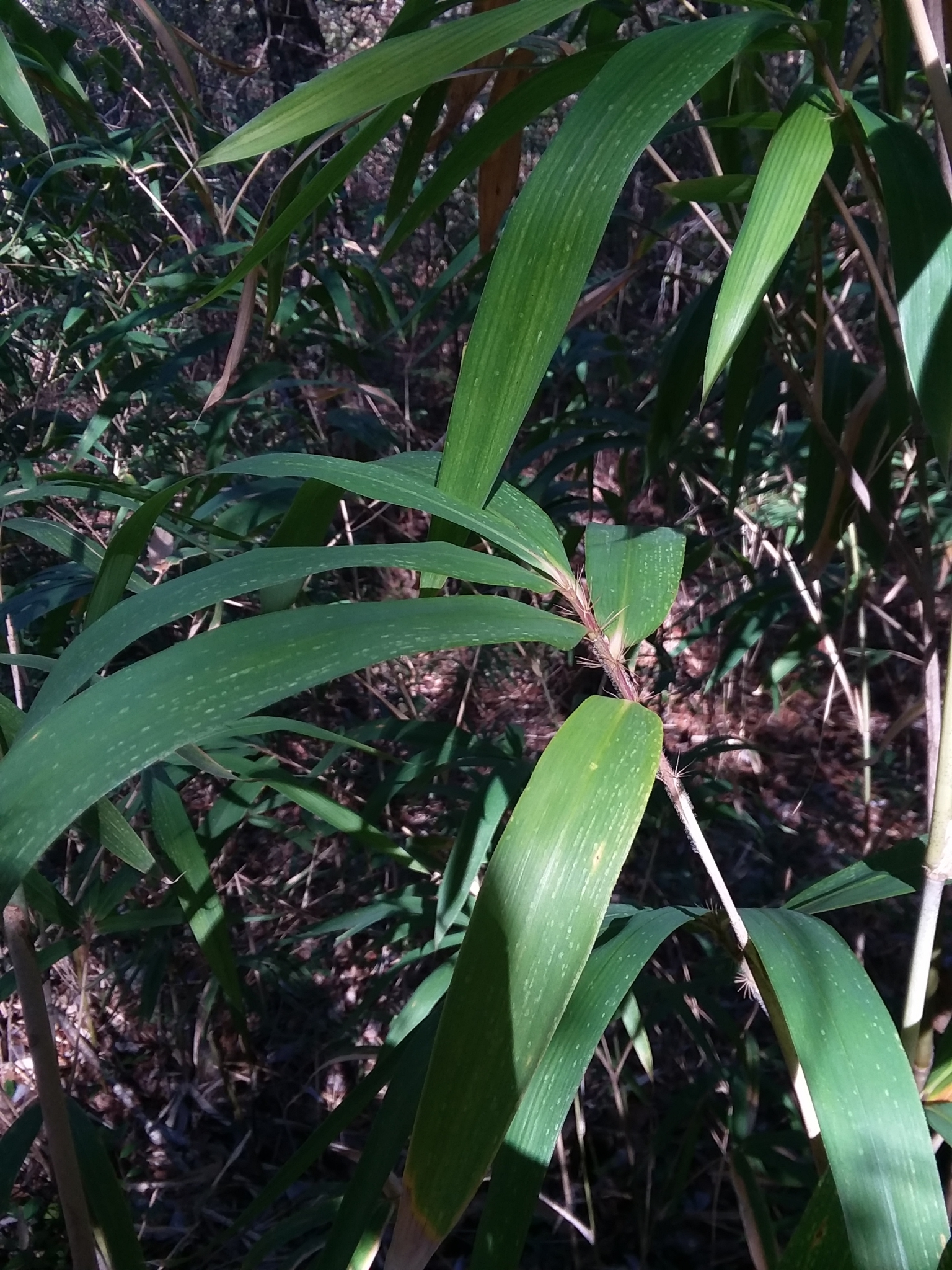
Arundinaria tecta near Brooklyn, Mississippi, USA with topknot and panicles visible

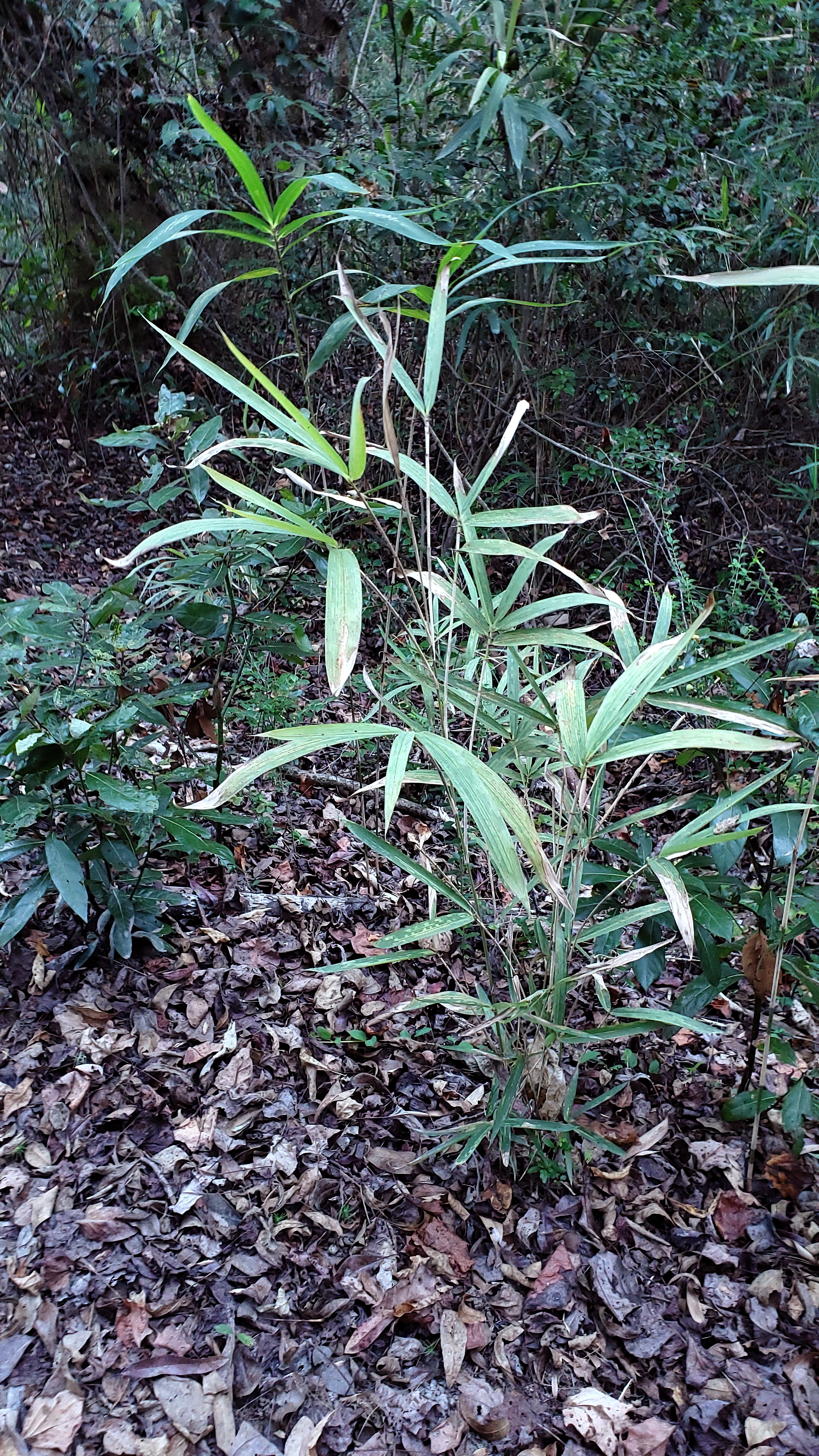
Arundinaria tecta near Columbia, South Carolina, USA

Arundinaria tecta is a low and slender bamboo that branches in its upper half, growing up to 0.6–4 m (2 ft 0 in – 13 ft 1 in) in height. Arundinaria tecta features long primary branches usually greater than 50 centimetres (20 in) in length. The leaves are 8–20 cm (3.1–7.9 in) long and 0.8–3 cm (0.31–1.18 in) wide, tapering in width towards their base. Both leaf surfaces are densely pubescent. The midculm leaves of A. tecta are longer than their associated internodes. The panicles are borne on shoots that grow directly from the rhizomes. Rhizomes feature continuous air canals. Each panicle has a few clustered spikelets on slender branches. These branches have loose sheaths with minute leaves. The spikelets are 2.5–5 cm (0.98–1.97 in) long and have five to ten flowers. The plant flowers from March to June.

== Taxonomy ==
Arundinaria tecta is a monocot from the Poaceae family which is composed of grasses such as cereal grasses, bamboo and grasses used in lawns. This family also includes Asian bamboo species of grass. The Arundinaria genus comprises the cane species of grass. Also called switchcane, the Arundinaria genus is native to the Southeastern United States and considered the only temperate bamboo species. The species was first described by Thomas Walter in 1813 but was used by indigenous groups long before European colonization.

== Distribution and habitat ==
Arundinaria tecta is generally restricted to the Coastal Plains of the Southeastern United States. It can be found in wetlands, bogs, swamps, and sandy stream margins. It is often found in low lying and moist areas like live oak woods and non-alluvial swamps. However, it can still be found in the Blue Ridge and Piedmont areas of the Southeast. Large populations of A. tecta are known as canebrakes and are considered critically endangered ecosystems.

== Phenology and reproduction ==
The phenology and reproductive cycles of Arundinaria tecta are largely unstudied, and what information is available is often conflicting. Some suggest A. tecta flowers in synchrony after periods of 3 to 50 years and then die off in entire stands. Others found that it flowering is unpredictable and on irregular cycles. Life cycles are usually at least several decades. Arundinaria tecta is thought to flower more frequently than its close relative A. gigantia. Flowering generally occurs from February to June and seeds are reported to have low viability rates with only one in 10,000 florets producing viable seeds. There is poor agreement on the flowering cycles of Arundinaria species, but all species are assumed to be wind-pollinated. This is a possible reason restoration efforts for large cane breaks can be difficult with long timelines. Squirrels, quail, turkey, and humans are seed predators of A. tecta.

== Cultural significance ==
Arundinaria species serve as an important plant to many indigenous groups throughout the southeastern United States. Traditionally, Arundinaria tecta and other Arundinaria species have been used as building materials, weapons, hunting/fishing gear, instruments and more. The plants were processed with sharp tools made from stones and sometimes mussels before the arrival of metal in the Americas. The process of weaving a cane basket takes considerable time and energy. Cane has been described as very labor intensive and a challenging raw material to work with.

== Conservation and restoration ==
Arundinaria tecta has suffered large declines and is now limited to remnant populations. Large swaths of cane breaks served as a resource until the arrival of European colonizers. All species of Arundinaria significantly decreased since early colonization, with overgrazing by introduced cattle, land clearing for agriculture, and a disturbance in fire cycles cited as the main causes. The species are considered fire adapted and benefit from routine, low intensity fires. The suppression of fire for a few hundred years is credited to have significantly reduced the health and extent of many Arundinaria species. Arundinaria tecta is considered secure in North Carolina and Virginia but imperiled in Tennessee.

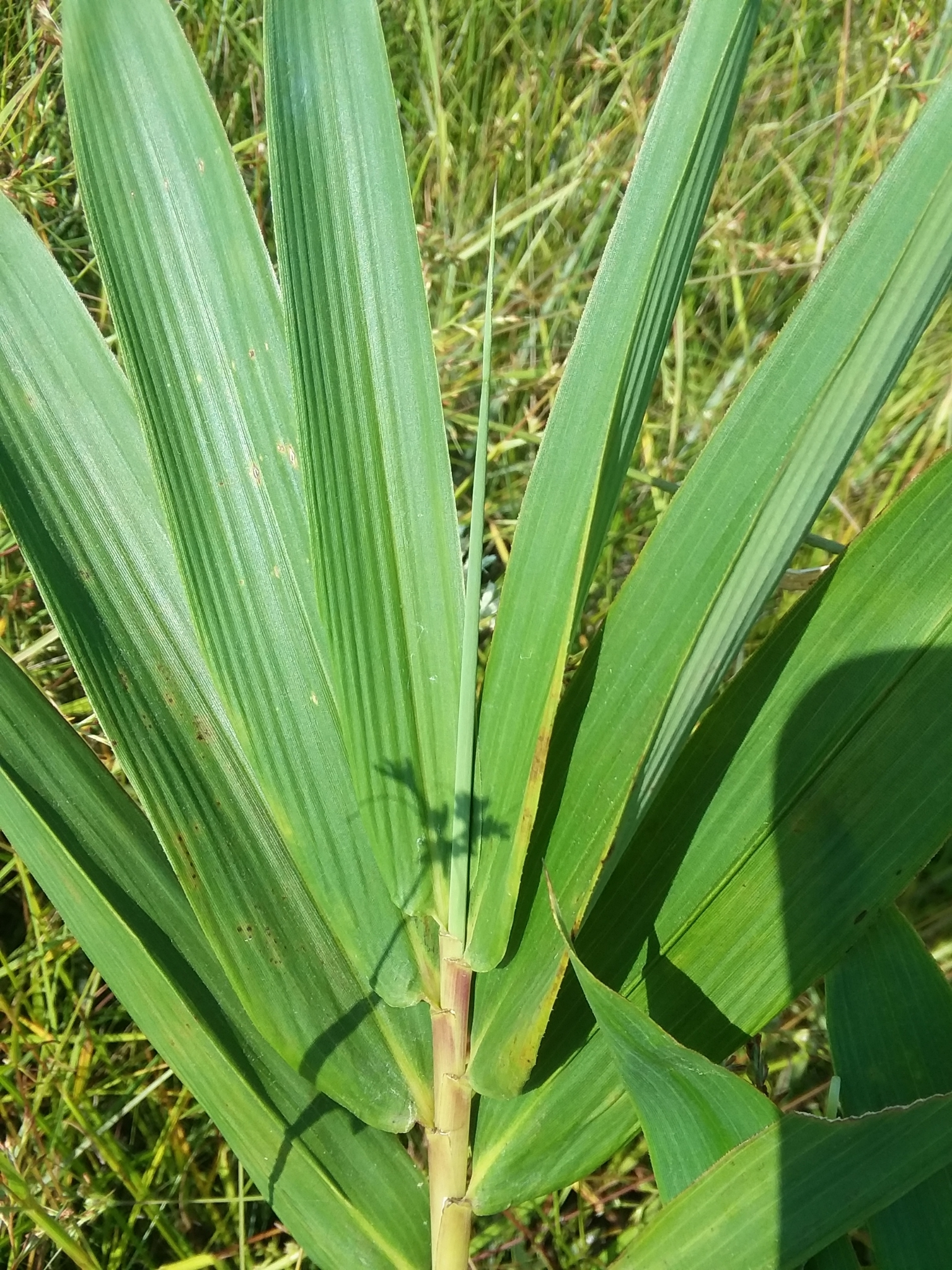
Distinctive Arundinaria 'topknot' at the top of a culm

Canebrakes now comprise less than two percent of their original extent before European colonization. This means genetic diversity and gene pools are significantly smaller than in historic populations which poses challenges for restoration.Canebrakes that remain are often geographically isolated and unlikely to cross-pollinate. Canebrakes are important plant communities because they provide habitat for other organisms, improve water quality, and reduce soil erosion. Restoration projects are therefore not only important culturally to many in the Southeastern United States but also have strong implications for environmental health and biodiversity.

== See also ==
- Canebrake
