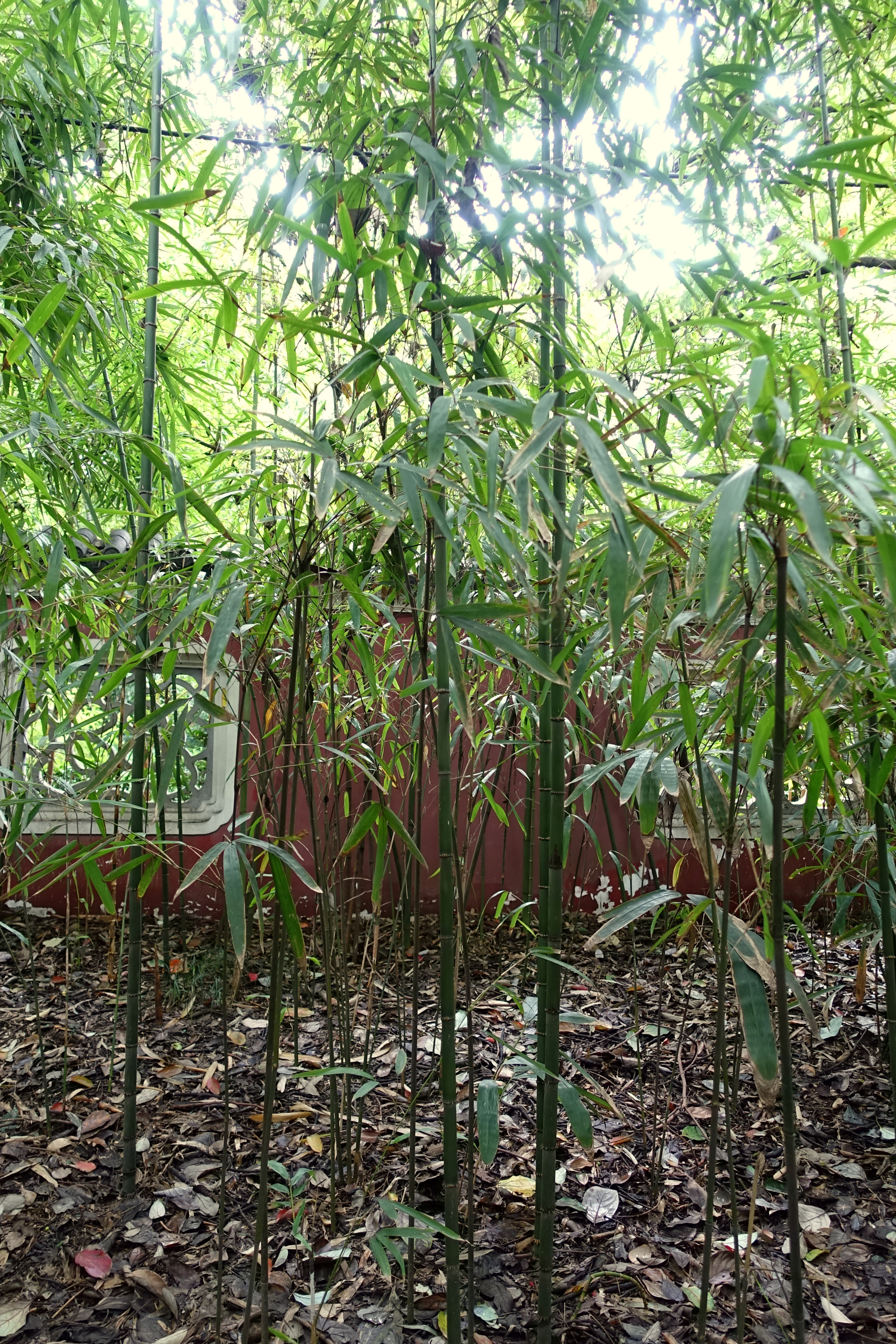
- Acidosasa notata

Scientific classification
- Kingdom: Plantae
- Clade: Tracheophytes
- Clade: Angiosperms
- Clade: Monocots
- Clade: Commelinids
- Order: Poales
- Family: Poaceae
- Subfamily: Bambusoideae
- Tribe: Arundinarieae
- Subtribe: Arundinariinae
- Genus: Acidosasa; Chu & Chao ex Keng f. 1982

Type species
- Acidosasa chinensis Chu & Chao ex Keng f.

Synonyms
- Metasasa W.T.Lin; Acidosasa Chu & Chao 1979, not validly published

= Acidosasa =

Genus of grasses

Acidosasa is a genus of East Asian bamboo in the grass family.

Acidosasa is found primarily in Southern China, with 1 species in Vietnam. Its name is formed from Latin acidum ("sour") and Sasa (another bamboo genus), referring to its edible shoots. Young shoots of the plants are preserved by the local population.

Species

1. Acidosasa breviclavata – Guangdong
2. Acidosasa brilletii – Vietnam
3. Acidosasa chienouensis – Fujian, Hunan
4. Acidosasa chinensis – Guangdong
5. Acidosasa edulis – Fujian
6. Acidosasa guangxiensis – Guangxi
7. Acidosasa lingchuanensis – Guangxi
8. Acidosasa nanunica – Chongqing, Guangdong, Hunan, Jiangxi, Zhejiang
9. Acidosasa notata – Fujian, Jiangxi
10. Acidosasa purpurea – Guangxi, Hunan, Jiangxi, Yunnan
11. Acidosasa venusta – Guangdong

formerly included

see Indosasa Oligostachyum Pleioblastus Pseudosasa

- Acidosasa bilamina – Oligostachyum spongiosum
- Acidosasa denigrata – Pseudosasa hindsii
- Acidosasa gigantea – Indosasa gigantea
- Acidosasa heterolodicula – Oligostachyum scabriflorum
- Acidosasa lentiginosa – Pleioblastus maculatus
- Acidosasa macula – Oligostachyum scabriflorum
- Acidosasa paucifolia – Pseudosasa pubiflora

== See also ==
- List of Poaceae genera
