= Acidosasa edulis =

Scientific classification
- Kingdom: Plantae
- Clade: Tracheophytes
- Clade: Angiosperms
- Clade: Monocots
- Clade: Commelinids
- Order: Poales
- Family: Poaceae
- Genus: Acidosasa
- Species: A. edulis

Binomial name
- Acidosasa edulis (T.H.Wen) T.H.Wen

Synonyms
- Sinobambusa edulis T.H.Wen

Species of grass

Acidosasa edulis is a species of bamboo native to China. It is cultivated for its edible shoots in the provinces of Fujian, Zhejiang and Jiangxi, with yields of up to 20,000 kilograms per hectare.
