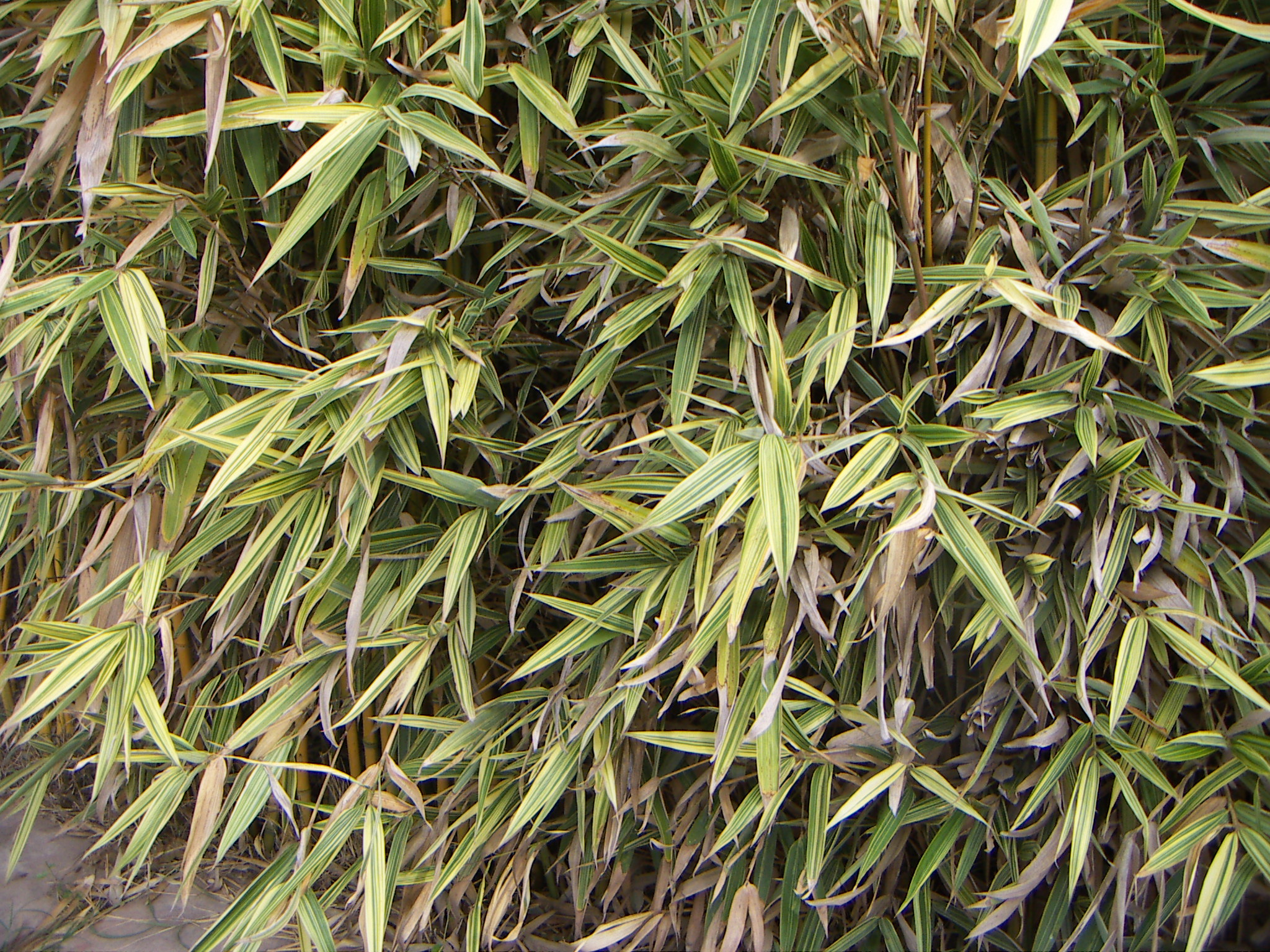
- × Phyllosasa tranquillans

Scientific classification
- Kingdom: Plantae
- Clade: Tracheophytes
- Clade: Angiosperms
- Clade: Monocots
- Clade: Commelinids
- Order: Poales
- Family: Poaceae
- Subfamily: Bambusoideae
- Tribe: Arundinarieae
- Subtribe: Arundinariinae
- Genus: × Phyllosasa; Demoly
- Species: × P. tranquillans

Binomial name
- × Phyllosasa tranquillans (Koidz.) Demoly

Synonyms
- × Hibanobambusa Maruy. & H.Okamurak, not validly published; Semiarundinaria × tranquillans Koidz.; Sinarundinaria × tranquillans (Koidz.) Muroi; Phyllostachys × tranquillans (Koidz.) Muroi; × Hibanobambusa tranquillans (Koidz.) Maruy. & H.Okamura; Sinarundinaria × nipponica Muroi; × Hibanobambusa tranquillans f. kimmei Muroi

= × Phyllosasa =

Genus of grasses

× Phyllosasa is a nothogenus (genus of hybrid origin) of Japanese bamboo in the grass family.

It consists of a single nothospecies of bamboo, × Phyllosasa tranquillans, native to woodland in southern Honshu in Japan. It is considered to be a hybrid between Phyllostachys nigra var. henonsis and Sasa veitchii f. tyugokensis.

It is a spreading, clump-forming bamboo growing to 2.5 m (8 ft) tall, with very dark green leaves 25 cm (10 in) or more in length. The variegated cultivar 'Shiroshima' is found in cultivation.
