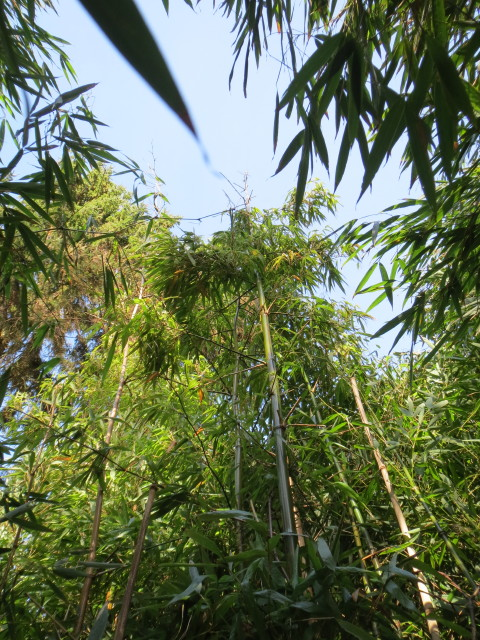
- Oligostachyum sulcatum

Scientific classification
- Kingdom: Plantae
- Clade: Tracheophytes
- Clade: Angiosperms
- Clade: Monocots
- Clade: Commelinids
- Order: Poales
- Family: Poaceae
- Subfamily: Bambusoideae
- Tribe: Arundinarieae
- Subtribe: Arundinariinae
- Genus: Oligostachyum; Z.P.Wang & G.H.Ye

Synonyms
- Oligostacyum Z.P.Wang & G.H.Ye, alternate spelling; Clavinodum T.H.Wen

= Oligostachyum =

Genus of grasses

Oligostachyum is a genus of bamboo in the grass family, native to coastal China.

The genus is sometimes considered a synonym of Arundinaria.

Species

1. Oligostachyum bilobum
2. Oligostachyum glabrescens
3. Oligostachyum gracilipes
4. Oligostachyum hupehense
5. Oligostachyum lanceolatum
6. Oligostachyum lubricum
7. Oligostachyum nuspiculum
8. Oligostachyum oedogonatum
9. Oligostachyum paniculatum
10. Oligostachyum puberulum
11. Oligostachyum scabriflorum
12. Oligostachyum scopulum
13. Oligostachyum shiuyingianum
14. Oligostachyum spongiosum
15. Oligostachyum sulcatum
16. Oligostachyum wuyishanicum
17. Oligostachyum yonganense

Formerly included

see Pseudosasa

- Oligostachyum orthotropoides – Pseudosasa hindsii
- Oligostachyum pulchellum – Pseudosasa cantorii
