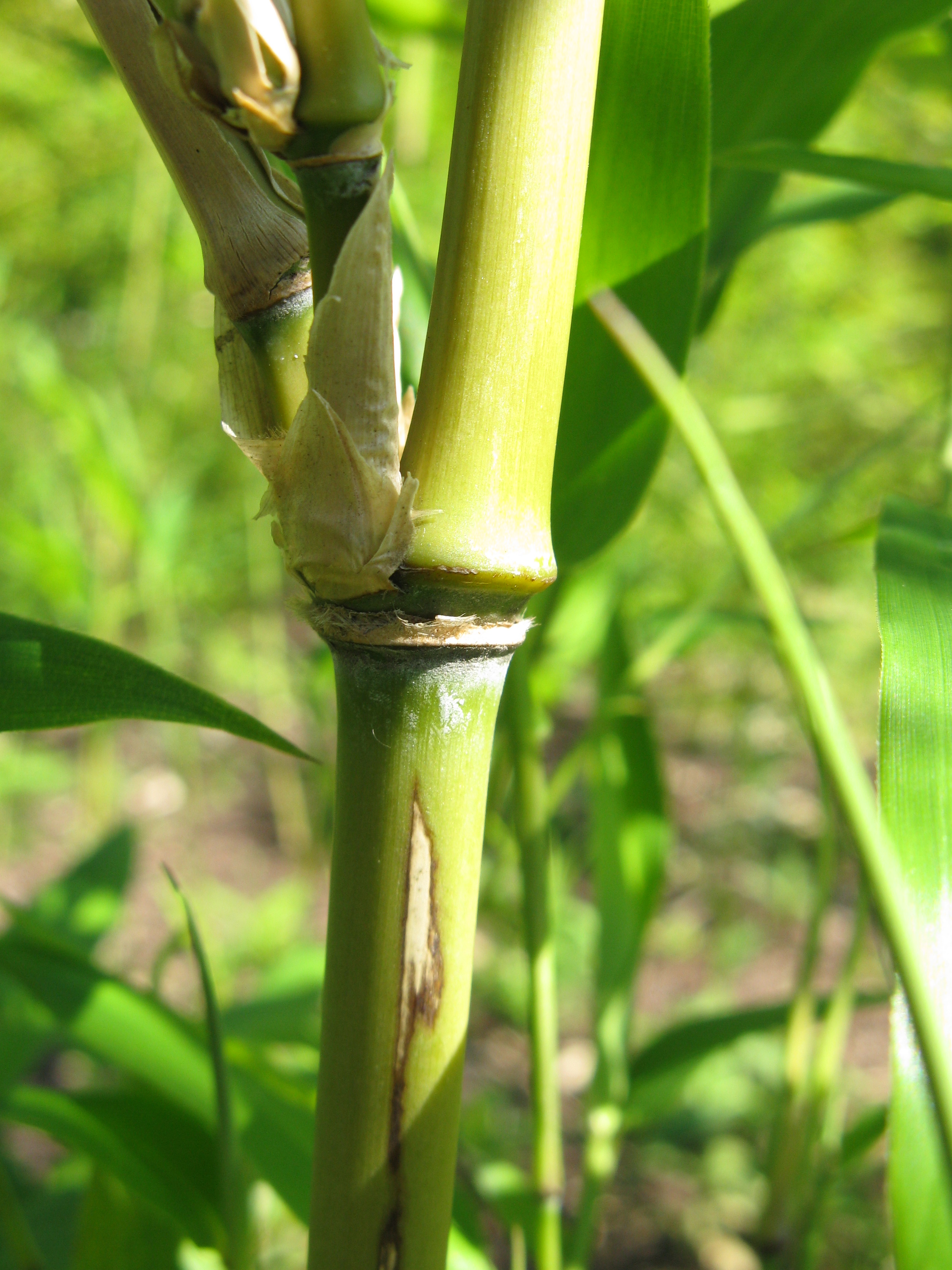

Scientific classification
- Kingdom: Plantae
- Clade: Tracheophytes
- Clade: Angiosperms
- Clade: Monocots
- Clade: Commelinids
- Order: Poales
- Family: Poaceae
- Genus: Sinobambusa
- Species: S. tootsik

Binomial name
- Sinobambusa tootsik (Makino) Makino ex Nakai

Synonyms
- Homotypic Synonyms: Arundinaria tootsik Makino; Semiarundinaria tootsik (Makino) Muroi; Heterotypic Synonyms: Arundinaria dolichantha Keng; Bambos tootsik Siebold; Bambusa tootsik Sieber; Neobambus dolichanthus (Keng) Keng ex Keng f.; Pleioblastus dolichanthus (Keng) Keng f.; Semiarundinaria tenuifolia Koidz.; Sinobambusa laeta McClure; Sinobambusa tootsik f. albostriata Muroi ex Sad.Suzuki; Sinobambusa tootsik var. dentata T.H.Wen; Sinobambusa tootsik var. laeta (McClure) T.H.Wen; Sinobambusa tootsik f. maeshimana (Muroi) Hatus.; Sinobambusa tootsik var. maeshimana Muroi; Sinobambusa tootsik var. tenuifolia (Koidz.) Sad.Suzuki

= Sinobambusa tootsik =

Species of grass

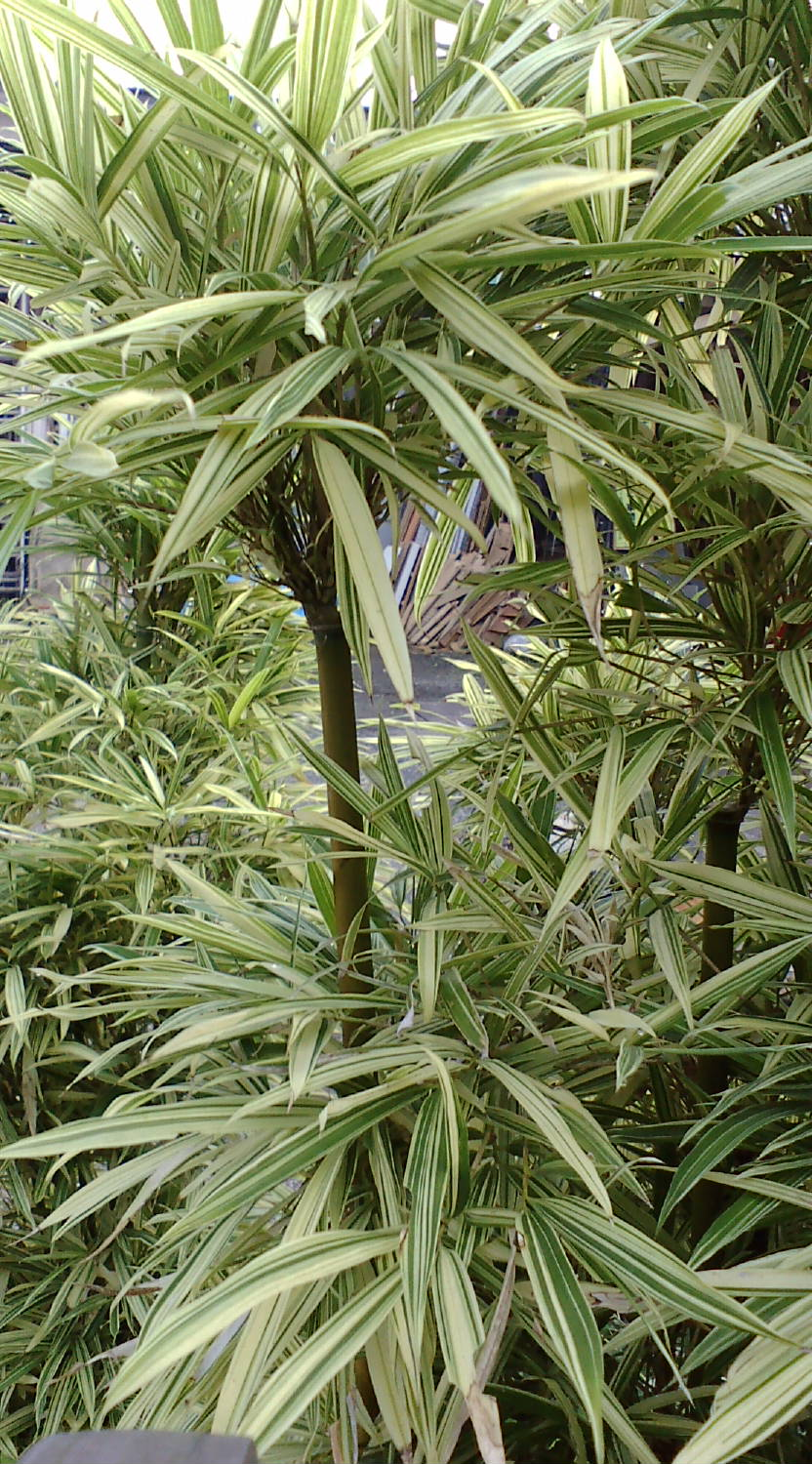
Sinobambusa Toosik, Chiba Japan in 2008

Sinobambusa tootsik, is a species of bamboo in the family Poaceae. It is native to Southeast China and Vietnam and has been introduced in Japan and Nansei-shoto. It grows to a maximum height of 30 feet, with a maximum diameter of 1.5 inches. The culm sheaths are initially red-brown, and basally suboblong and leathery.
