= Pseudosasa cantorii =

Scientific classification
- Kingdom: Plantae
- Clade: Tracheophytes
- Clade: Angiosperms
- Clade: Monocots
- Clade: Commelinids
- Order: Poales
- Family: Poaceae
- Genus: Pseudosasa
- Species: P. cantorii

Binomial name
- Pseudosasa cantorii (Munro) Keng f.

Synonyms
- Arundarbor cantorii (Munro) Kuntze; Arundinaria basiaurita W.T.Lin & X.B.Ye; Arundinaria basigibbosa McClure; Arundinaria cantorii (Munro) L.C.Chia; Arundinaria funghomii McClure; Arundinaria pubiannula W.T.Lin & Z.J.Feng; Bambusa cantorii Munro; Oligostachyum pulchellum (T.H.Wen) Keng f. & Y.L.Yang; Pseudosasa hainanensis G.A.Fu; Sinobambusa pulchella T.H.Wen

Species of grass

Pseudosasa cantorii is a species of bamboo originally from China. It can grow up to a height of 1.5–2 meters.
