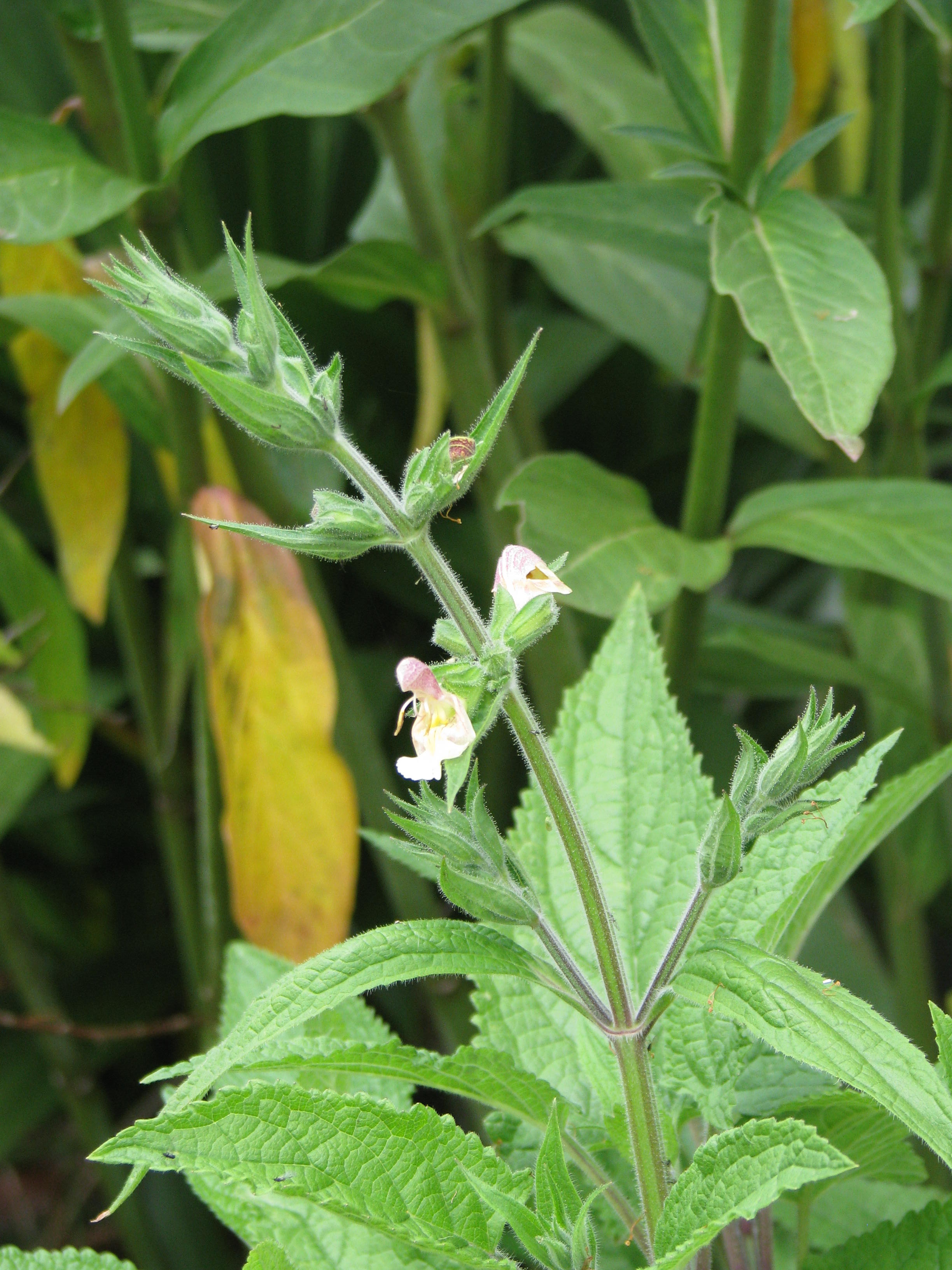

Scientific classification
- Kingdom: Plantae
- Clade: Tracheophytes
- Clade: Angiosperms
- Clade: Eudicots
- Clade: Asterids
- Order: Lamiales
- Family: Lamiaceae
- Genus: Salvia
- Species: S. koyamae

Binomial name
- Salvia koyamae Makino

= Salvia koyamae =

Species of plant

Salvia koyamae (Shinano-akigiri) is a species of flowering plant in the Lamiaceae family. It is a perennial rarely found in the wild and native to the Japanese island of Honshu, where it has a close affinity to two other salvia species: Salvia glabrescens and Salvia nipponica. It was named by Tomitaro Makino, considered the "father of Japanese botany".

Salvia koyamae has a lax habit with decumbent stems reaching 2 feet or more that appear to creep, creating a loose ground cover about 1 foot tall. The large yellow-green cordate leaves are covered with fine hairs, and are 6 in long and 5 in wide with a 5 in long petiole. Pale yellow flowers grow in whorls, spaced on an inflorescence that can reach up to 1 ft long. Few flowers are in bloom at one time, but the heart-shaped leaves and yellow flowers make for an attractive plant. Around 1990 it was grown at the University of California Botanical Garden and introduced into horticulture soon after that.
