= Hiroshi Naito =

Japanese architect

- Born: August 26, 1950 (age 76)
- Education: Waseda University
- Occupation: Architect
- Awards: Japan Architecture Association Award (1992)
- Practice: Naito Hiroshi Architectural Design Office
- Buildings: Toba Sea-Folk Museum; Makino Botanical Garden; Iwami Art Museum
- Website: naitoaa.co.jp

Hiroshi Naito (内藤 廣, Naitō Hiroshi; born August 26, 1950) is an architect from Japan, known for his modern-style buildings. His work includes projects in other countries. He is the principal architect at Hiroshi Naito Architect & Associates in Tokyo. He is professor emeritus at the University of Tokyo and President of Tama Art University

== Life and career ==
Naito was born in 1950 in Yokohama, Japan. He received a M.Arch from Graduate School of Waseda University. He was chief architect at Fernand Higueras in Madrid, Spain, from 1976 to 1978, and worked at Kikutake Architects in Tokyo from 1979 to 1981. Naito established Naito Architect & Associates in 1981.

Naito designed a "dog cooler" for Spitz.

== Works ==
- Toba Sea-Folk Museum, Toba, Mie, 1992
- Chihiro Art Museum, Azumino, Nagano, 1993 and 1993–97
- Autopolois Art Museum, Hita, Oita, 1993
- Wohn- und Atelierhaus, Tokyo, 1995 and 1997
- Ushibuka Fisherman's Wharf, Amakusa, Kumamoto, 1997
- Makino Botanical Garden main building and exhibition building, Kōchi, Kōchi, 1999
- Koga Municipal Park visitor center, Koga, Ibaraki, 1999
- Botanisches Museum, Berlin, Germany, 2000
- Bashamichi Station, Yokohama, Kanagawa, 2004
- Shimane Arts Center, Masuda, Shimane, 2005
- Takayama Station, Takayama, Gifu, 2007
- Bethlehem Library, Medellín, Colombia, 2008
- Hyūgashi Station, Hyūga, Miyazaki, 2008
- Kōchi Station, Kōchi, Kōchi, 2009
- Asahikawa Station, Asahikawa, Hokkaido, 2011
- Toyama Prefectural Museum of Art and Design, Toyama, Toyama, 2017
- Shibuya Station (Ginza Line), Tokyo, 2020, 2020
- Rikuzentakata City Museum, Rikuzentakata, Iwate, 2022
- Naruto City Hall, Naruto, Tokushima, 2024

=== Gallery ===
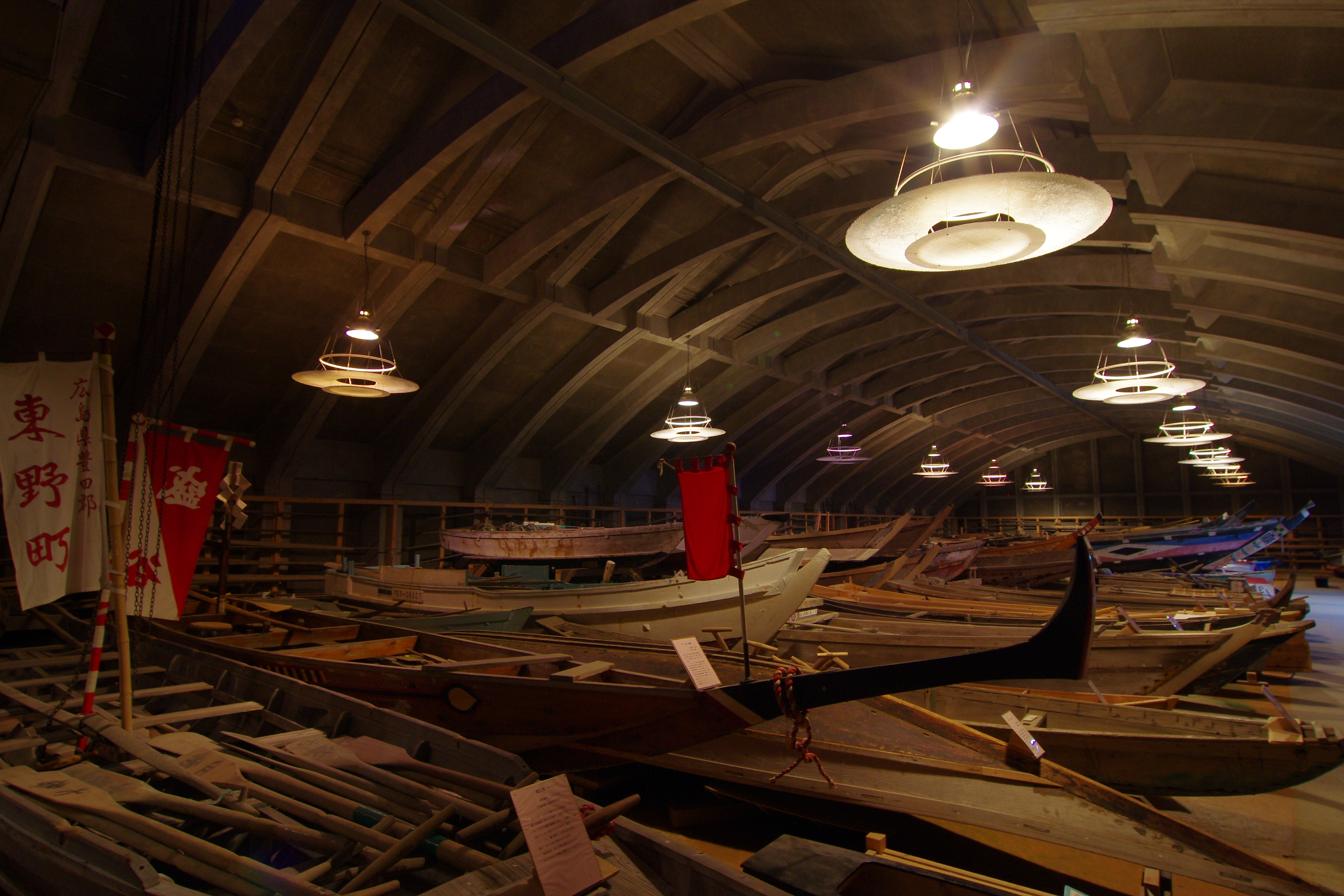
Toba Sea-Folk Museum

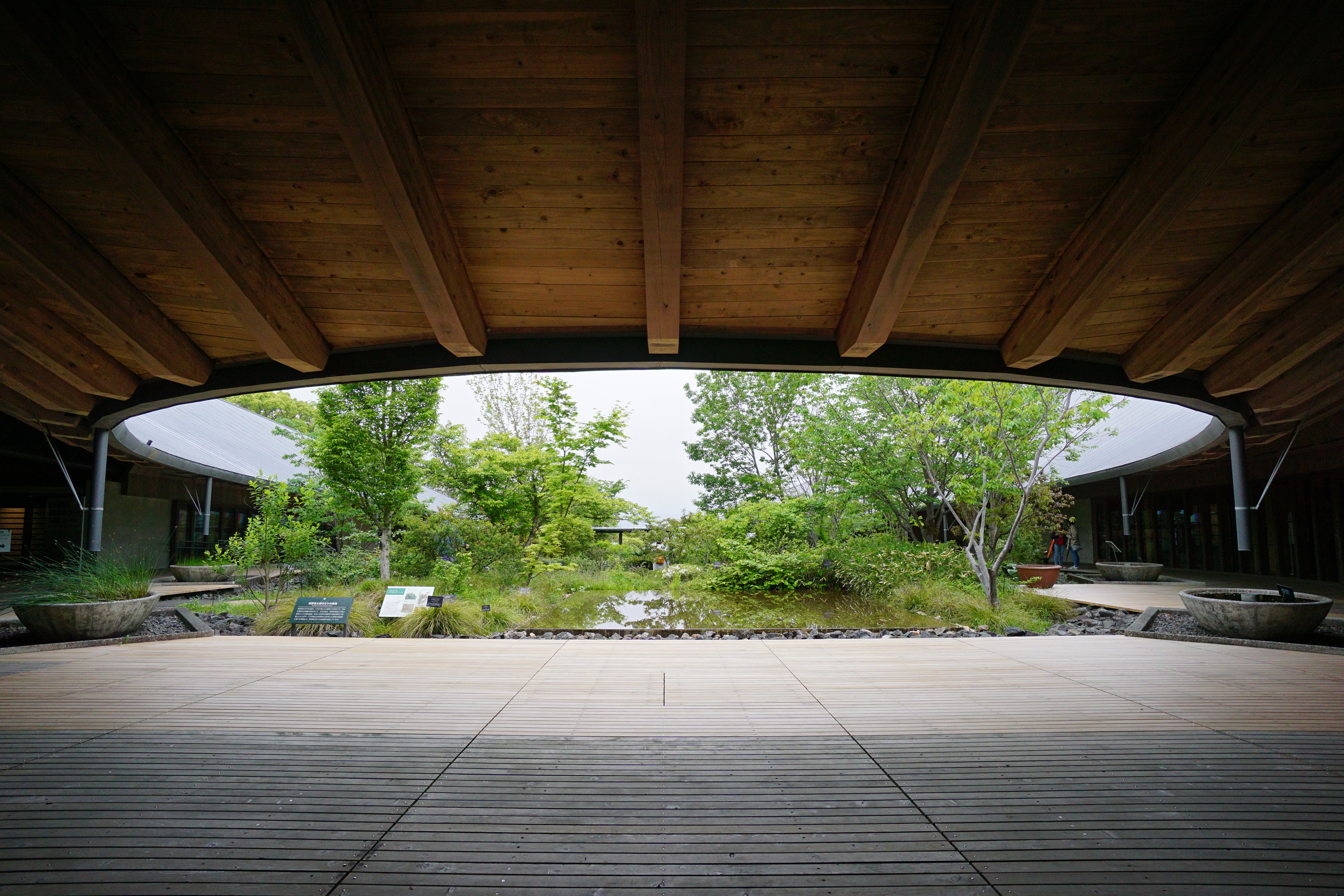
Kochi Prefectural Makino Botanical Garden

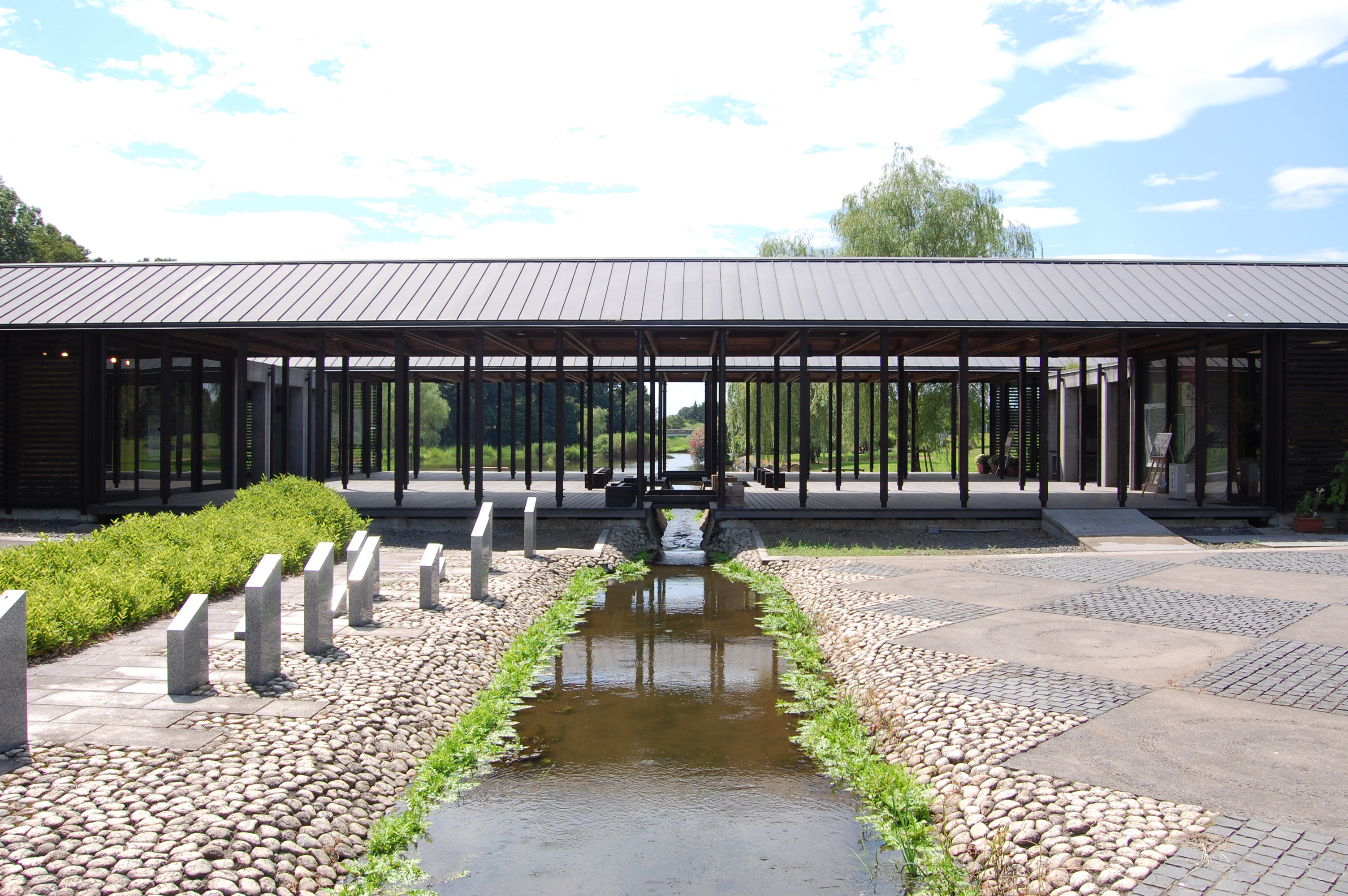
Visitors' Center of Koga Municipal Park, Koga, Ibaraki

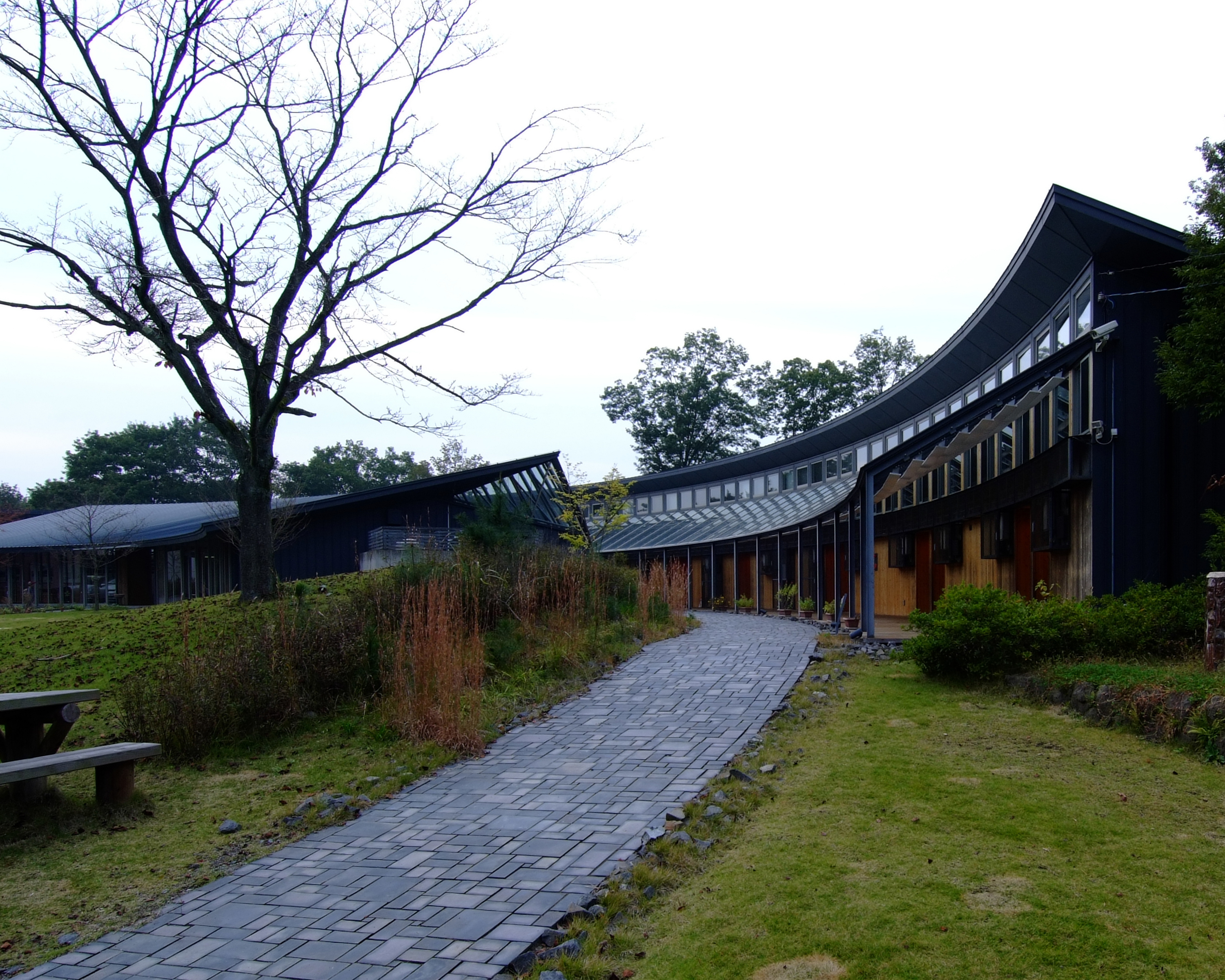
Forest Mashiko, in Mashiko, Tochigi Japan

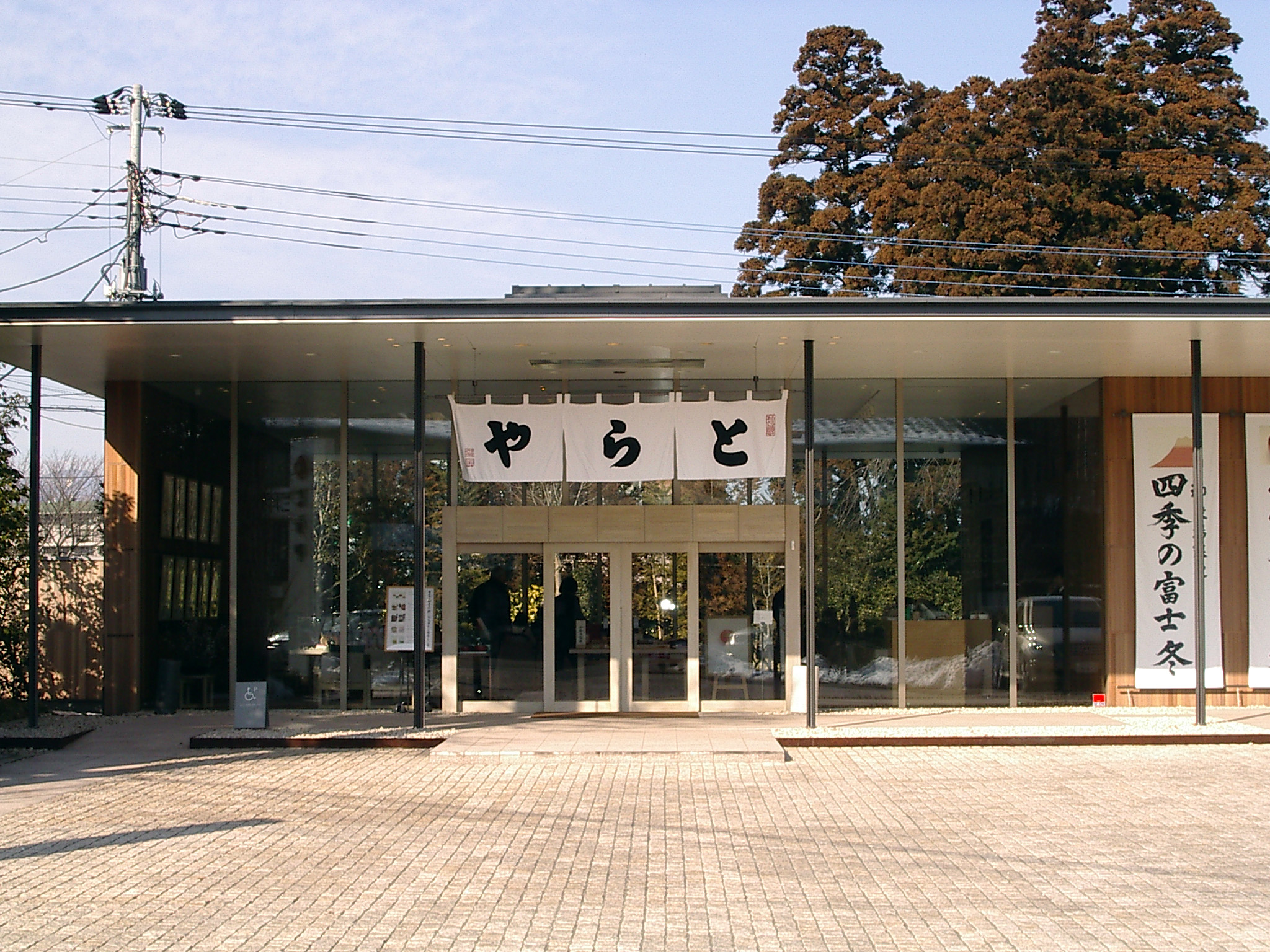
Toraya in Gotemba, Shizuoka, Japan

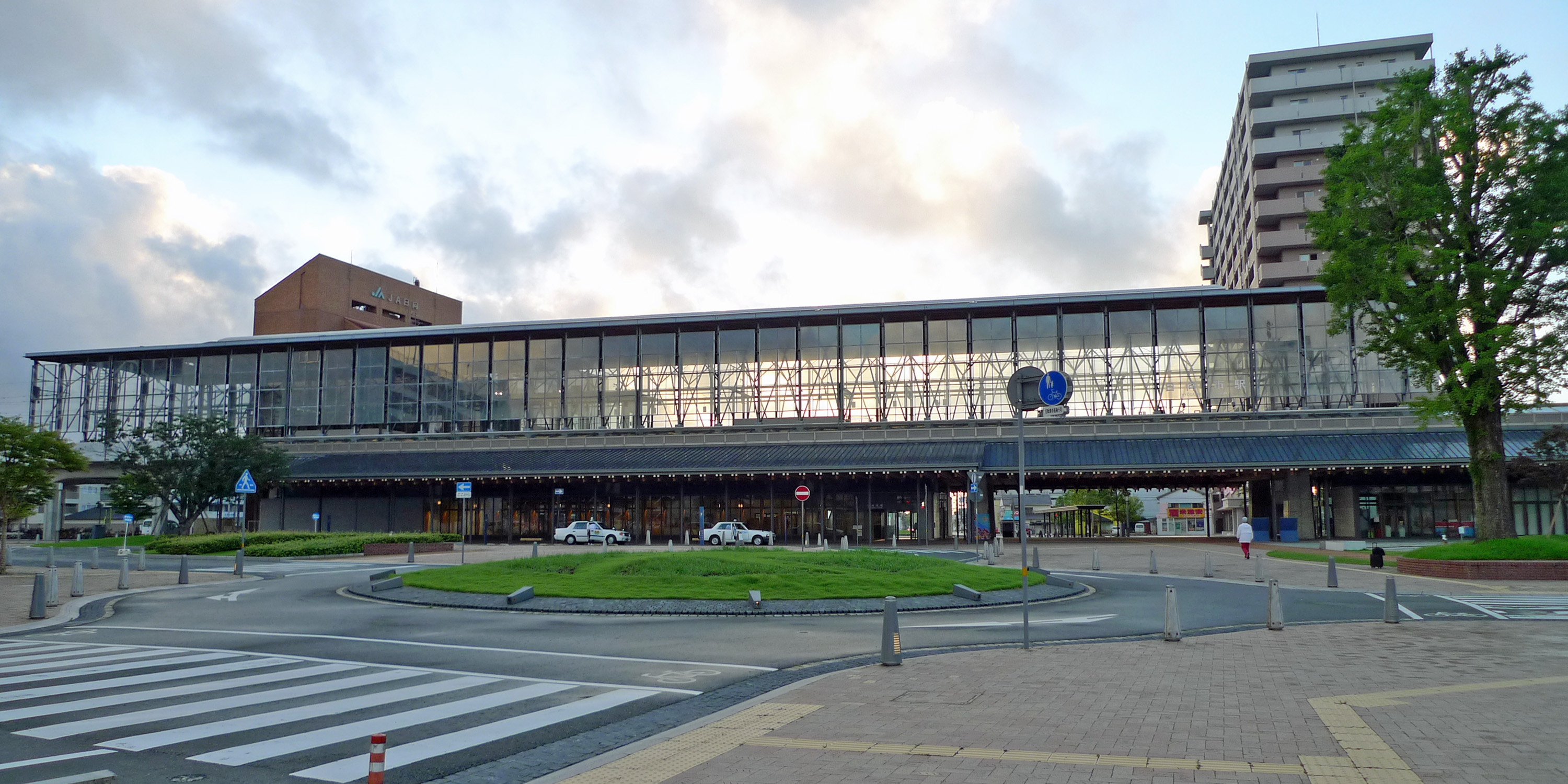
Hyugashi Station west entrance

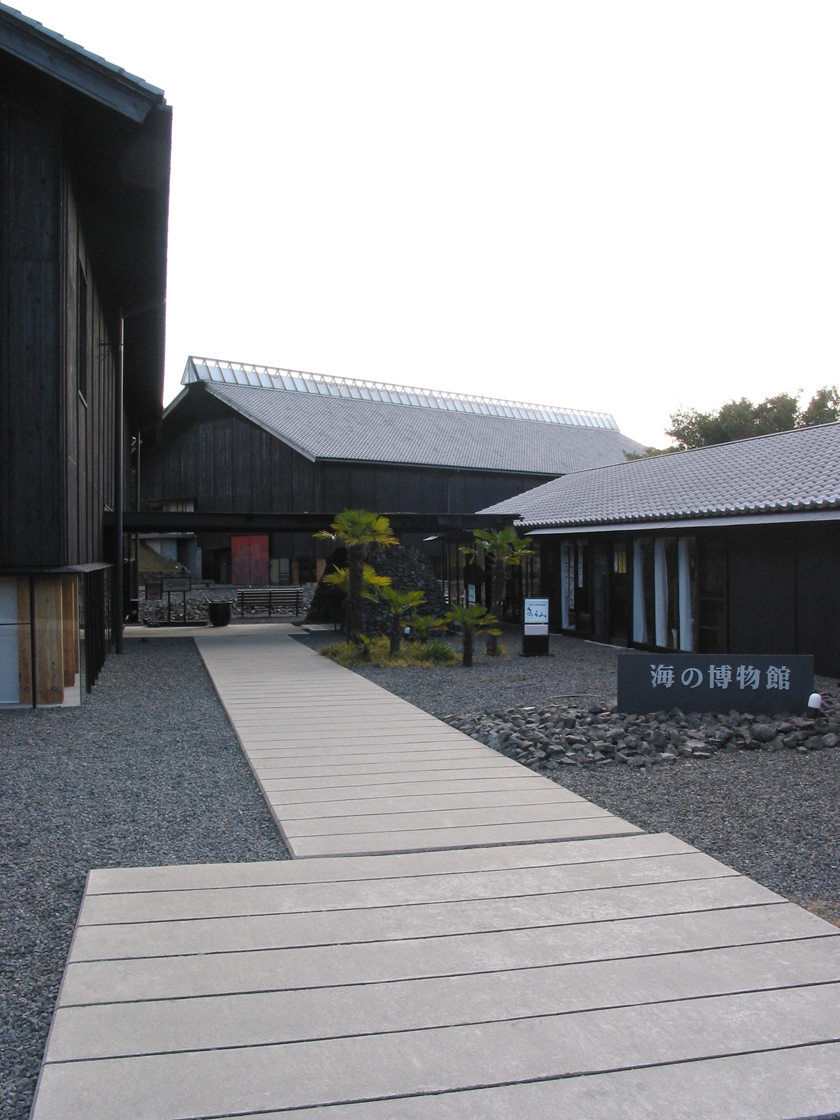
Entrance of the Toba Sea-Folk Museum

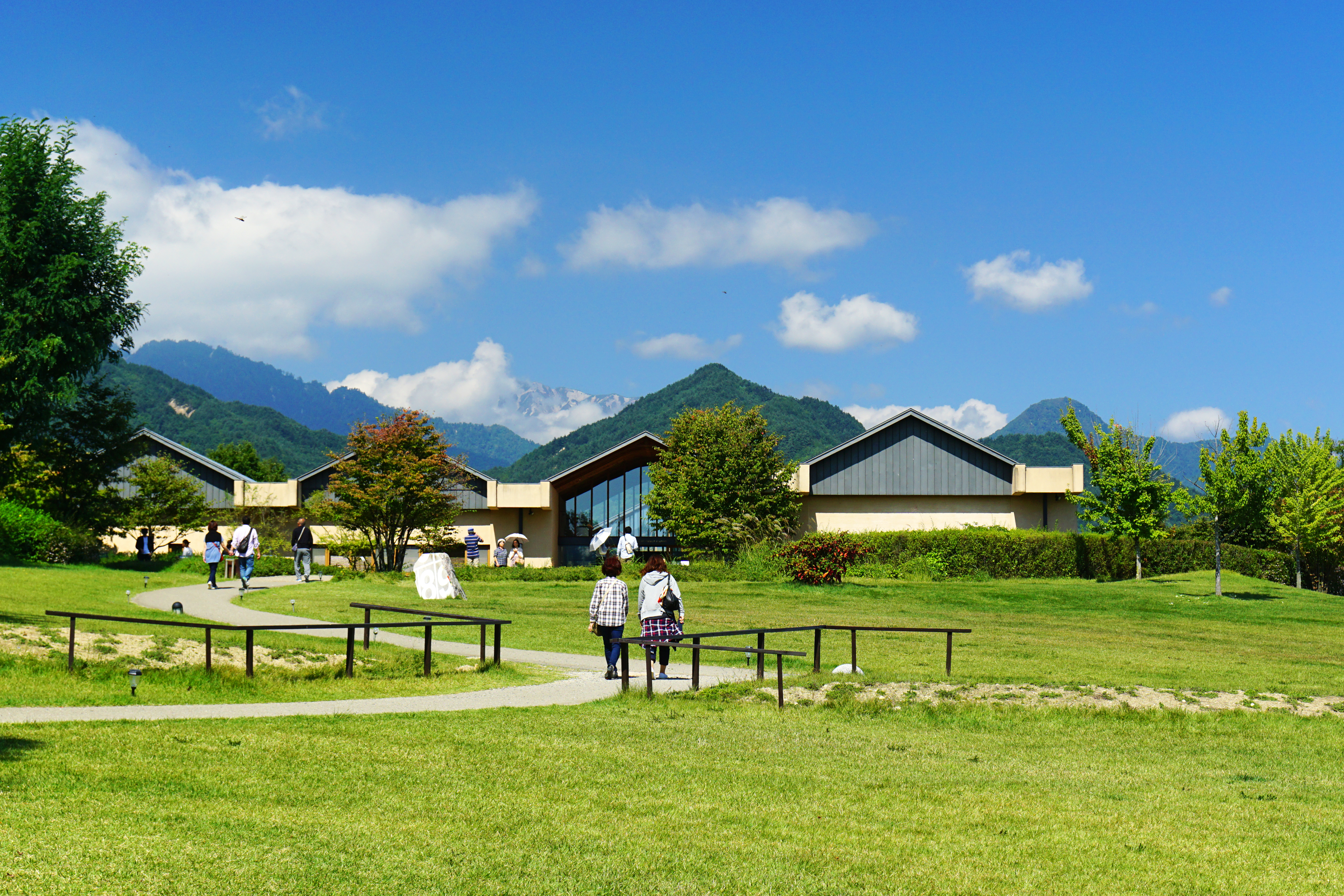
Chihiro Art Museum Azumino, Nagano

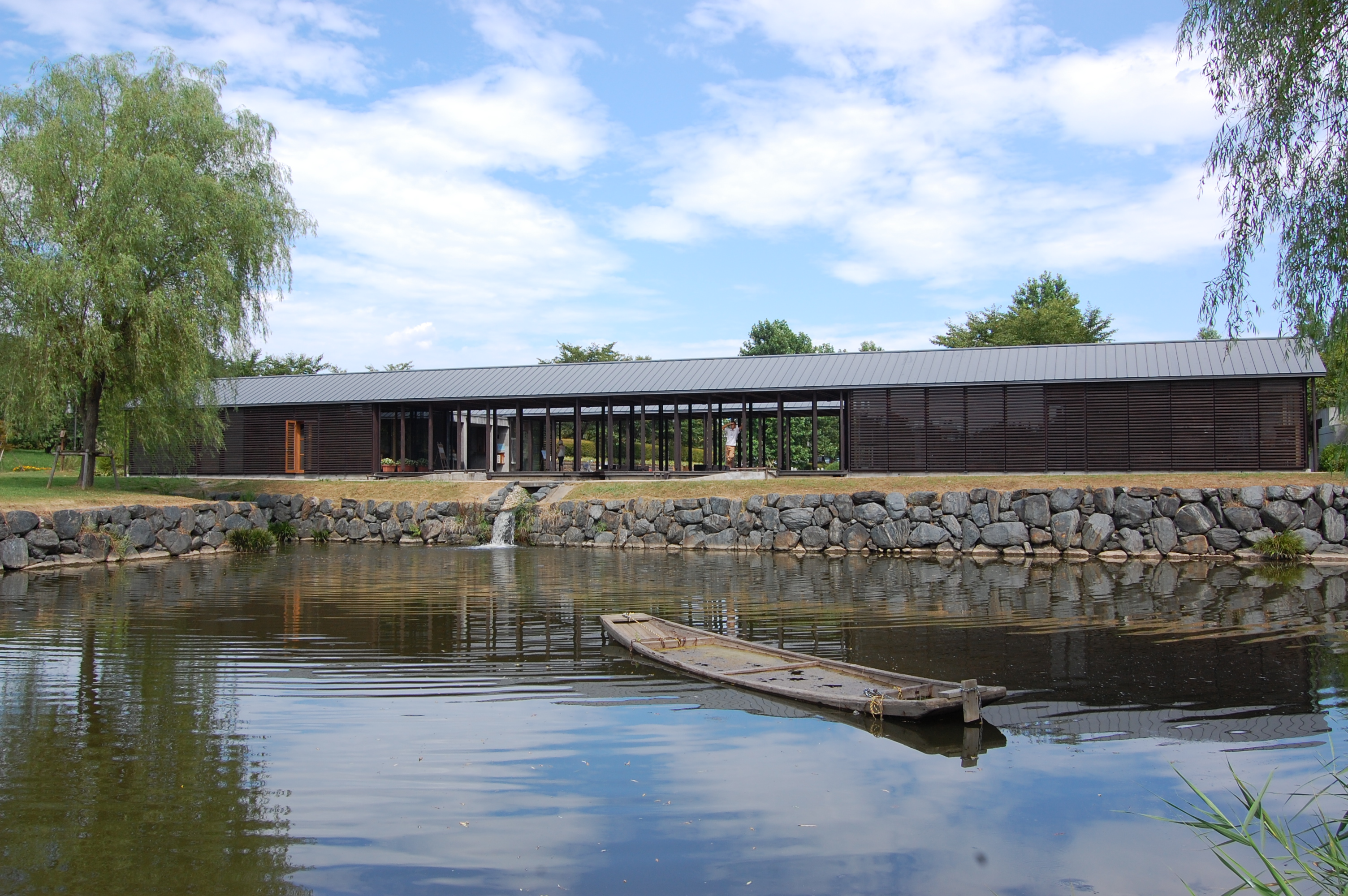
Visitor Center at Koga Municipal Park
