= Yellow sage =

Yellow sage is a common name for several plants and may refer to:

- Lantana camara, native to the American tropics
- Salvia koyamae, native to Japan
