= Apodicarpum =

Scientific classification
- Kingdom: Plantae
- Clade: Tracheophytes
- Clade: Angiosperms
- Clade: Eudicots
- Clade: Asterids
- Order: Apiales
- Family: Apiaceae
- Genus: Apodicarpum; Makino
- Species: A. ikenoi

Binomial name
- Apodicarpum ikenoi Makino

Synonyms
- Apium ikenoi (Makino) Drude

Genus of flowering plants

Apodicarpum is a genus of flowering plants in the family Apiaceae. Its only species is Apodicarpum ikenoi. It is endemic to Japan.
