= Chikurin-ji (Kōchi) =

Shingon temple in Kōchi Prefecture, Japan

Coordinates: 33°32′47.8″N 133°34′38.9″E

Chikurin-ji 竹林寺
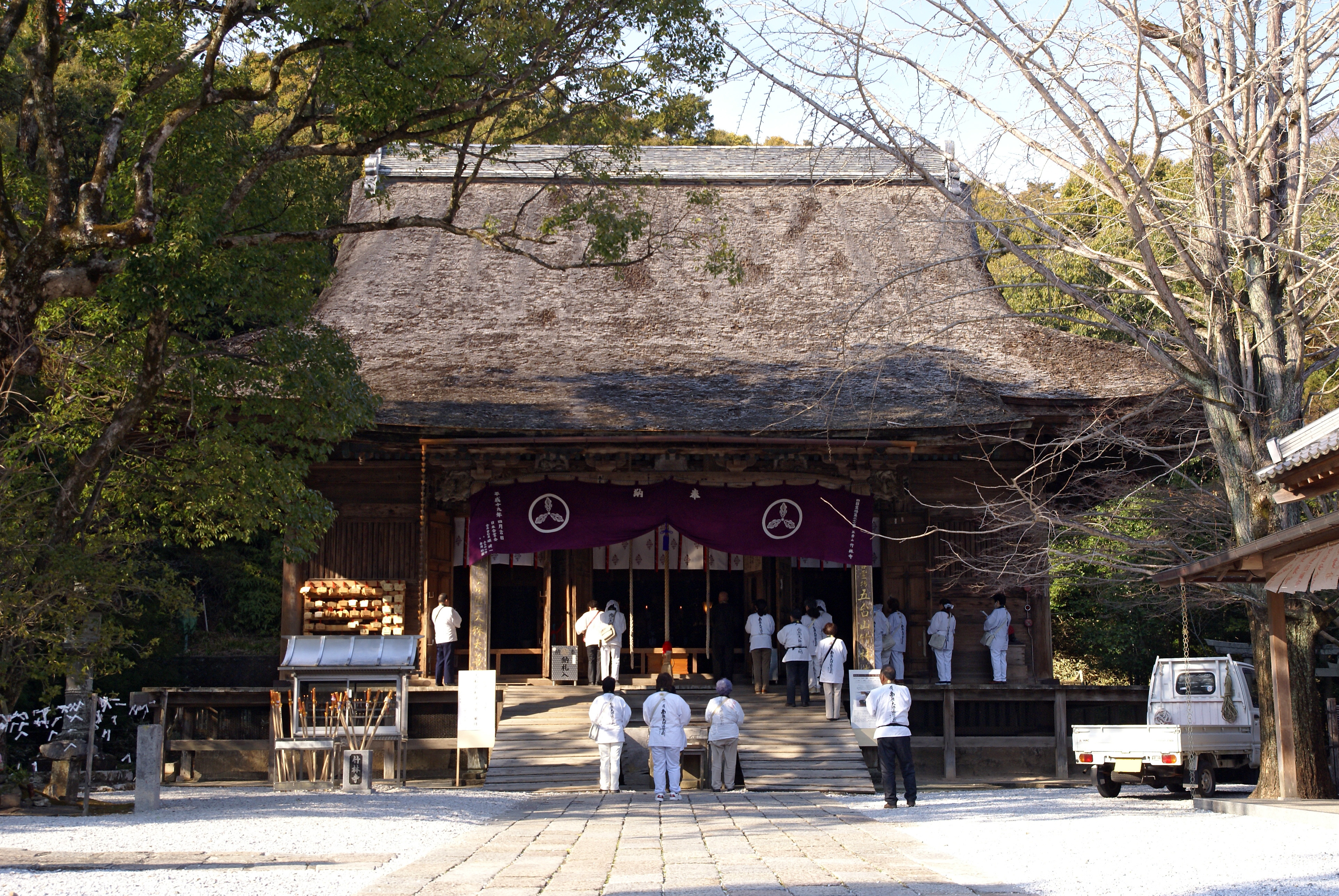
- Hondō, late Muromachi period (ICP)

Religion
- Affiliation: Shingon
- Deity: Monju Bosatsu

Location
- Location: Kōchi, Kōchi-ken
- Country: Japan
- Interactive map of Chikurin-ji 竹林寺

Architecture
- Founder: Gyōki
- Completed: early 8th century

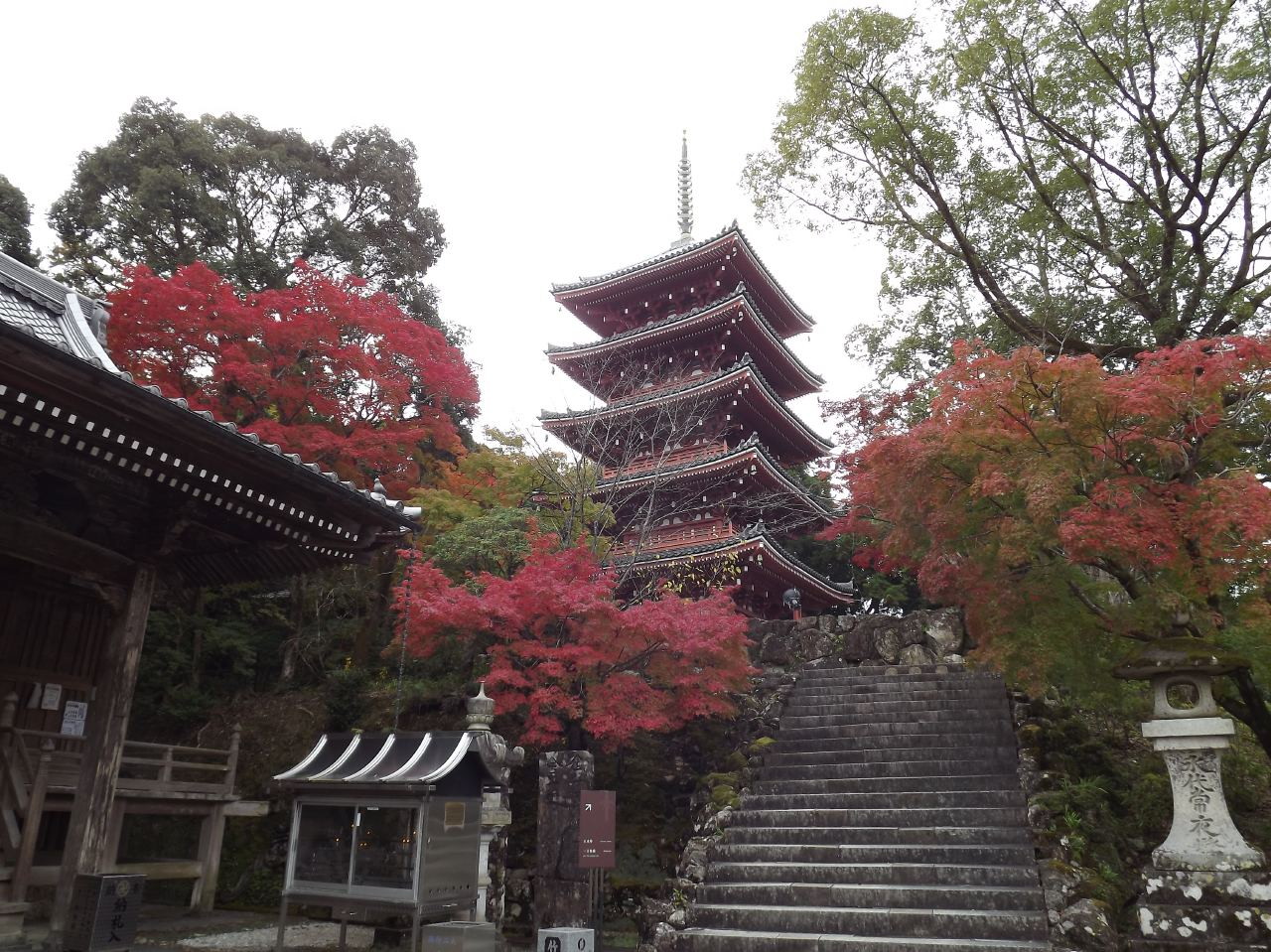

Chikurin-ji (竹林寺) is a Shingon temple in Kōchi, Kōchi Prefecture, Japan. Temple 31 on the Shikoku 88 temple pilgrimage, the main image is of Monju Bosatsu. The temple is said to have been founded by Gyōki in the early eighth century.

The temple houses a number of important sculptures and its late Edo-period gardens are a Natural Monument.

== Buildings ==
- Hondō, late Muromachi period, 5x5 bay, single storey, with a hip-and-gable shingle roof (Important Cultural Property)
- Reception hall, Edo period (Prefectural Cultural Property)
- Sanmon
- Five-storey pagoda
- Shōrō
- Daishidō

== Treasures ==
- Wooden pentad of Monju Bosatsu (late Heian period) (ICP)
- Standing wooden statue of Amida Nyorai (late Heian period) (ICP)
- Standing wooden statues of Tamonten and Zōjōten (late Heian period) (ICP)
- Seated wooden statue of Yakushi (late Heian period) (ICP)
- Standing wooden statue of Jūichimen Kannon (late Heian period) (ICP)
- Seated wooden statue of Shaka Nyorai (late Heian period) (ICP)
- Standing wooden statue of Seishi Bosatsu (late Heian period) (ICP)
- Wooden statue of Daiitoku Myōō seated on a cow (Kamakura period) (ICP)
- Seated wooden statue of Aizen Myōō (Kamakura period) (ICP)
- Standing wooden statue of Senjū Kannon (Kamakura period) (ICP)
- Seated wooden statue of Amida Nyorai (Kamakura period) (ICP)
- Standing wooden statue of Byakue Kannon (Muromachi period) (ICP)
- Standing wooden statue of Batō Kannon (Muromachi period) (ICP)
- Seated wooden statue of Dainichi Nyorai (Muromachi period) (ICP)
- Kakebotoke with seated Monju Bosatsu (1654) (Prefectural Cultural Property)
- Temple bell (1284) (Prefectural Cultural Property)

== See also ==
- Shikoku 88 temple pilgrimage
- Makino Botanical Garden
- Japanese sculpture
