= Toba Sea-Folk Museum =

Fishing museum in Toba, Japan

- 鳥羽市立海の博物館
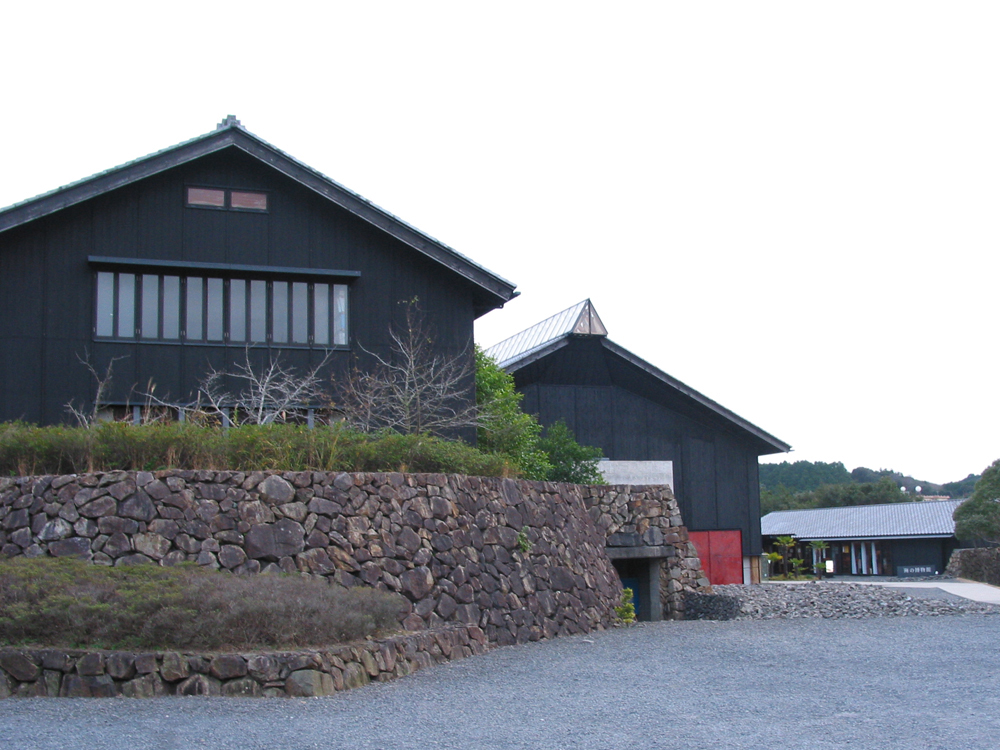
- Interactive map of the Toba Sea-Folk Museum area

General information
- Location: 1731-68 Uramura-chō, Toba, Mie Prefecture, Japan
- Coordinates: 34°26′57″N 136°53′58″E
- Opened: 7 December 1971
- Renovated: 14 July 1992

Design and construction
- Architect: Naitō Hiroshi

Website
- Official website

Toba Sea-Folk Museum (鳥羽市立海の博物館, Toba Shiritsu Umi no Hakubutsukan) is a museum dedicated to the area's fishing traditions in Toba, Mie Prefecture, Japan. Having first opened as the private Sea-Folk Museum in 1971, the museum reopened in its current location in 1992, and in 2017 was reestablished as a public, municipal museum under its current name. In 1998, the museum buildings, designed by Naitō Hiroshi, were included amongst the 100 Select Instances of Public Architecture (公共建築百選) by the then Ministry of Construction. The collection, numbering some 61,840 items as of 31 March 2018, includes some ninety wooden boats from all over Japan, the nation's most comprehensive assemblage of materials relating to the Ama, and a grouping of 6,879 pieces of Ise Bay, Shima Peninsula, and Kumano Sea Fishing Equipment that have been jointly designated an Important Tangible Folk Cultural Property. The displays are organized around seven themes: traditions of sea-folk, sea-folk faith and festivals, sea pollution, Ama divers in Shima, fishing in Ise Bay, fishing in Shima and Kumano, and wooden boats and navigation.

== See also ==
- Ise-Shima National Park
- Ise Jingū, Meoto Iwa
- Mikimoto Pearl Island
- Japan Heritage Story #073
- Mie Prefectural Museum
