= Salvia nipponica =

- Salvia nipponica

Scientific classification
- Kingdom: Plantae
- Clade: Tracheophytes
- Clade: Angiosperms
- Clade: Eudicots
- Clade: Asterids
- Order: Lamiales
- Family: Lamiaceae
- Genus: Salvia
- Species: S. nipponica

Binomial name
- Salvia nipponica Miq.

Species of flowering plant

Salvia nipponica is a perennial plant that is native to Japan and Taiwan. Stems grow from 20 to 50 cm (7.9 to 19.7 in), with triangular-ovate to triangular-hastate leaves that are typically 2 to 7 cm (0.79 to 2.76 in) by 1.3 to 6 cm (0.51 to 2.36 in). The 2.2 to 2.4 cm (0.87 to 0.94 in) flowers have many hairs, with a yellow corolla that has a red spot.
