= Makino Botanical Garden =

Botanical garden in Kōchi Prefecture, Japan

- Japanese: 高知県立牧野植物園, romanized: Kōchi Kenritsu Makino Shokubutsuen
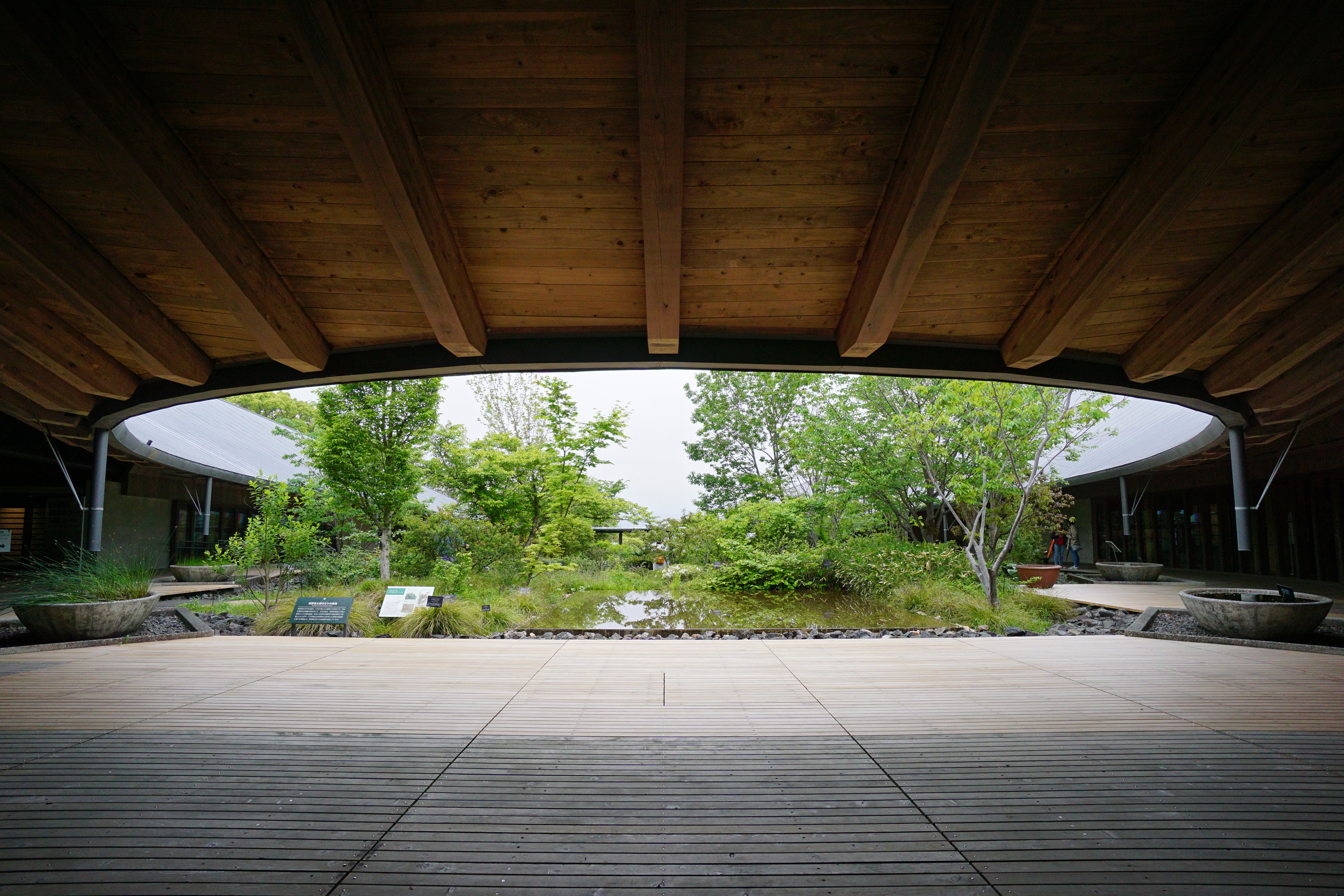
- Tomitaro Makino Memorial Hall Pavilion

- Location within Kochi Prefecture Location within Japan
- Type: Botanical garden
- Location: Kōchi Prefecture, Japan
- Nearest city: Kōchi
- Coordinates: 33°32′48″N 133°34′40″E
- Created: 1958
- Website: www.makino.or.jp

The Makino Botanical Garden (高知県立牧野植物園, Kōchi Kenritsu Makino Shokubutsuen), also known as the Kochi Prefectural Makino Botanical Garden, is a botanical garden located at Godaisan 4200-6, Kōchi, Kōchi Prefecture, Japan. It is open to the public daily except Mondays; an admission fee is charged.

The garden was established in 1958 with a museum dedicated to Tomitaro Makino (1862-1957), the "Father of Japanese Botany", and a research laboratory. Today its collections include Japanese Rhododendron, Acer, Chrysanthemum, serpentine plants, limestone plants, plants of the Sohayaki region, and wild plants of Kōchi Prefecture region.

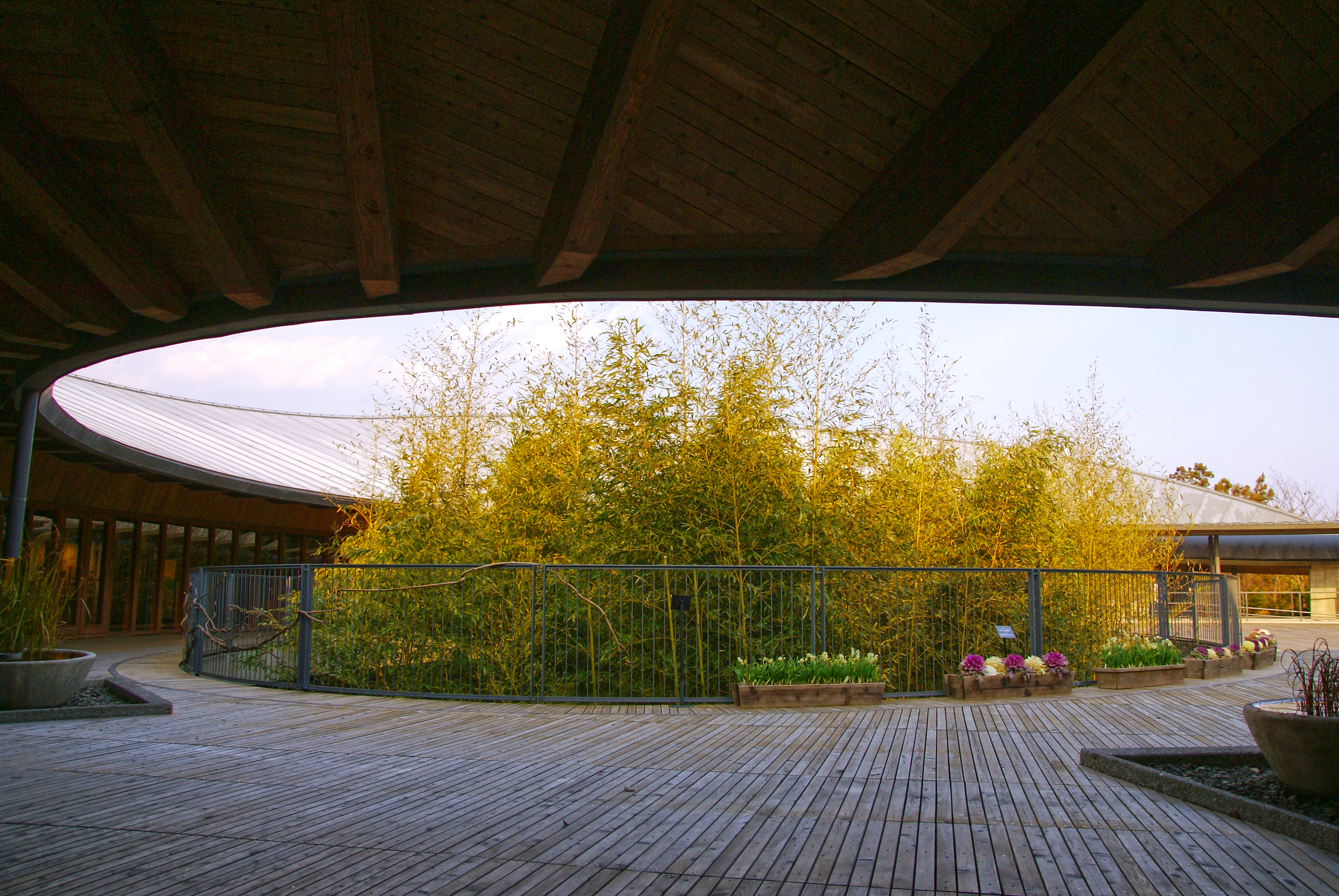
Tomitaro Makino Memorial Hall Museum

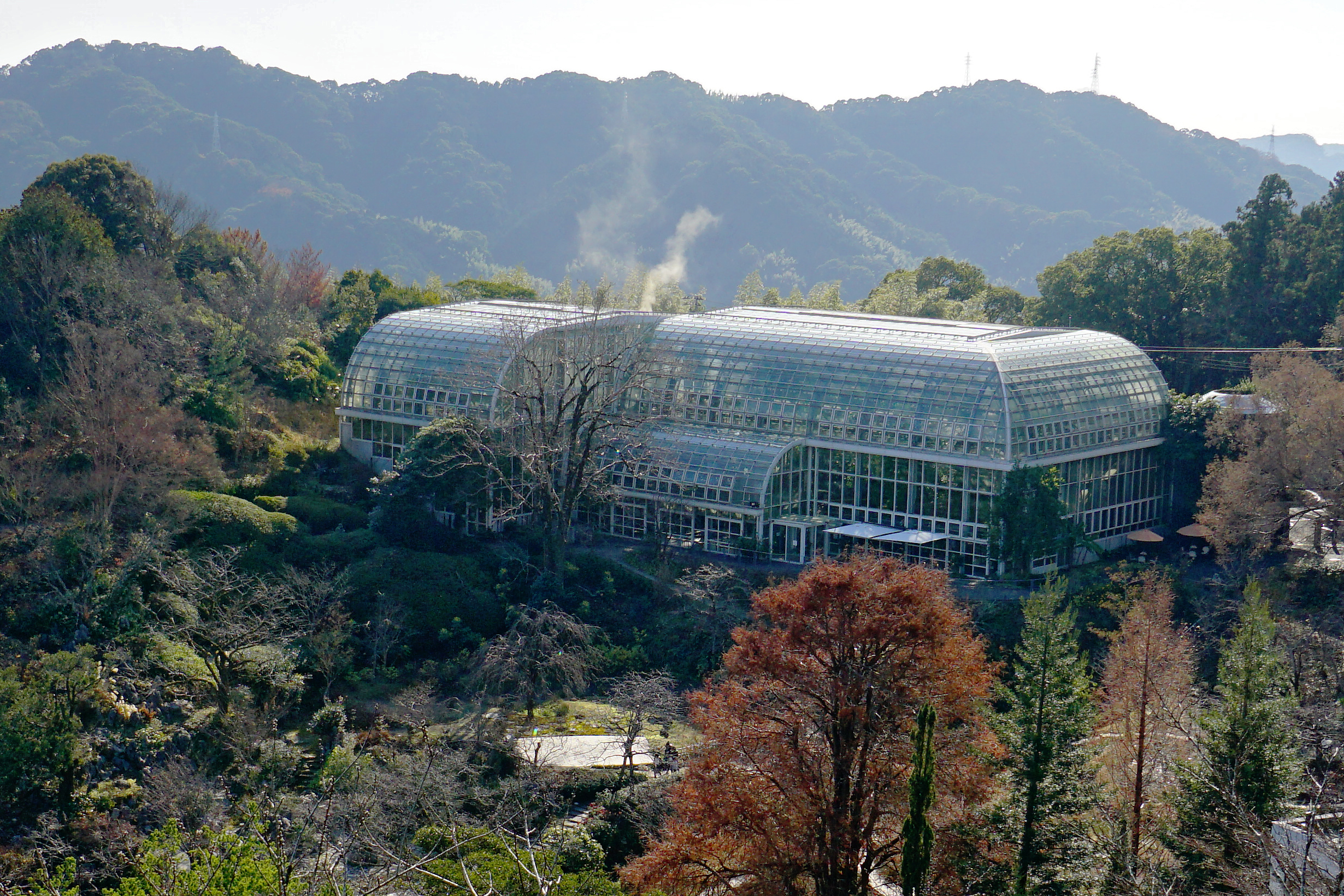
Greenhouse

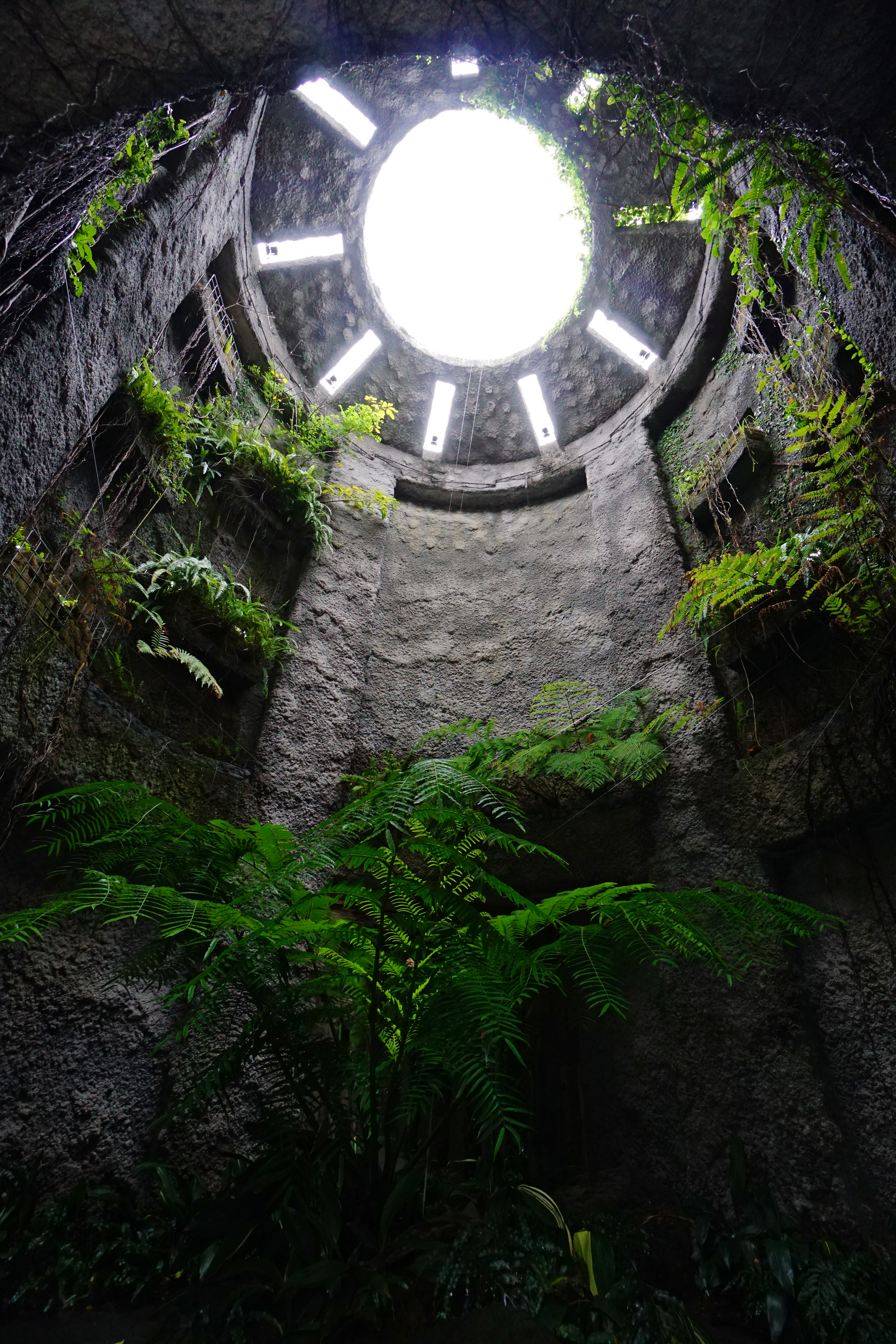
Green Tower

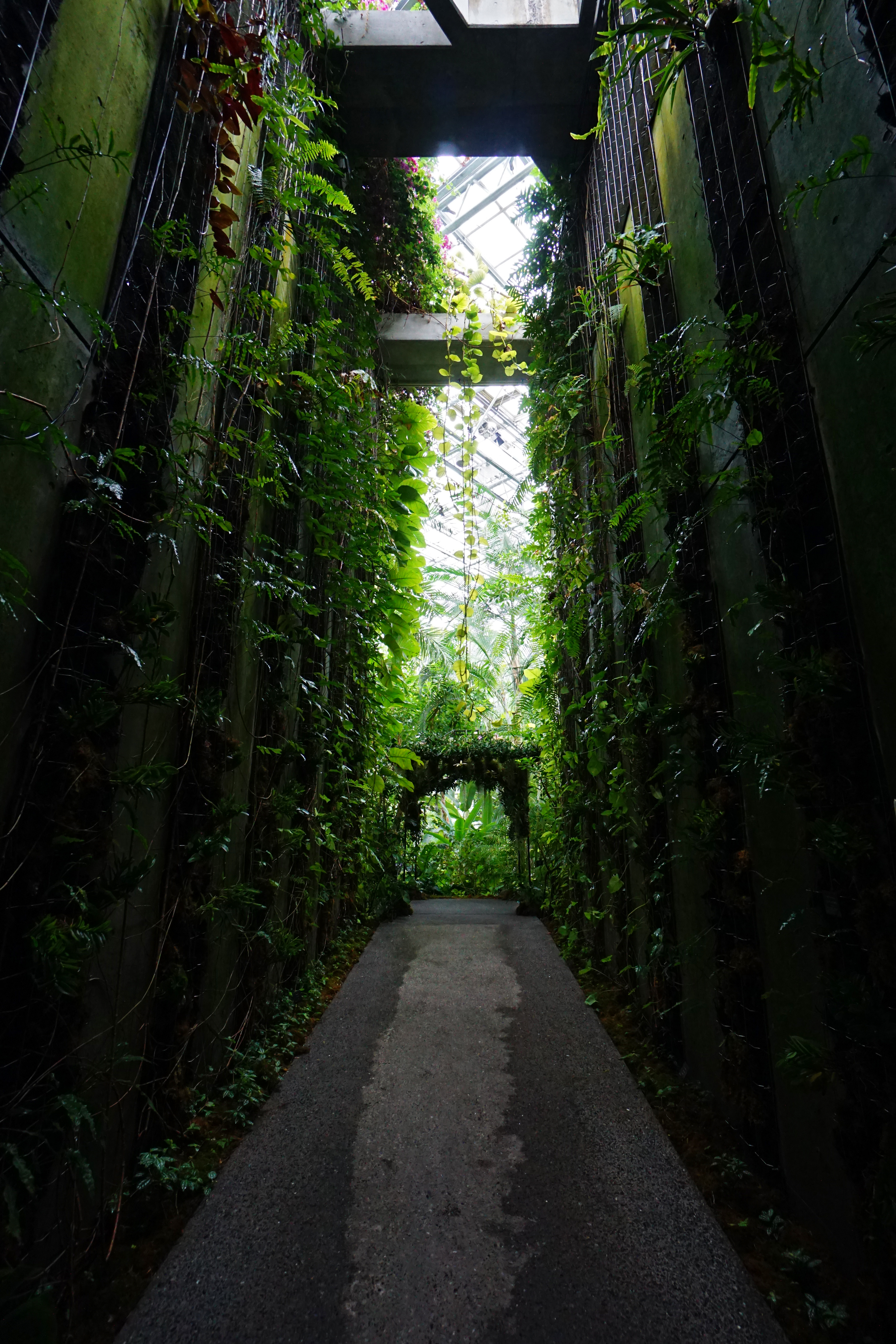
Green Corridor

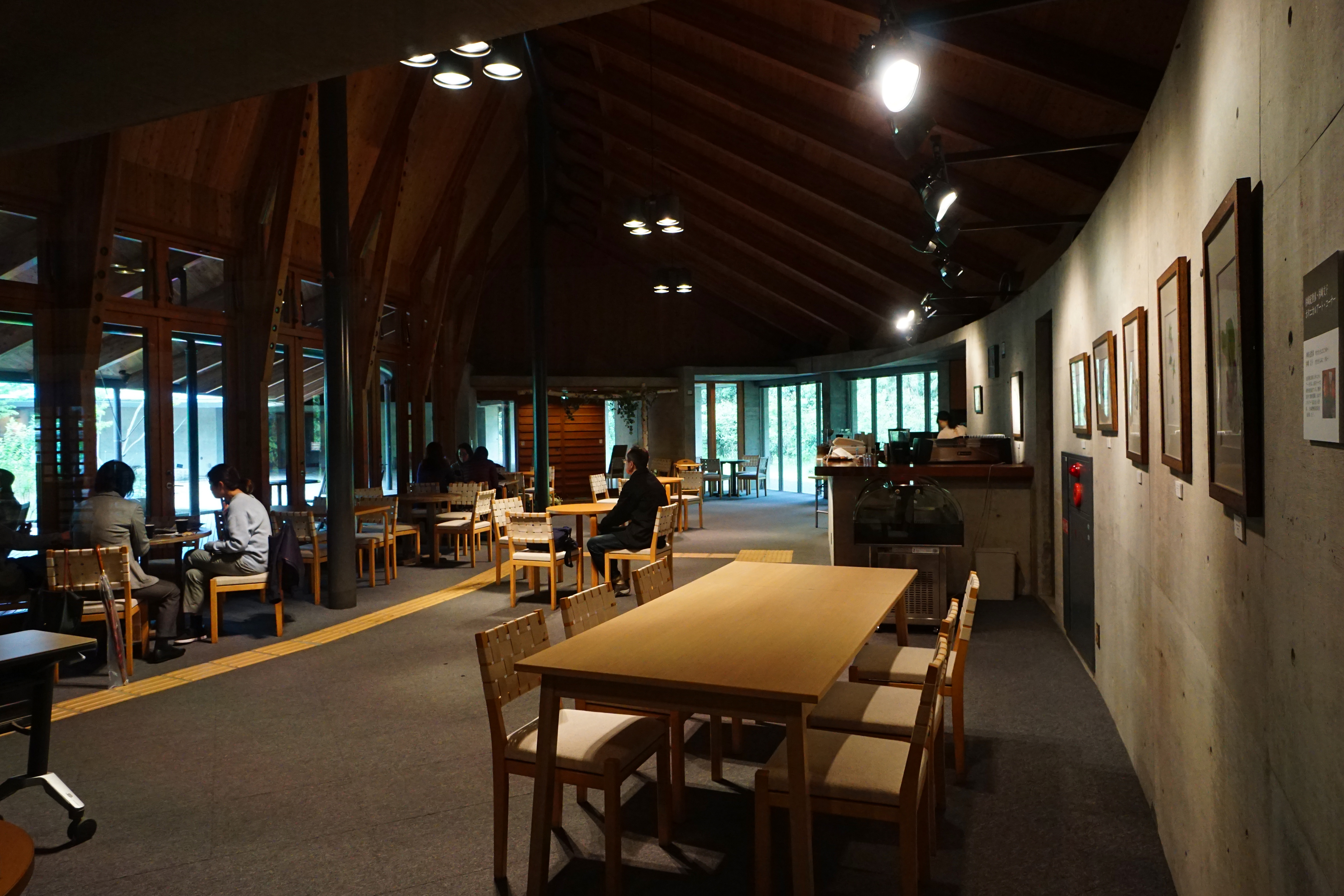
Café

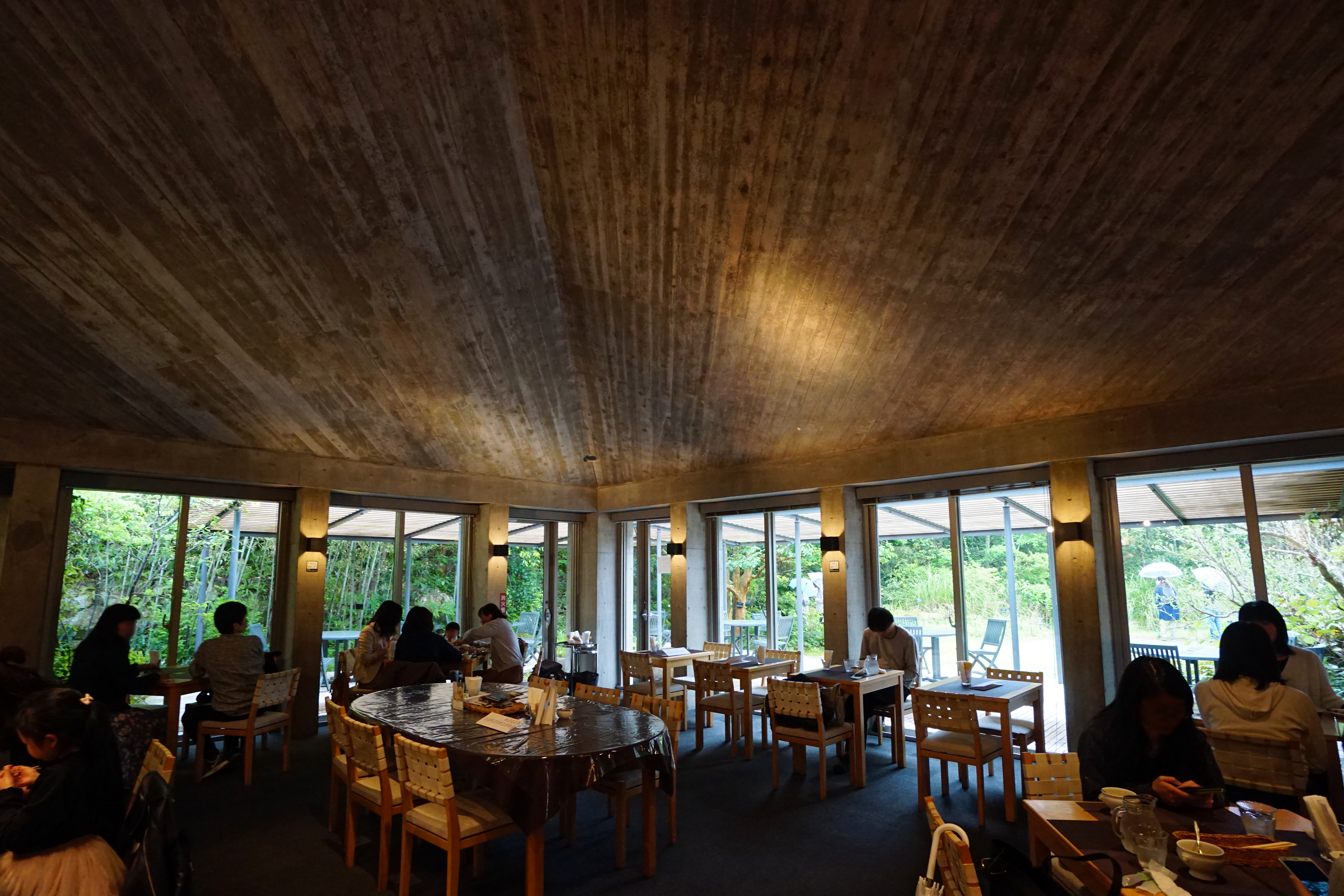
Restaurant

== See also ==
- List of botanical gardens in Japan
- Chikurin-ji

== Sources ==
- Official website (in Japanese)
- BGCI entry
